= Party class =

The sociologist Max Weber formulated a three-component theory of stratification in which he defined party class as a group of people (part of a society) that can be differentiated on the basis of their affiliations with other engaged members in the political domain.

== Characteristics ==
Unlike communities, where problems arise and are solved by those within the group, parties are formed when individuals seek out support beyond their immediate spatial environment. Status groups such as communities, or groups of individuals in similar class situations, become parties only when their means of mobilizing and assembling in pursuit of power becomes structured. A teachers' union is one example of a party drawn from a collective communal body. While the party may not represent the will of each individual member, it forms on the basis of rational collective interests and the assignment of outside individuals to protect those interests. For instance, when taxpayers in a geographic region mobilize to vote against support for allocation of resources to local schools, the teachers' union may enter the political realm to protect the interests of its members. These pursuits are thought to be rational in that they only represent the demands of the members insofar as they relate to the reason for that party's congregation. While all members of the same union may support protection of local wildlife, those interests would be pursued via a separate party.

Unlike power formed on the basis of wealth or status, parties tend to most successfully aggregate and mobilize when their members represent a range of environments and social statuses. While a party's objective may ultimately be the protection of financial capital or the status of its members, parties initially form to represent a range of group interests. A party's political program represents both the key issues that party members decide on once congregated, and pull issues aimed at attracting members who share detached but similar interests. For instance, the nonprofit Habitat for Humanity may use political leverage to obtain funding from the local government, but the homebuilding it provides in low-income neighborhoods draws grassroots support for the organization's efforts. While parties always seek to maintain political leverage, the local environment provides the human capital with which to mobilize those demands.

According to Weber, parties can form in unintended directions and pursue ends that are not initially part of their intended purpose. In The Protestant Ethic and the Spirit of Capitalism, Weber argued that the Protestant religion, initially formed as a spiritual institution, became the ethic that underlay the transition into capitalism. The initial pro-capitalist political parties that formed in Europe reflected the desire to prove success in spiritual life via the accumulation of capital, which became the pinnacle of "worldly calling". As he argued of rationality in general, parties become the formally sanctioned, bureaucratic extension of emotional authority as society transitions into modernity. Parties form primarily in democratic societies because of the ideological differences that can arise between individuals in the same geographic region.

== Issues with party power ==
As more contemporary theorists have noted, parties tend to become overburdened with demands as they grow larger and lose focus on initial key issues. One example, pursued by Doug McAdam in his writing Political Process and the Development of Black Insurgency, was the Civil Rights Movement. Although the movement initially succeeded and made enormous social and political impact due to its rational and centered goals, the movement began to weaken throughout the 1970s due in part to irreconcilable views touted by its various leaders and sects.

== See also ==
- Political party
- Social class
- Status class
