= Fermat–Weber problem =

In mathematics, statistics, and operations research, the Fermat–Weber problem is either of two closely related problems:

- Geometric median, the problem of finding a point minimizing the sum of distances from given points
- Weber problem, the problem of finding a point minimizing the sum of weighted distances from given (point, weight) pairs
