= Thomas Simpson =

British mathematician and inventor

- Simpson, circa 1750
- Born: 20 August 1710; Sutton Cheney, Leicestershire
- Died: 14 May 1761 (aged 50); Market Bosworth, Leicestershire
- Known for: Simpson's rule Simpson–Weber triangle problem

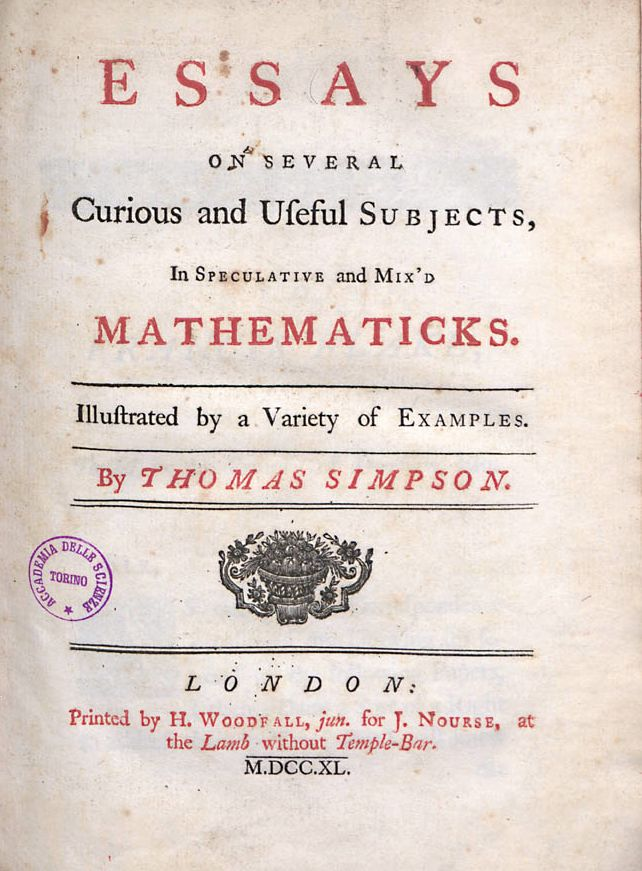
Essays on several curious and useful subjects, in speculative and mix'd mathematicks, 1740

Thomas Simpson FRS (20 August 1710 – 14 May 1761) was a British mathematician and inventor known for the eponymous Simpson's rule to approximate definite integrals. The attribution, as often in mathematics, can be debated: this rule had been found 100 years earlier by Johannes Kepler, and in German it is called Keplersche Fassregel, or roughly "Kepler's Barrel Rule".

== Biography ==
Simpson was born in Sutton Cheney, Leicestershire. The son of a weaver, Simpson taught himself mathematics. At the age of nineteen, he married a fifty-year old widow with two children. As a youth, he became interested in astrology after seeing the 1724 solar eclipse. He also dabbled in divination and caused fits in a girl after 'raising a devil' from her. After this incident, he and his wife fled to Derby. He moved with his wife and children to London at age twenty-five, where he supported his family by weaving during the day and teaching mathematics at night.

From 1743, he taught mathematics at the Royal Military Academy, Woolwich. Simpson was a fellow of the Royal Society. In 1758, Simpson was elected a foreign member of the Royal Swedish Academy of Sciences.

He died in Market Bosworth, and was laid to rest in Sutton Cheney. A plaque inside the church commemorates him.

== Early work ==
Simpson's treatise entitled The Nature and Laws of Chance and The Doctrine of Annuities and Reversions were based on the work of De Moivre and were attempts at making the same material more brief and understandable. Simpson stated this clearly in The Nature and Laws of Chance, referring to Abraham De Moivre's The Doctrine of Chances: "tho' it neither wants Matter nor Elegance to recommend it, yet the Price must, I am sensible, have put it out of the Power of many to purchase it". In both works, Simpson cited De Moivre's work and did not claim originality beyond the presentation of some more accurate data. While he and De Moivre initially got along, De Moivre eventually felt that his income was threatened by Simpson's work and in his second edition of Annuities upon Lives, wrote in the preface:

"After the pains I have taken to perfect this Second Edition, it may happen, that a certain Person, whom I need not name, out of Compassion to the Public, will publish a Second Edition of his Book on the same Subject, which he will afford at a very moderate Price, not regarding whether he mutilates my Propositions, obscures what is clear, makes a Shew of new Rules, and works by mine; in short, confounds, in his usual way, every thing with a croud of useless Symbols; if this be the Case, I must forgive the indigent Author, and his disappointed Bookseller."

== Work ==
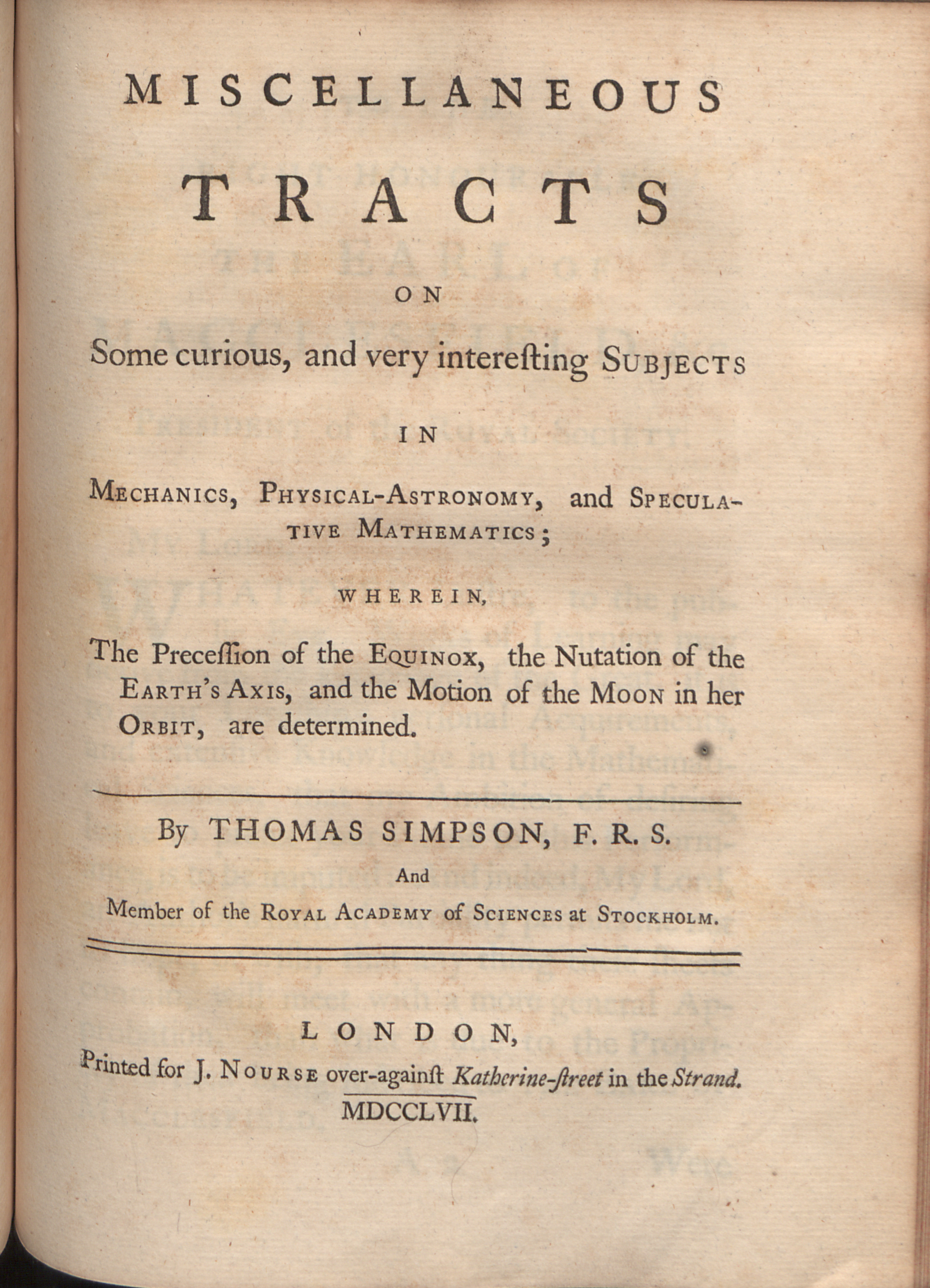
Miscellaneous tracts, 1768

The method commonly called Simpson's Rule was known and used earlier by Bonaventura Cavalieri (a student of Galileo) in 1639, and later by James Gregory; still, the long popularity of Simpson's textbooks invites this association with his name, in that many readers would have learnt it from them.

In the context of disputes surrounding methods advanced by René Descartes, Pierre de Fermat proposed the challenge to find a point D such that the sum of the distances to three given points, A, B and C is least, a challenge popularised in Italy by Marin Mersenne in the early 1640s. Simpson treats the problem in the first part of Doctrine and Application of Fluxions (1750), on pp. 26–28, by the description of circular arcs at which the edges of the triangle ABC subtend an angle of pi/3; in the second part of the book, on pp. 505–506 he extends this geometrical method, in effect, to weighted sums of the distances. Several of Simpson's books contain selections of optimisation problems treated by simple geometrical considerations in similar manner, as (for Simpson) an illuminating counterpart to possible treatment by fluxional (calculus) methods. But Simpson does not treat the problem in the essay on geometrical problems of maxima and minima appended to his textbook on Geometry of 1747, although it does appear in the considerably reworked edition of 1760. Comparative attention might, however, usefully be drawn to a paper in English from eighty years earlier as suggesting that the underlying ideas were already recognised then:

- J. Collins A Solution, Given by Mr. John Collins of a Chorographical Probleme, Proposed by Richard Townley Esq. Who Doubtless Hath Solved the Same Otherwise, Philosophical Transactions of the Royal Society of London, 6 (1671), pp. 2093–2096.

Of further related interest are problems posed in the early 1750s by J. Orchard, in The British Palladium, and by T. Moss, in The Ladies' Diary; or Woman's Almanack (at that period not yet edited by Simpson).

== Simpson-Weber triangle problem ==
This type of generalisation was later popularised by Alfred Weber in 1909. The Simpson-Weber triangle problem consists in locating a point D with respect to three points A, B, and C in such a way that the sum of the transportation costs between D and each of the three other points is minimised. In 1971, Luc-Normand Tellier found the first direct (non iterative) numerical solution of the Fermat and Simpson-Weber triangle problems. Long before Von Thünen's contributions, which go back to 1818, the Fermat point problem can be seen as the very beginning of space economy.

In 1985, Luc-Normand Tellier formulated an all-new problem called the “attraction-repulsion problem”, which constitutes a generalisation of both the Fermat and Simpson-Weber problems. In its simplest version, the attraction-repulsion problem consists in locating a point D with respect to three points A1, A2 and R in such a way that the attractive forces exerted by points A1 and A2, and the repulsive force exerted by point R cancel each other out. In the same book, Tellier solved that problem for the first time in the triangle case, and he reinterpreted the space economy theory, especially, the theory of land rent, in the light of the concepts of attractive and repulsive forces stemming from the attraction-repulsion problem. That problem was later further analysed by mathematicians like Chen, Hansen, Jaumard and Tuy (1992), and Jalal and Krarup (2003). The attraction-repulsion problem is seen by Ottaviano and Thisse (2005) as a prelude to the New Economic Geography that developed in the 1990s, and earned Paul Krugman a Nobel Memorial Prize in Economic Sciences in 2008.

== Publications ==
- Treatise of Fluxions (1737)
- The Nature and Laws of Chance (1740)
- Essays on several curious and useful subjects, in speculative and mix'd mathematicks. London: John Nourse. 1740.
- The Doctrine of Annuities and Reversions (1742)
- Mathematical dissertations on a variety of physical and analytical subjects. London: Thomas Woodward. 1743.
- A Treatise of Algebra (1745)
- Elements of Plane Geometry. To which are added, An Essay on the Maxima and Minima of Geometrical Quantities, And a brief Treatise of regular Solids; Also, the Mensuration of both Superficies and Solids, together with the Construction of a large Variety of Geometrical Problems (Printed for the Author; Samuel Farrer; and John Turner, London, 1747) [The book is described as being Designed for the Use of Schools and the main body of text is Simpson's reworking of the early books of The Elements of Euclid. Simpson is designated Professor of Geometry in the Royal Academy at Woolwich.]
- Trigonometry, Plane and Spherical (1748)
- Doctrine and Application of Fluxions. Containing (besides what is common on the subject) a Number of New Improvements on the Theory. And the Solution of a Variety of New, and very Interesting, Problems in different Branches of the Mathematicks (two parts bound in one volume; J. Nourse, London, 1750)
- Select Exercises in Mathematics (1752)
- Miscellaneous tracts on some curious, and very interesting subjects in mechanics, physical-astronomy, and speculative mathematics. London: John Nourse. 1757.
- Miscellaneous tracts on some curious and very interesting subjects in mechanics, physical-astronomy and speculative mathematics. London: John Nourse. 1768.

== See also ==
- Probability
- Series multisection
- Simpson's rules (ship stability)
