= Intelligentsia =

Status class of university-educated people

"Evening Company" by Vladimir Makovsky (1897). Three generations of Russian intelligentsia discuss current issues.

The intelligentsia is a status class composed of the university-educated people of a society who engage in the complex mental labours by which they critique, shape, and lead in the politics, policies, and culture of their society; as such, the intelligentsia consists of scholars, academics, teachers, journalists, and literary writers.

== Origin of the term ==
Conceptually, the intelligentsia status class arose in the late 18th century, during the Partitions of Poland (1772–1795). Etymologically, the 19th-century Polish intellectual Bronisław Trentowski coined the term inteligencja (intellectuals) to identify and describe the university-educated and professionally active social stratum of the patriotic bourgeoisie; men and women whose intellectualism would provide moral and political leadership to Poland in opposing the cultural hegemony of the Russian Empire.

Before the Russian Revolution, the term intelligentsiya (Russian: интеллигенция) identified and described the status class of university-educated people whose cultural capital (schooling, education, and intellectual enlightenment) allowed them to assume the moral initiative and the practical leadership required in Russian national, regional, and local politics. In practice, the status and social function of the intelligentsia varied by society. In Eastern Europe, the intellectuals were at the periphery of their societies and thus were deprived of political influence and access to the effective levers of political power and of economic development. In Western Europe, the intellectuals were in the mainstream of their societies and thus exercised cultural and political influence that granted access to the power of government office, such as the Bildungsbürgertum, the cultured bourgeoisie of Germany, as well as the professionals of Great Britain.

== Background ==
In a society, the intelligentsia is a status class of intellectuals whose social functions, politics, and national interests are (ostensibly) distinct from the functions of government, commerce, and the military. In Economy and Society: An Outline of Interpretive Sociology (1921), the political economist Max Weber applied the term intelligentsia in chronological and geographical frames of reference, such as "this Christian preoccupation with the formulation of dogmas was, in Antiquity, particularly influenced by the distinctive character of 'intelligentsia', which was the product of Greek education", thus the intelligentsia originated as a social class of educated people created for the greater benefit of society.

In the 19th and 20th centuries, the Polish word and the sociologic concept of the inteligencja became a European usage to describe the social class of men and women who are the intellectuals of the countries of central and of eastern Europe; in Poland, the critical thinkers educated at university, in Russia, the nihilists who opposed traditional values in the name of reason and progress. In the late 20th century, sociologist Pierre Bourdieu said that the intelligentsia has two types of workers: (i) intellectual workers who create knowledge (practical and theoretic) and (ii) intellectual workers who create cultural capital. Sociologically, the Polish inteligencja translates to the intellectuels in France and the Gebildete in Germany.

== History ==
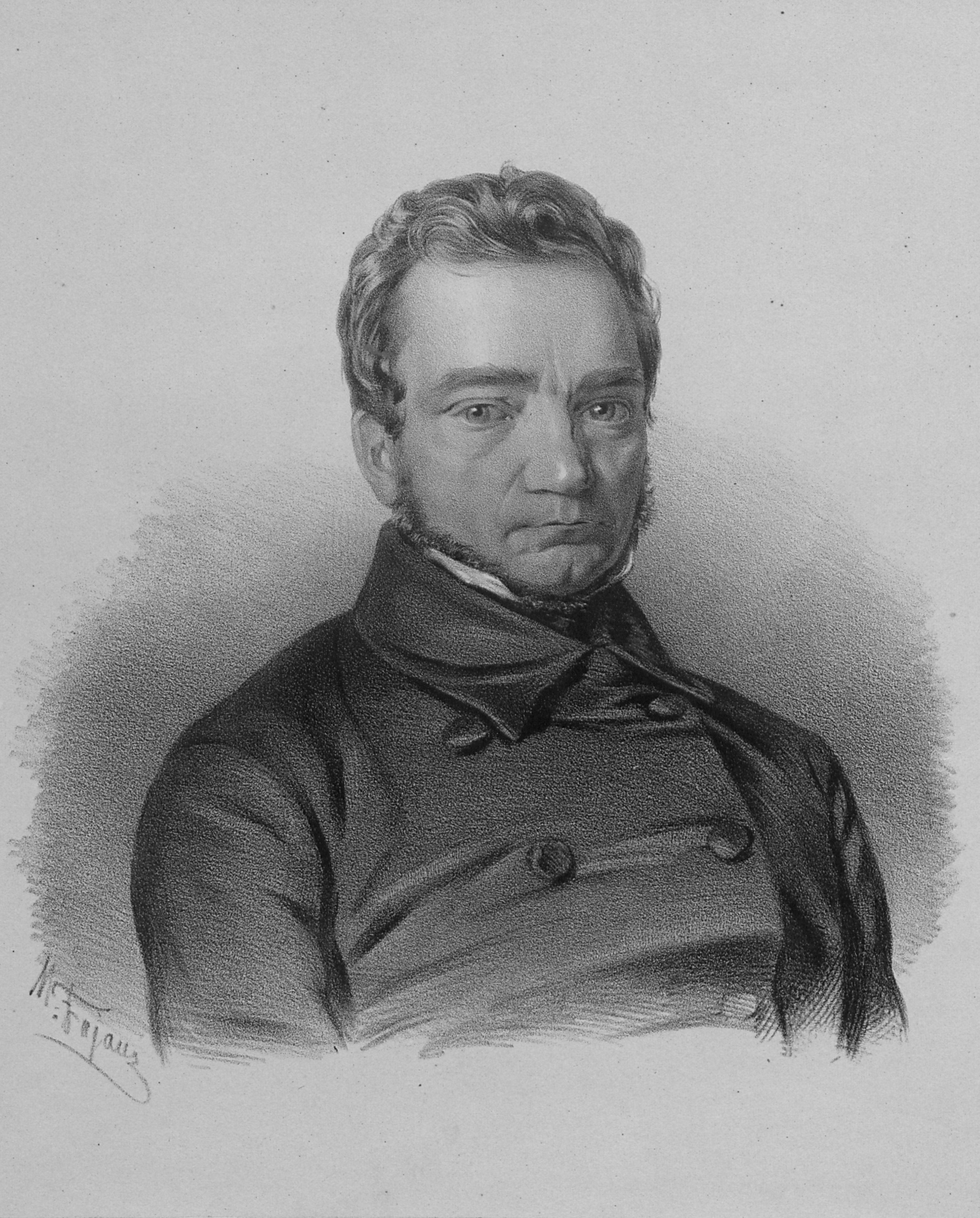
The Polish philosopher Karol Libelt identified the social contradiction inherent in the intelligentsia being politically progressive, whilst also willing to work for the status quo of the State.

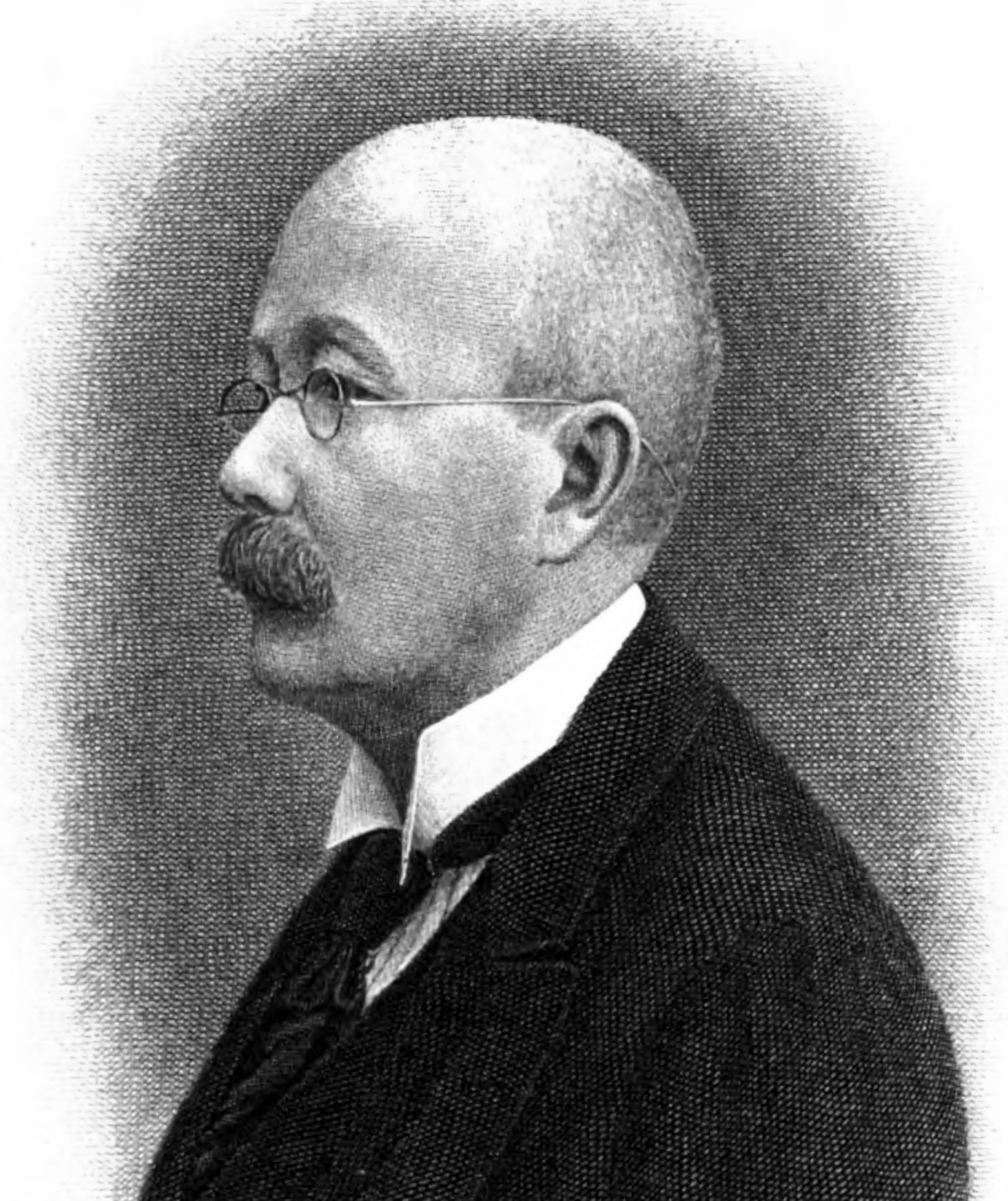
In Russia, the writer Pyotr Boborykin defined the intelligentsia as both the managers of a society, and as the creators of society's high culture.

The intelligentsia existed as a social stratum in European societies before the term inteligencja was coined in 19th-century Poland, to identify the intellectual people whose professions placed them outside the traditional workplaces and labours of the town-and-country social classes (royalty, aristocracy, bourgeoisie) of a monarchy; thus the inteligencja are a social class native to the city. In their functions as a status class, the intellectuals realised the cultural development of cities, the dissemination of printed knowledge (literature, textbooks, newspapers), and the economic development of housing for rent (the tenement) for the teacher, the journalist, and the civil servant.

In On Love of the fatherland (1844), Polish philosopher Karol Libelt uses the term inteligencja—which was the status class composed of scholars, teachers, lawyers, and engineers, et al.—as the educated people of society who provide the moral leadership required to resolve the problems of society, hence the social function of the intelligentsia is to "guide for the reason of their higher enlightenment."

In the 1860s, journalist Pyotr Boborykin popularised the term intelligentsiya (интеллигенция) to identify and describe the Russian social stratum of people educated at university who engage in the intellectual occupations (law, medicine, engineering, the arts) who produce the culture and the dominant ideology by which society functions.

In The Rise of the Intelligentsia, 1750–1831 (2008) Maciej Janowski writes that the Polish intelligentsia were the think tank of the State, intellectual servants whose progressive social and economic policies decreased the social backwardness (illiteracy) of the Polish people, and also decreased Russian political repression in partitioned Poland.

=== Poland ===
==== 19th century ====
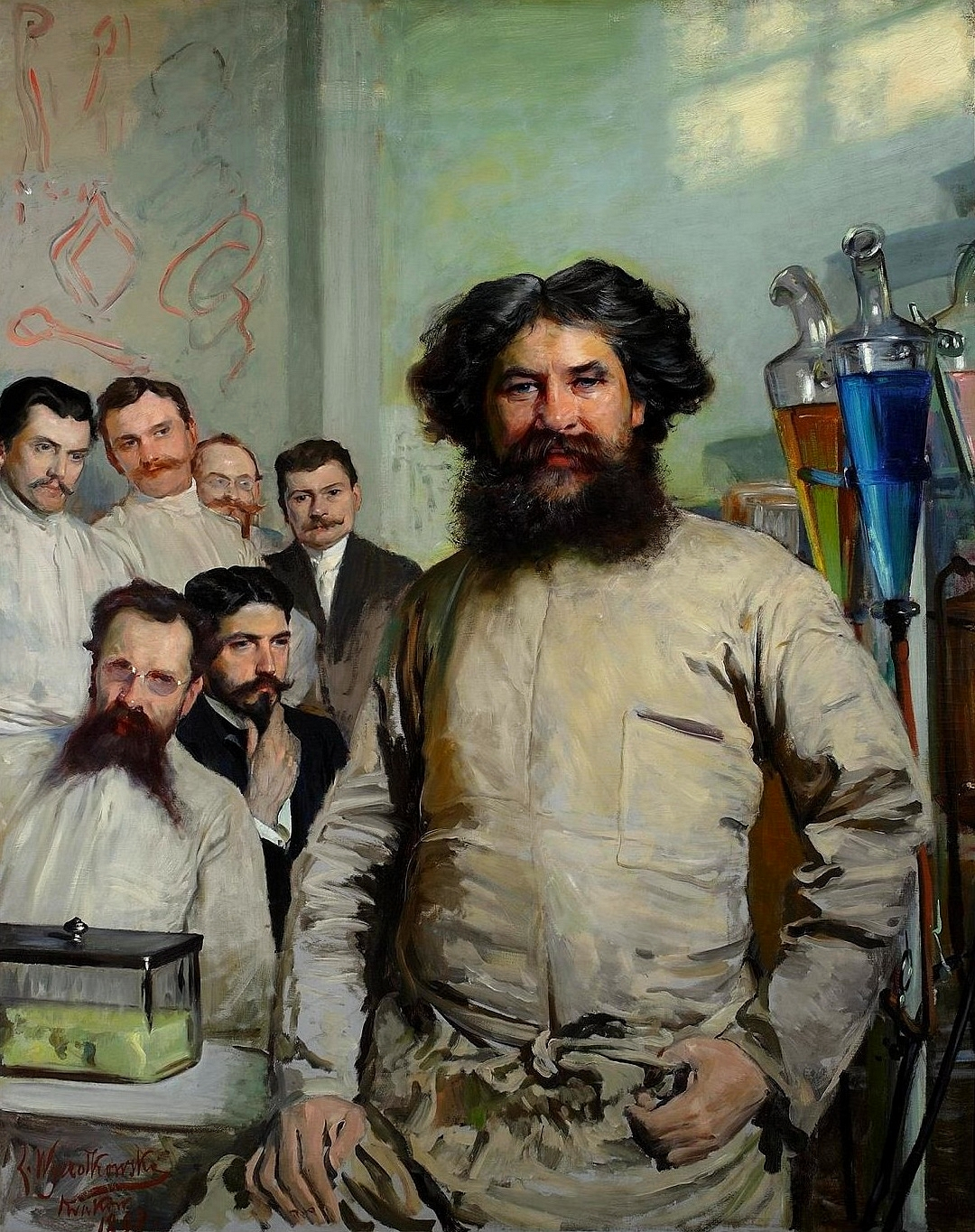
The surgeon Ludwik Rydygier and his assistants. Painting by Leon Wyczółkowski

In 1844 Poland, Libelt described a status class of people characterised by intellect and Polish nationalism; qualities of mind, character, and spirit that made them natural leaders of the modern Polish nation. That the intelligentsia were aware of their social status and of their duties to society: Educating the youth with the nationalist objective to restore the Republic of Poland; preserving the Polish language; and love of the Fatherland.

Nonetheless, writers Stanisław Brzozowski and Tadeusz Boy-Żeleński criticised Libelt's ideological and messianic representation of a Polish republic, because it originated from the social traditionalism and the reactionary conservatism that pervaded Polish culture and impeded socio-economic progress. Consequent to the Imperial Prussian, Austrian, Swedish and Russian partitions of Poland, the imposition of Tsarist cultural hegemony caused many of the political and cultural élites to participate in the Great Emigration (1831–70).

==== Second World War ====
After the invasion of Poland on 1 September 1939, the Nazis launched the extermination of the Polish intelligentsia by way of the military operations of the Special Prosecution Book-Poland, the German AB-Aktion in Poland, the Intelligenzaktion, and the Intelligenzaktion Pommern. In eastern Poland, the Soviet Union proceeded with the extermination of the Polish intelligentsia with operations such as the Katyn massacre (April–May 1940), during which university professors, physicians, lawyers, engineers, teachers, military, policeman, writers and journalists were murdered.

=== Russia ===
==== Imperial era ====
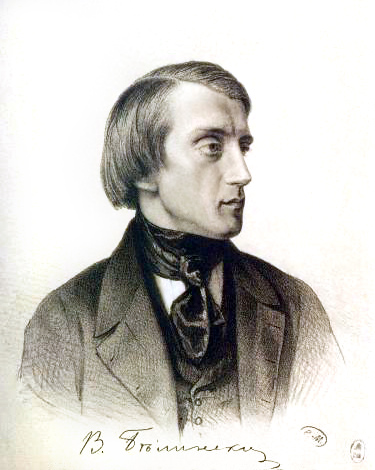
Vissarion Belinsky

The Russian intelligentsiya also was a mixture of messianism and intellectual elitism, which philosopher Isaiah Berlin describes as follows: "The phenomenon, itself, with its historical and literally revolutionary consequences, is, I suppose, the largest, single Russian contribution to social change in the world. The concept of intelligentsia must not be confused with the notion of intellectuals. Its members thought of themselves as united, by something more than mere interest in ideas; they conceived themselves as being a dedicated order, almost a secular priesthood, devoted to the spreading of a specific attitude to life."

The idea of progress, which originated in Western Europe during the Age of Enlightenment in the 18th century, became the principal concern of the intelligentsia by the mid-19th century; thus, progress social movements, such as the Narodniks, mostly consisted of intellectuals. Russian philosopher Sergei Bulgakov said that the Russian intelligentsia was the creation of Peter the Great, that they were the "window to Europe through which the Western air comes to us, vivifying and toxic at the same time." Moreover, Bulgakov also said that the literary critic of Westernization, Vissarion Belinsky was the spiritual father of the Russian intelligentsia.

In 1860, there were 20,000 professionals in Russia and 85,000 by 1900. Originally composed of educated nobles, the intelligentsia became dominated by raznochintsy (classless people) after 1861. In 1833, 78.9 per cent of secondary-school students were children of nobles and bureaucrats, by 1885 they were 49.1 per cent of such students. The proportion of commoners increased from 19.0 to 43.8 per cent, and the remaining percentage were the children of priests. In fear of an educated proletariat, Tsar Nicholas I limited the number of university students to 3,000 per year, yet there were 25,000 students by 1894. Similarly the number of periodicals increased from 15 in 1855 to 140 periodical publications in 1885. The "third element" were professionals hired by zemstva. By 1900, there were 47,000 of them, most were liberal radicals.

Although Tsar Peter the Great introduced the idea of progress to Russia, by the 19th century, the tsars did not recognize "progress" as a legitimate aim of the state, to the degree that Nicholas II said "How repulsive I find that word" and wished it removed from the Russian language.

==== Bolshevik perspective ====
In Russia, the Bolsheviks did not consider the status class of the intelligentsiya to be a true social class, as defined in Marxist philosophy. In that time, the Bolsheviks used the Russian word prosloyka (stratum) to identify and define the intelligentsia as a separating layer without an inherent class character. In the creation of post-monarchic Russia, Lenin was firmly critical of the class character of the intelligentsia, commending the growth of "the intellectual forces of the workers and the peasants" will depose "the bourgeoisie and their accomplices, the educated classes, the lackeys of capital, who consider themselves the brains of the nation." This was followed up by Lenin's famous phrase, "In fact they are not its brain, but its shit" ("На деле это не мозг, а говно").

The Russian Revolution of 1917 divided the intelligentsia and the social classes of tsarist Russia. Some Russians emigrated, the political reactionaries joined the right-wing White movement for counter-revolution, some became Bolsheviks, and some remained in Russia and participated in the political system of the Soviet Union. In reorganizing Russian society, the Bolsheviks deemed non-Bolshevik intelligentsia class enemies and expelled them from society, by way of deportation on Philosophers' steamers, forced labor in the gulag, and summary execution. The members of the tsarist-era intelligentsia who remained in Bolshevik Russia (the USSR) were proletarianized. Although the Bolsheviks recognized the managerial importance of the intelligentsia to the future of Soviet Russia, the bourgeois origin of this stratum gave reason for distrust of their ideological commitment to Marxist philosophy and Bolshevik societal control.

==== Soviet Union ====
In the late Soviet Union the term "intelligentsia" acquired a formal definition of mental and cultural workers. There were subcategories of "scientific-technical intelligentsia" (научно-техническая интеллигенция) and "creative intelligentsia" (творческая интеллигенция). Between 1917 and 1941, there was a massive increase in the number of engineering graduates: from 15,000 to over 250,000.

==== Post-Soviet period ====
In the post-Soviet period, the members of the former Soviet intelligentsia have displayed diverging attitudes towards the communist government. While the older generation of intelligentsia has attempted to frame themselves as victims, the younger generation, who were in their 30s when the Soviet Union collapsed, has not allocated so much space for the repressive experience in their self-narratives. Since the collapse of the Soviet Union, the popularity and influence of the intelligentsia has significantly declined. Therefore, it is typical for the post-Soviet intelligentsia to feel nostalgic for the last years of the Soviet Union (perestroika), which they often regard as the golden age of the intelligentsia.

Vladimir Putin has expressed his view on the social duty of intelligentsia in modern Russia.

We should all be aware of the fact that when revolutionary—not evolutionary—changes come, things can get even worse. The intelligentsia should be aware of this. And it is the intelligentsia specifically that should keep this in mind and prevent society from radical steps and revolutions of all kinds. We've had enough of it. We've seen so many revolutions and wars. We need decades of calm and harmonious development.

== Mass intelligentsia ==
In the 20th century, from the status class term Intelligentsia, sociologists derived the term mass intelligentsia to describe the populations of educated adults with discretionary income, who pursue intellectual interests by way of book clubs and cultural associations, etc. That sociological term was made popular usage by writer Melvyn Bragg, who said that mass intelligentsia conceptually explains the popularity of book clubs and literary festivals that otherwise would have been of limited intellectual interests to most people from the middle class and from the working class.

In the book Campus Power Struggle (1970), sociologist Richard Flacks addresses the concept of mass intelligentsia:

What [Karl] Marx could not anticipate . . . was that the anti-bourgeois intellectuals of his day were the first representatives of what has become, in our time, a mass intelligentsia, a group possessing many of the cultural and political characteristics of a [social] class in Marx's sense. By intelligentsia I mean those [people] engaged vocationally in the production, distribution, interpretation, criticism, and inculcation of cultural values.

== Related concepts ==
The concept of free-floating intelligentsia, coined by Alfred Weber and elaborated by Karl Mannheim, closely relates to the intelligentsia. It refers to an intellectual class that operates independently of social class constraints, allowing for a critical and unbiased perspective. This intellectual autonomy is a defining characteristic of the intelligentsia.

== See also ==
- Anti-intellectualism
- Creative class
- Ilustrado (Philippines)
- Liberal elite
- Obrazovanshchina
- Organic intellectual
- Samuwon (North Korea)
