= Andrew Vázsonyi =

Hungarian mathematician and operations researcher

Andrew Vázsonyi (1916–2003), also known as Endre Weiszfeld and Zepartzatt Gozinto) was a Hungarian mathematician and operations researcher. He is known for Weiszfeld's algorithm for minimizing the sum of distances to a set of points, and for founding The Institute of Management Sciences.

== Biography ==
Endre Weiszfeld was born on November 4, 1916, the middle son of a Jewish family in Budapest, where his father was the owner of a shoe store. At age 14, he met and befriended Paul Erdős (his elder by three years), and at age 16, he began working on the geometric median problem for which he would later publish a solution. He studied at the Pázmány Péter Catholic University in Budapest, from which he earned a doctorate in 1936. His thesis, on higher-dimensional surfaces, was supervised by Lipót Fejér. Because of increasing discrimination against Jews in the 1930s and following the lead of his cousin, politician Vilmos Vázsonyi, he changed his name in 1937 to Andrew Vázsonyi. The name comes from that of his father's native town, Nagyvázsony. During this period, Vázsonyi studied graph theory, working with Erdős on finding necessary and sufficient conditions for an infinite graph to have an Euler tour.

In 1938, Vázsonyi was invited by Otto Szász to escape Europe and work with Szász at the University of Cincinnati, but was only able to obtain a one-year student visa. Instead, he traveled to Paris, and finally succeeded in traveling to the US in April 1940, two months before France's fall to the Nazis. He spent a year at a Quaker workshop at Haverford, Pennsylvania, and in 1941 began graduate studies in mechanical engineering at Harvard University, studying there under Richard von Mises with the support of a Gordon McKay Fellowship. He earned an M.S. in 1942 and continued to work at Harvard for Howard Wilson Emmons, studying the design of supersonic aircraft. While at Harvard, he met and married Baroness Laura Vladimirovna Saparova, a musician and immigrant from Georgia whom he had met at Harvard's International Club.

In 1945, Vázsonyi took US citizenship and left Harvard, working as an engineer for the Elliott Company in Jeannette, Pennsylvania. From there, he moved to southern California, where he worked on missile design for North American Aviation. He moved to the U.S. Naval Ordnance Test Station in 1948, where he headed their missile guidance and control division, and in 1953 moved again to Hughes Aircraft. At Hughes, his interests shifted from aeronautics to management science. He began working on computerization of Hughes' payroll and production lines, and on diagramming parts requirements. His alias "Zepartzatt Gozinto" began during this period, when he visited the RAND Corporation and, during a presentation there, made a joke that was misinterpreted by attendee George Dantzig. Through the 1950s and 1960s, Vázsonyi continued to work on management science problems at several other companies, including the Ramo-Wooldridge Corporation, Roe Alderson, and a second stint at NAA.

In 1970, Vázsonyi joined the School of Management at the University of Southern California, but he did not get tenure there, and in 1973 he moved to the Graduate School of Business at the University of Rochester. In the late 1970s, threatened with forced retirement at Rochester as he neared age 65, he moved again to St. Mary's University, Texas. He retired in 1987, but continued to teach as an emeritus professor at the University of San Francisco.

Vázsonyi died on November 13, 2003, in Santa Rosa, California. In 2009, a memorial collection of research articles was published in his honor.

== Contributions ==
=== Weiszfeld's algorithm ===
The geometric median of a set of points in the Euclidean plane is the point (not necessarily in the given set) that minimizes the sum of distances to the given points; the solution for three points was first given by Evangelista Torricelli, after being challenged with it by Pierre de Fermat in the 17th century. An algorithm for the more general problem with an arbitrarily large number of points, published by Weiszfeld in 1937, solves this problem numerically using a hill climbing procedure that repeatedly finds a point improving the sum of distances until no more improvements can be made. Each step of this algorithm assigns weights to the points, inversely proportional to the distances to the current solution, and then finds the weighted average of the points, which is the point that minimizes the sum of the squares of the weighted distances. The algorithm has been frequently rediscovered, and although other methods for finding the geometric median are known, Weiszfeld's algorithm is still frequently used due to its simplicity and rapid convergence.

=== Kruskal's tree theorem ===
Kruskal's tree theorem states that, in every infinite set of finite trees, there exists a pair of trees one of which is homeomorphically embedded into the other; another way of stating the same fact is that the homeomorphisms of trees form a well-quasi-ordering. In his 1960 paper giving the first proof of this result, Joseph Kruskal credits it to a conjecture of Vázsonyi. The Robertson–Seymour theorem greatly generalizes this result from trees to graphs.

=== TIMS and DSI ===
While working in the aerospace industry, Vázsonyi attended meetings of the Operations Research Society of America, but found it to be too remote from the business interests of his employers. In 1953, with William W. Cooper and Mel Salveson, Vázsonyi founded The Institute of Management Sciences; Cooper became the first president of the new society, and Vázsonyi became the first past president (without ever having been president). ORSA and TIMS later merged in 1995 to form the Institute for Operations Research and the Management Sciences.

Vázsonyi also helped found the Decision Sciences Institute, and became a fellow of it.

=== Books ===
As well as his 2002 autobiography, Which Door Has the Cadillac: Adventures of a Real-Life Mathematician, Vázsonyi was the author of several technical books, including:

- Scientific programming in business and industry (Wiley, 1963)
- Problem solving by digital computers with PL/I programming (Prentice-Hall, 1970)
- Finite mathematics: quantitative analysis for management (Wiley, 1977)
- Introduction to data processing (R. D. Irwin, 1980)

== External resources ==
- Biography of Andrew Vazsonyi from the Institute for Operations Research and the Management Sciences
