= Graph center =

Set of all vertices of minimum eccentricity

A graph with central points colored red. These are the three vertices A such that d(A, B) ≤ 3 for all vertices B. Each black vertex is a distance of at least 4 from some other vertex.

The center (or Jordan center) of a graph is the set of all vertices of minimum eccentricity, that is, the set of all vertices u where the greatest distance d(u,v) to other vertices v is minimal. Equivalently, it is the set of vertices with eccentricity equal to the graph's radius. Thus vertices in the center (central points) minimize the maximal distance from other points in the graph.

This is also known as the vertex 1-center problem and can be extended to the vertex k-center problem.

Finding the center of a graph is useful in facility location problems where the goal is to minimize the worst-case distance to the facility. For example, placing a hospital at a central point reduces the longest distance the ambulance has to travel.

The center can be found using the Floyd–Warshall algorithm. Another algorithm has been proposed based on matrix calculus.

The concept of the center of a graph is related to the closeness centrality measure in social network analysis, which is the reciprocal of the mean of the distances d(A,B).
