= Luc-Normand Tellier =

Canadian professor

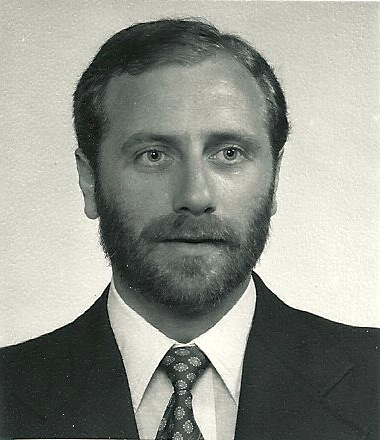
- Born: 10 October 1944 (age 82); Montreal, Quebec, Canada

Academic background
- Education: Université de Montréal, University of Pennsylvania

Academic work
- Discipline: Regional science, economics
- Institutions: Université du Québec à Montréal

Luc-Normand Tellier (French pronunciation: [lyk nɔʁmɑ̃ tɛlje]; born October 10, 1944) is a Professor Emeritus in spatial economics of the University of Quebec at Montreal.

== Education and teaching ==
After teaching for two years (1964–1966) at the Collège Saint-André of Kigali, Rwanda, as a Canadian Peace Corps (CUSO/SUCO) volunteer, Tellier studied both economics and city planning. He obtained a bachelor's degree in Economics (1968) and a master's degree in City planning (1971) from the University of Montreal, as well as a master's degree (1971) and a Ph.D. (1973) in Regional science from the "Ivy League" University of Pennsylvania. Later, he taught urban economics at the "Institut d’urbanisme" of the University of Montreal before founding, in 1976, the Department of Urban Studies and Tourism of the University of Quebec at Montreal. He was chairman of that department for 13 years as well as, from 1981 to 1983, the director of the "Urbanisation" research center of the Institut National de la Recherche Scientifique (INRS). He was granted the title of "Professor Emeritus" of the University of Quebec at Montréal in 2012.

== The Fermat and Weber triangles ==
In 1971, he found the first analytical (direct non iterative) numerical solution of the Fermat and Weber triangle problems. Identified long before Von Thünen’s contributions, which go back to 1818, the Fermat triangle problem can be seen as the very beginning of space economy. It was formulated by the famous French mathematician Pierre de Fermat before 1640. More than 330 years later, it still had no analytical numerical solution. As for the Weber triangle problem, which is a generalization of the Fermat triangle problem, it was first formulated by Thomas Simpson in 1750, and popularized by Alfred Weber in 1909. In 1971, that problem still had no analytical numerical solution. The Fermat triangle problem consists in locating a point D with respect to three points A, B, and C in such a way that the sum of the distances between D and each of the three other points is minimized. The Weber triangle problem consists in locating a point D with respect to three points A, B, and C in such a way that the sum of the transportation costs between D and each of the three other points is minimized.

In 1985, in a book entitled Économie spatiale: rationalité économique de l'espace habité, Tellier formulated an all-new problem called the "attraction-repulsion problem", which constitutes a generalization of both the Fermat and Weber problems. In the same book, he solved that problem for the first time in the triangle case, and he reinterpreted the space economy theory, especially, the theory of land rent, in the light of the concepts of attractive and repulsive forces stemming from the attraction-repulsion problem. That problem was later further analyzed by mathematicians like Chen, Hansen, Jaumard and Tuy (1992), and Jalal and Krarup (2003). Moreover, the attraction-repulsion problem is seen by Ottaviano and Thisse (2005) as a prelude to the New Economic Geography that developed in the 1990s, and earned Paul Krugman a Nobel Memorial Prize in Economic Sciences in 2008. In its simplest version, the attraction-repulsion problem consists in locating a point D with respect to three points A_{1}, A_{2} and R in such a way that the attractive forces exerted by points A_{1} and A_{2}, and the repulsive force exerted by point R cancel each other out.

== The topodynamic model and theory ==
In 1989, Tellier resorted to the attraction-repulsion problem to elaborate a new type of demo-economic model, the topodynamic model, which is not econometric, and which was developed before the emergence of the New Economic Geography. The topodynamic model was conceived with respect to a continuous space, and it allows generating long-run demo-economic projections in regions where other demo-economic models cannot generate believable projections due to the lack of reliable data.

In 1995, Tellier wrote a paper with Claude Vertefeuille introducing the concept of topodynamic inertia, and laying a mathematical basis for that concept. That paper launched a debate that led to refining the concept, and greatly consolidating its mathematical basis. This was done in cooperation with Martin Pinsonnault. In 1997, Tellier published another paper that introduced the concept of topodynamic corridors, and the idea of a new section of economic sciences intended to complete microeconomics, meso-economics and macroeconomics. That new section, called "anoeconomics", would study the space-economic phenomena that are observed at a larger scale than that of the States (which is the scale of macroeconomics) in a very long-run perspective. "Anoeconomics" comes from ano in Ancient Greek, which means "going back through time, and going up through space" (as in the word "anode").

In 2005 (in French) and 2009 (in English), Tellier published a book that reinterpreted the urban world history in the light of the topodynamic theory he had previously developed.

In 2017-2018, he elaborated and implemented an Urban Metric System based on the notions of attractive force, repulsive force, and vector field analysis. That method allows to mathematically delimit the boundaries of urban areas (central cities, agglomerations, metropolitan areas, megacities, megalopolises, etc.) on the unique basis of the spatial distribution of dwellers and workers.

== Arctic rapprochement ==
In his first book, whose title was "Le Québec, État nordique", Tellier proposed a rapprochement between Canada, Denmark, Finland, Iceland, Norway, Sweden, and, eventually, an independent Quebec. That was 19 years before the Ottawa Declaration of 1996, and the creation of the Arctic Council, which gathers together those countries, plus Russia and the United States.

== Historical research ==
Parallel to his work in spatial economics, Tellier published in 1987 a book about the Le Tellier clan, which was one of the two main clans that struggled for obtaining the favors of the king of France at Versailles during the 17th and 18th centuries. It is in this clan that economic liberalism was born in reaction to "colbertism", which was the economic philosophy of the opposite clan.

== Main contributions ==
- Tellier, Luc-Normand, 1972, "The Weber Problem: Solution and Interpretation", Geographical Analysis, Vol. 4, No. 3, pp. 215–33.
- Tellier, Luc-Normand, 1977, Le Québec, État nordique, Montréal, Éditions Quinze, 232 pages, ISBN 0885651316.
- Tellier, Luc-Normand, 1985, Économie spatiale: rationalité économique de l'espace habité, Chicoutimi, Gaëtan Morin éditeur, 280 pages, ISBN 2891051610.
- Tellier, Luc-Normand, 1987, Face aux Colbert: les Le Tellier, Vauban, Turgot et l'avènement du libéralisme, Québec, Presses de l'Université du Québec, 816 pages, ISBN 2760504611.
- Tellier, Luc-Normand and Boris Polanski, 1989, "The Weber Problem: Frequency of Different Solution Types and Extension to Repulsive Forces and Dynamic Processes", Journal of Regional Science, Vol 29, No. 3, pp. 387–405.
- Tellier, Luc-Normand, 1992, "From the Weber Problem to a "Topodynamic" Approach to Locational Systems", Environment and Planning A, Vol. 24, pp. 793–806.
- Tellier, Luc-Normand, 1993, Économie spatiale: rationalité économique de l'espace habité (seconde édition revue, augmentée et corrigée), Montréal, Éditions Gaëtan Morin, 285 pages, ISBN 2891055012.
- Tellier, Luc-Normand and Claude Vertefeuille, 1995, "Understanding Spatial Inertia: Centre of Gravity, Population Densities, the Weber Problem and Gravity Potential", Journal of Regional Science, Vol. 35, No 1, February 1995, pp. 155–64.
- Tellier, Luc-Normand, 1997, "A Challenge for Regional Science: Revealing and Explaining the Global Spatial Logic of Economic Development", Papers in Regional Science, Vol. 76, No 4, pp. 371–84.
- Tellier, Luc-Normand, and Martin Pinsonnault, 1998, "Further Understanding Spatial Inertia : a Reply", Journal of Regional Science, Vol. 38, No 3, pp. 513–34.
- Tellier, Luc-Normand, 2005, Redécouvrir l’histoire mondiale, sa dynamique économique, ses villes et sa géographie, Montréal, Éditions Liber, 592 pages, ISBN 2895780633.
- Tellier, Luc-Normand, 2009, Urban World History : An Economic and Geographical Perspective, Presses de l’Université du Québec, 620 pages, ISBN 9782760515888.
- Tellier, Luc-Normand, 2017, Émergence de Montréal dans le système urbain nord-américain: 1642-1776, Québec, Septentrion, 528 p. ISBN 9782894488881
- Tellier, Luc-Normand, and Jérémy Gelb, 2018, "An Urban Metric System based on space-economy : Foundations, and implementation", Regional Science Policy and Practice, 2018 :1-16. https://doi.org/10.1111/rsp3.12141
- Tellier, Luc-Normand, 2019, Urban World History : An Economic and Geographical Perspective, Second Edition, Springer Nature, 465 pages, ISBN 978-3-030-24841-3.
- Tellier, Luc-Normand, 2020, "Characterizing urban form by means of the Urban Metric System", Land Use Policy, ISSN: 0264-8377, on line May 12, 2020, on paper November 2021, article 104672.
- Tellier, Luc-Normand, and Guillaume Marois, 2021, "The 'Invasion Peril' in light of the topodynamic theory, and some recent statistics", in Karima Kourtit, Bruce Newbold, Peter Nijkamp, and Mark Partridge (ed.), The Economic Geography of Cross-Border Migration, Basle, Switzerland : Springer Nature, pp. 15–32.
- Tellier, Luc-Normand, 2021, « Integrating Entropy in the Topodynamic Approach and the Urban Metric System », in Aura Reggiani, Laurie Schintler, Roberto Patuelli & Danny Czamanski (dir.), Entropy, Complexity and Spatial Dynamics, Royaume-Uni, Cheltenham Glos, Edward Elgar, Chapter 12, pp. 198–215.
- Tellier, Luc-Normand, 2024, Rwanda de ma jeunesse: en hommage au travail du Père Léon Delmas, Kigali, Rwanda, Izuba éditions, 386 pages, ISBN 979-10-93440-50-7.
- Tellier, Luc-Normand, Quesnel, Frédéric, and Justin Bur, 2024, "Estimating urban sprawl standards by means of the Urban Metric System”, Regional Science Policy and Practice, Vol. 16, Issue 11, November 2024, Article 100131.
