= Max Weber Sr. =

German lawyer and politician (1836–1897)

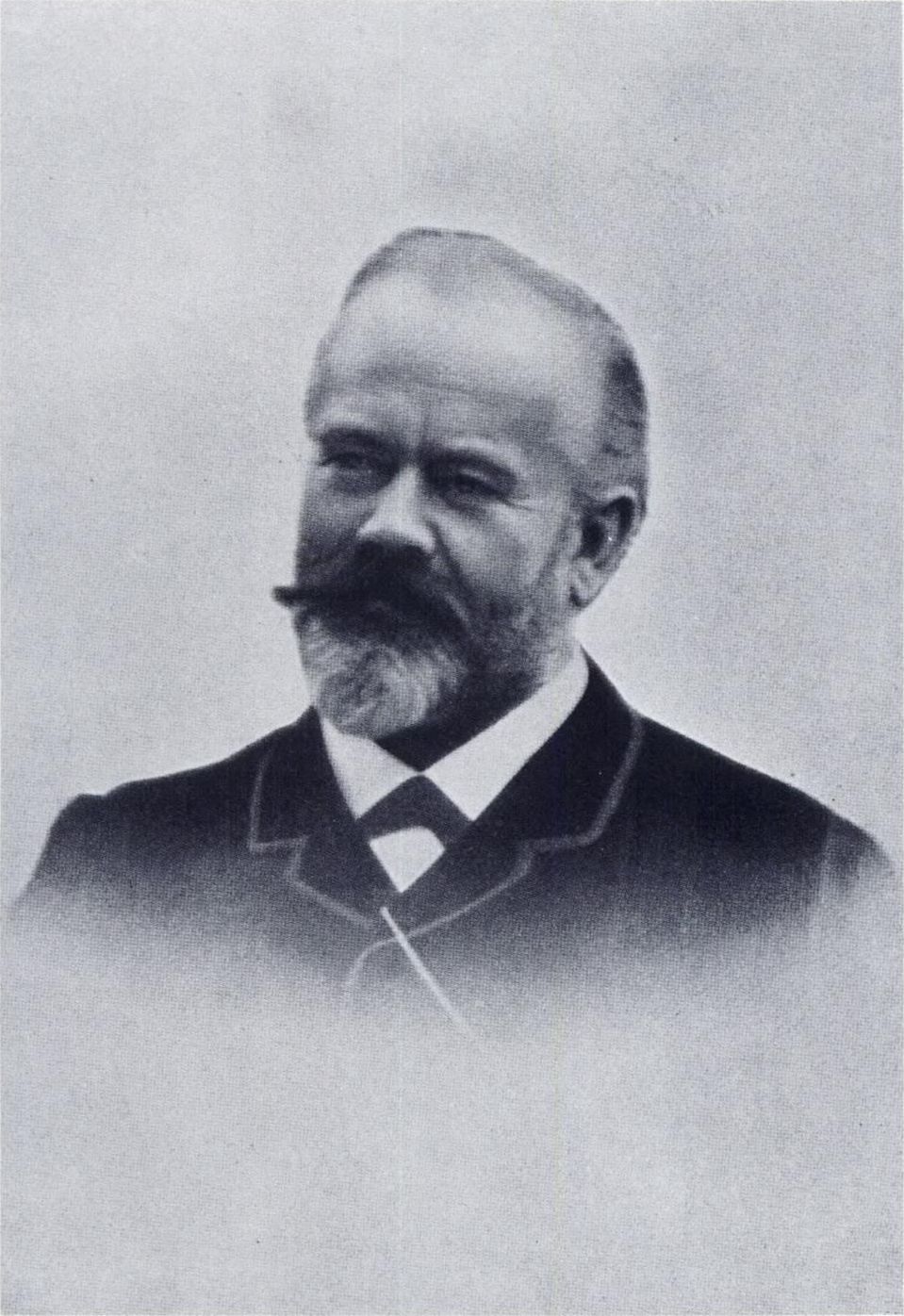
Max Weber Sr. in 1888

Wilhelm Maximilian Weber^{[a]} (May 31, 1836 – August 10, 1897) was a German lawyer, municipal official and National Liberal politician. He was the father of the social scientists Max and Alfred Weber.

== Biography ==
Wilhelm Maximilian Weber was born in Bielefeld, on May 31, 1836. He came from a family of Westphalian origin, with a background as merchants and industrialists in the textile business. He was a brother of the entrepreneur Carl David Weber. He studied at Göttingen, where he became member of Burschenschaft Hannovera (fraternity), and Berlin and received a doctorate, becoming a Doctor of Law. Between 1862 and 1869, he was a magistrate for the Erfurt municipal council, having previously held this position in Berlin. He began working in Berlin in 1893 and finally, in Charlottenburg, which was not yet a part of Berlin.

He was a leading member of the National Liberal Party and was a member of the central executive committee. He was a member of the Berlin City Council. Between 1872 and 1877 and again from 1879 to 1884, Weber was a member of the German Empire Reichstag. He was also a member of the Prussian House of Representatives (German: Preußisches Abgeordnetenhaus) from 1868 to 1882 and from 1884 to 1897, the Reich Debt Administration (German: Reichsschuldenverwaltung), and the Prussian Debt Commission (German: preußischen Schuldenkommission). Politically, he was a "constitutionalist" (a supporter of the monarchy and the constitution) and a follower of Rudolf von Bennigsen.

He wrote several journal articles on politics and statistics. Throughout his life, he avoided acting in a way that would make him seem radical, or not part of the establishment.

He died on August 10, 1897, in Riga while traveling with his friend. The cause of his death has been uncertain, possibly a bleeding ulcer. He was buried in Berlin (Kirchhof Jerusalem und Neue Kirche IV cemetery).

== Personal life ==
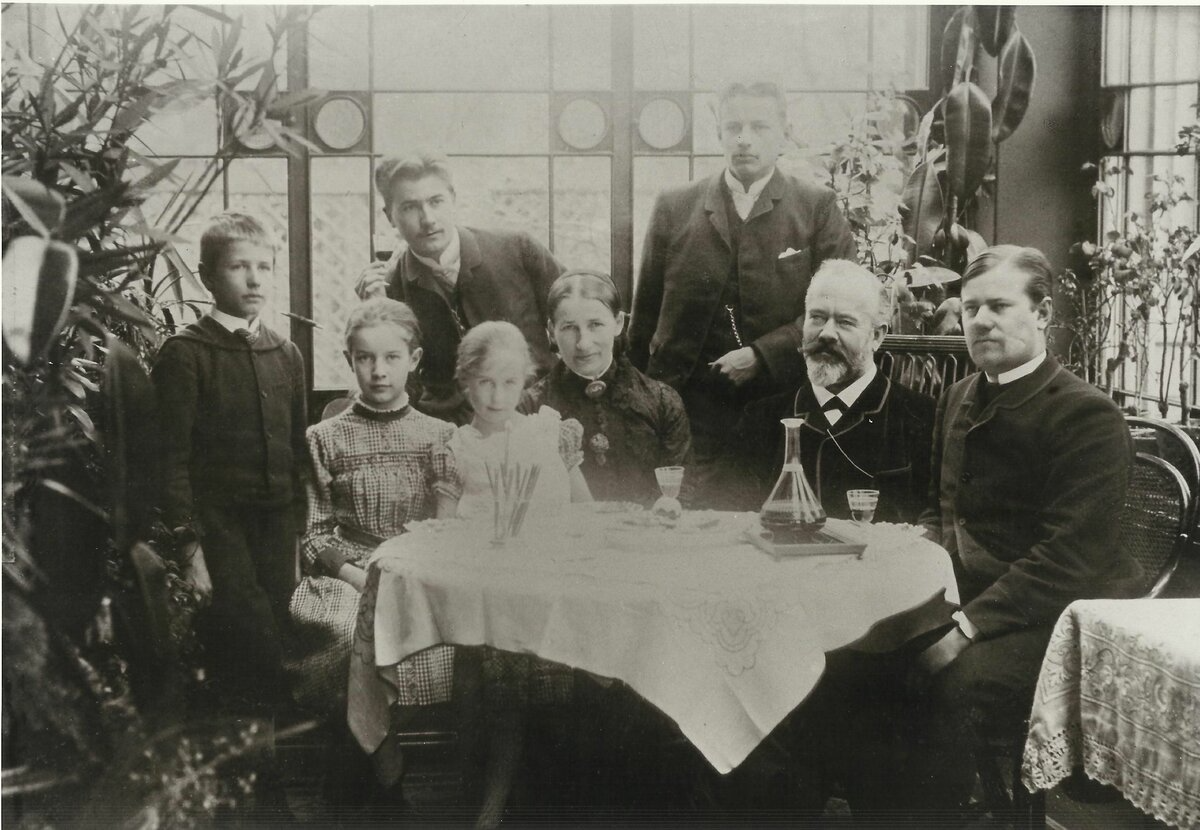
Max Weber Sr. with his wife and children

In 1863, he married Helene Fallenstein, (1844–1919), the daughter of the poet George Friedrich Fallenstein (1790–1853). They had eight children, six of whom reached adulthood, including the sociologist Max (Jr.) and the economist Alfred Weber. His daughter, Clara (1875–1953), married one of Theodor Mommsen's sons.

His house was often visited by prominent politicians, such as Rudolf von Bennigsen and immediate subordinates of Otto von Bismarck. He was also visited by intellectuals, like professors Heinrich von Treitschke, Heinrich von Sybel, and Theodor Mommsen. His wife was an intellectual herself and an active participant in the discussions.

Unlike his ascetic wife, Weber "enjoyed earthly pleasures". This created marital tension in the family and was one of the reasons he grew estranged from his son, Max Weber, Jr. The conflicting influences of his parents were often cited as important influences on the younger Max. Two months before his death, he had a serious unresolved quarrel regarding his treatment of his wife with the younger Max. Shortly after his funeral, his son suffered a severe and long depression as a result.

== Notes ==
- a Sources generally refer to Max Weber as Max Weber Sr. or senior. This likely serves to differentiate between him and his son, Max Weber. In those contexts, the younger Max is sometimes referred to as Max Weber, Jr.
