= Free-floating intellectuals =

Ability to think independently

Free-floating intellectuals or free-floating intelligentsia (German: Freischwebende Intelligenz) is a term from the sociology of knowledge that was used by the sociologist and philosopher Karl Mannheim in 1929, but was originally coined by the sociologist Alfred Weber. It includes the members of the intelligentsia, whose relative independence as a socially undefined class allows them to break away from the normative thinking of their environment and to act independently of social class conditions. The intellectual floats (relatively) freely above things and tasks and is therefore less tied to ideology than other people. Karl Mannheim applied this to the political as well as the economic and cultural areas. According to Mannheim, the socially free-floating intellectuals is unbound, critical and sensitive. It is able to represent pluralistic views and have a positive impact on social conditions.

Mannheim sought a way out of the dilemma that the human mind moves within social bonds and biases in contemplation, reasoning and knowledge, but on the other hand wants to and, in his opinion, can find unadulterated truths.

== Reception ==
According to Magnus Klaue, Mannheim called free-floating intellectuals the “milieu that shaped the Weimar Republic, which emerged as a result of the crisis of the educated middle class and in which (even then often unemployed) academics, private scholars, wealthy but professionally unambitious middle-class sons and lumpen intellectuals came together.” He has want to point out both the possibilities of this milieu for social and intellectual independence and the danger that it sees itself as an intellectual avant-garde, rejects bourgeois normality as bourgeois and wants to impose its own moral views on the “backward” majority.

== See also ==
- Sociology of knowledge
