= Status group =

Categorization of people within a society

The German sociologist Max Weber formulated a three-component theory of stratification that defines a status group (also status class and status estate) as a group of people within a society who can be differentiated by non-economic qualities such as honour, prestige, ethnicity, race, and religion. The German terms are Stand (status group) and Stände (status groups)

To date, sociologists study the matter of "status incongruence" in both in post-industrial societies, and in pre-industrial societies. Status groups emerge from "the house of honor", and that such status-honor stands in contrast with:

- social class, based on economically determined relationship in the house of the marketplace
- political party, based on affiliations in the political domain, or the house of power

Status groups, social classes, and political parties are the constituent concepts of the three-component theory of stratification. Discussion of the relationships among status groups, social class, and political parties occurs in Weber's essay "Class, Status, Party", written before the First World War (1914–18); the first translation into English, by Hans Gerth and C. Wright Mills, was published in the 1940s. Dagmar Waters and colleagues produced a newer English translation of the essay, titled "The Distribution of Power within the Community: Classes, Stände, Parties" (2010), published in the "Journal of Classical Sociology"; the title of the new English-language translation includes the German word "Stände" (status groups) in place of the English term.

Status groups feature in the varieties of social stratification addressed in popular literature and in the academic literature, such as categorization of people by race, ethnic group, racial caste, professional groups, community groups, nationalities, etc. These contrast with relationships rooted in economic relations, which Weber calls "class".

Sociologist Pierre Bourdieu discusses cultural capital and symbolic capital. Like Weber, he comments on how non-monetary means are used to confer and deny status to individuals and groups.

== See also ==
- Caste
- Charismatic authority
- Cultural capital
- Intelligentsia
- Kinship
- Social stratification
- Symbolic capital
