= Alfred Weber =

German geographer and economist (1868–1958)

- Alfred Weber in 1910
- Born: Carl David Alfred Weber; 30 July 1868; Erfurt, Province of Saxony, Kingdom of Prussia
- Died: 2 May 1958 (aged 89); Heidelberg, Baden-Württemberg, West Germany
- Known for: Weber problem
- Partners: Else von Richthofen
- Father: Max Weber Sr.
- Relatives: Max Weber (brother)
- Scientific career
- Doctoral advisor: Gustav von Schmoller
- Notable students: Carl Joachim Friedrich

Carl David Alfred Weber (German: [ˈveːbɐ]; 30 July 1868 – 2 May 1958) was a German economist, geographer, sociologist, philosopher, and cultural theorist whose work was influential in the development of modern economic geography.

His other work focused on the sociology of knowledge and the role of intellectuals in society. In particular, he introduced the concept of free-floating intelligentsia (Freischwebende Intelligenz).

He was the brother of the influential sociologist Max Weber.

== Life ==
Alfred Weber, was born in Erfurt, Province of Saxony, Kingdom of Prussia, on 30 July 1868 to Max Weber Sr. and Helene Fallenstein. He was the third of their eight children and was the younger brother of the sociologist Max Weber. His family moved to Charlottenburg in 1869. From 1907 to 1933, he was a professor at Heidelberg University. Weber started his career as a lawyer and worked as a sociologist and cultural philosopher.

== Work ==
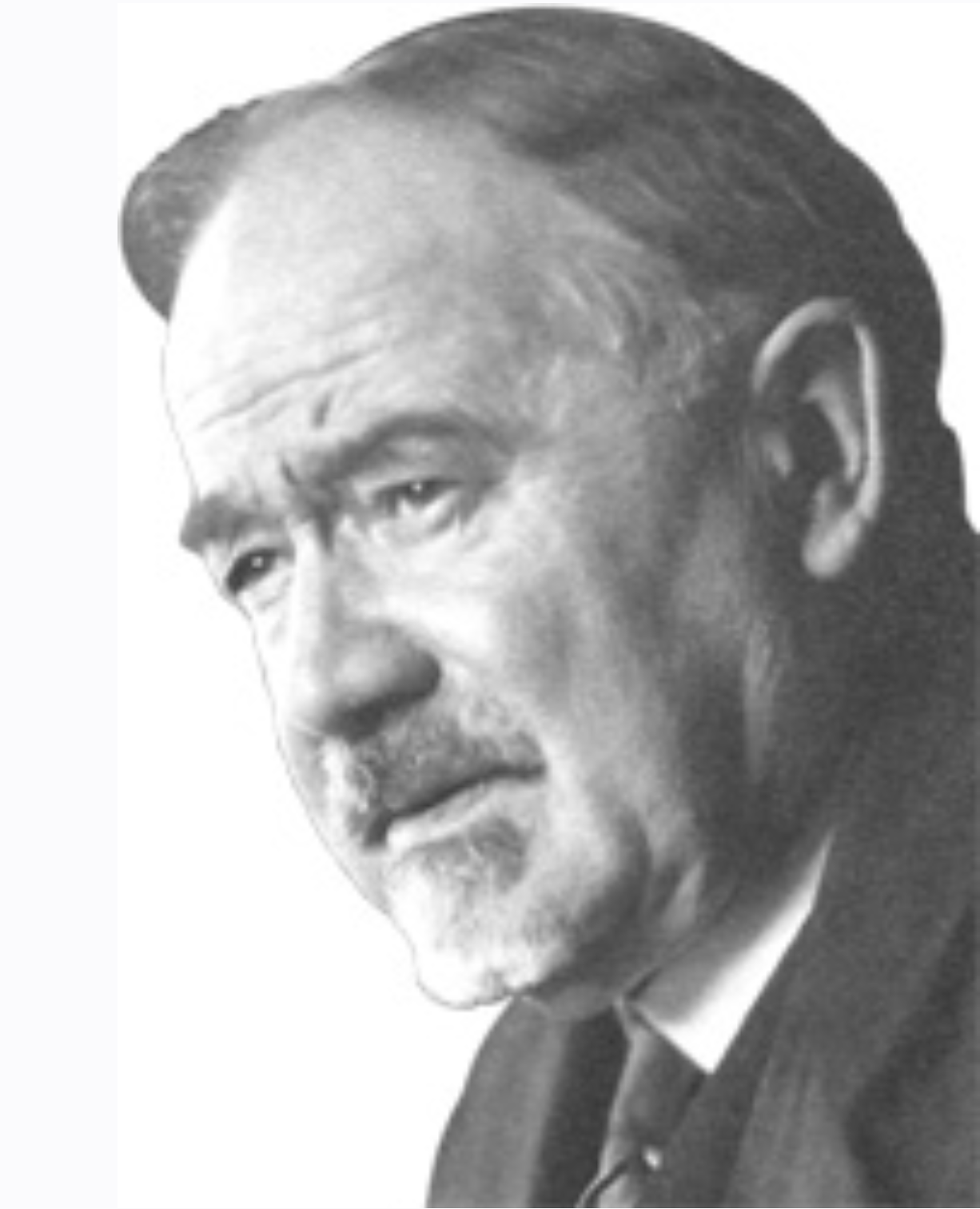
Alfred Weber in old age

Weber supported reintroducing theory and causal models to the field of economics, in addition to using historical analysis. In this field, his achievements involve work on early models of industrial location. He lived during the period when sociology became a separate field of science.

Though his theory on 'Industrial Location' was strictly economic during his time, it is widely studied in the field of geography, mostly as a theoretical concept in the subdomain of economic geography.

Weber maintained a commitment to philosophy of history. He contributed theories for analyzing social change in Western civilization as a confluence of civilization (intellectual and technological), social processes (organizations) and culture (art, religion, and philosophy).

== Least cost theory ==
Leaning heavily on work developed by the relatively unknown Wilhelm Launhardt, Alfred Weber formulated a least cost theory of industrial location which tries to explain and predict the locational pattern of industry at a macro scale. It emphasizes that firms seek a site with minimum costs for transport and labor.

== Material index ==
The point of optimal transportation is based on the costs of distance to the "material index (MI)" – the ratio of weights of the intermediate products (raw materials or RM) to finished product or FP.

a) RM is more than FP; MI>1

b) RM is equal to FP; MI=1

c) RM is less than FP; MI<1

In one scenario (a), the weight of the final product is less than the weight of the raw material going into making the product—the weight losing industry. For example, in the copper industry, it would be very expensive to haul raw materials to the market and process them there, so the processing occurs near the raw materials. (Besides mining, other primary activities (or extractive industries) are considered material oriented: timber mills, furniture manufacture, most agricultural activities, etc.. Often located in rural areas, these businesses may employ most of the local population. As they leave, the local area loses its economic base.)

In other cases, the final product is equally as heavy as the raw materials that require transport (i.e. the Material Index is equal to 1). Usually this is a case of some ubiquitous raw material, such as water, being incorporated into the product. This is called the weight-gaining industry. This type of industry might build up near a market or near a raw material source, and as a result might be called a foot-loose industry. Cotton industry is a prominent example of weight-gaining raw material.

In a third set of industries, including the heavy chemical industry, the weight of raw materials is less than the weight of the finished product. These industries always grow up near market.

Weber's point of optimal transportation is a generalization of the Fermat point problem. In its simplest form, the Fermat problem consists in locating a point D with respect to three points A, B, and C in such a way that the sum of the distances between D and each of the three other points is minimized. As for the Weber triangle problem, it consists in locating a point D with respect to three points A, B, and C in such a way that the sum of the transportation costs between D and each of the three other points is minimized. In 1971, Luc-Normand Tellier found the first direct (non iterative) numerical solution of the Fermat and Weber triangle problems. Long before Von Thünen's contributions, which go back to 1818, the Fermat point problem can be seen as the very beginning of space economy. It was formulated by the famous French mathematician Pierre de Fermat before 1640. As for the Weber triangle problem, which is a generalization of the Fermat triangle problem, it was first formulated by Thomas Simpson in 1750, and popularized by Alfred Weber in 1909.

In 1985, in a book entitled Économie spatiale: rationalité économique de l'espace habité, Tellier formulated an all-new problem called the "attraction-repulsion problem", which constitutes a generalization of both the Fermat and Weber problems. In its simplest version, the attraction-repulsion problem consists in locating a point D with respect to three points A1, A2 and R in such a way that the attractive forces exerted by points A1 and A2, and the repulsive force exerted by point R cancel each other out. In the same book, Tellier solved that problem for the first time in the triangle case, and he reinterpreted spatial economics theory, especially, the theory of land rent, in the light of the concepts of attractive and repulsive forces stemming from the attraction-repulsion problem. That problem was later further analyzed by mathematicians like Chen, Hansen, Jaumard and Tuy (1992), and Jalal and Krarup (2003). The attraction-repulsion problem is seen by Ottaviano and Thisse (2005) as a prelude to the New Economic Geography that developed in the 1990s, and earned Paul Krugman a Nobel Memorial Prize in Economic Sciences in 2008.

== Works ==
- Über den Standort der Industrie (Theory of the Location of Industries) 1909
- Ideen zur Staats - und Kultursoziologie (1927)
- Kulturgeschichte als Kultursoziologie (1935)
- Farewell to European History or the Conquest of Nihilism (1947)
- Einführung in die Soziologie (1955)

== See also ==
- Johann Heinrich von Thünen
- Sociology of knowledge
