= Weber problem =

Problem of minimizing sum of transport costs

In geometry, the Weber problem, named after Alfred Weber, is one of the most famous problems in location theory. It requires finding a point in the plane that minimizes the sum of the transportation costs from this point to n destination points, where different destination points are associated with different costs per unit distance.

The Weber problem generalizes the geometric median, which assumes transportation costs per unit distance are the same for all destination points, and the problem of computing the Fermat point, the geometric median of three points. For this reason it is sometimes called the Fermat–Weber problem, although the same name has also been used for the unweighted geometric median problem. The Weber problem is in turn generalized by the attraction–repulsion problem, which allows some of the costs to be negative, so that greater distance from some points is better.

== Definition and history of the Fermat, Weber, and attraction-repulsion problems ==
	The Fermat problem	The Weber problem	The attraction-repulsion problem
First formulated by	Fermat (before 1640)	Simpson (1750)	Tellier (1985)
Geometrical solution of the triangle problem	Torricelli (1645)	Simpson (1750)	Tellier (2013)
Direct numerical solution of the triangle problem	Tellier (1972)	Tellier (1972)	Tellier (1985)
Iterative numerical solution of the problem	E. Weiszfeld (1937), Kuhn and Kuenne (1962)	E. Weiszfeld (1937), Kuhn and Kuenne (1962)	Chen, Hansen, Jaumard and Tuy (1992)

In the triangle case, the Fermat problem consists in locating a point D with respect to three points A, B, C in such a way that the sum of the distances between D and each of the three other points is minimized. It was formulated by the famous French mathematician Pierre de Fermat before 1640, and it can be seen as the true beginning of both location theory, and space-economy. Torricelli found a geometrical solution to this problem around 1645, but it still had no direct numerical solution more than 325 years later. E. Weiszfeld published a paper in 1937 with an algorithm for the Fermat-Weber problem. As the paper was published in Tohoku Mathematical journal, and Weiszfeld immigrated to USA and changed his name to Vaszoni, his work was not widely known. Kuhn and Kuenne independently found a similar iterative solution for the general Fermat problem in 1962, and, in 1972, Tellier found a direct numerical solution to the Fermat triangle problem, which is trigonometric. Kuhn and Kuenne's solution applies to the case of polygons having more than three sides, which is not the case with Tellier's solution for reasons explained further on.

The Weber problem consists, in the triangle case, in locating a point D with respect to three points A, B, C in such a way that the sum of the transportation costs between D and each of the three other points is minimized. The Weber problem is a generalization of the Fermat problem since it involves both equal and unequal attractive forces (see below), while the Fermat problem only deals with equal attractive forces. It was first formulated, and solved geometrically in the triangle case, by Thomas Simpson in 1750. It was later popularized by Alfred Weber in 1909. Kuhn and Kuenne's iterative solution found in 1962, and Tellier's solution found in 1972 apply to the Weber triangle problem as well as to the Fermat one. Kuhn and Kuenne's solution applies also to the case of polygons having more than three sides.

In its simplest version, the attraction-repulsion problem consists in locating a point D with respect to three points A_{1}, A_{2} and R in such a way that the attractive forces exerted by points A_{1}, A_{2}, and the repulsive force exerted by point R cancel each other out as it must do at the optimum. It constitutes a generalization of both the Fermat and Weber problems. It was first formulated and solved, in the triangle case, in 1985 by Luc-Normand Tellier. In 1992, Chen, Hansen, Jaumard and Tuy found a solution to the Tellier problem for the case of polygons having more than three sides.

== Torricelli’s geometrical solution of the Fermat triangle problem ==
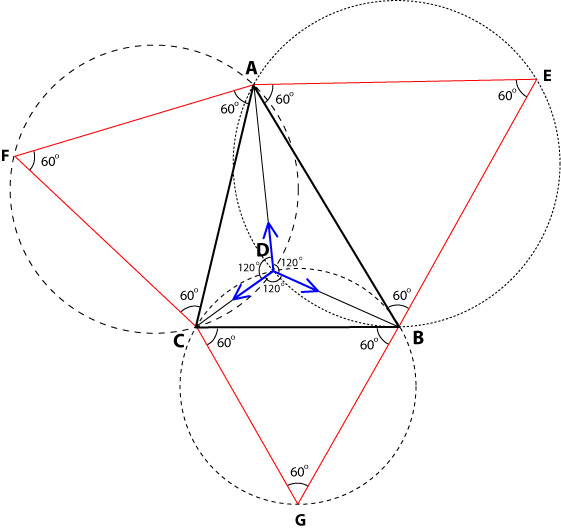
Torricelli's geometrical solution of the Fermat triangle problem.

Evangelista Torricelli’s geometrical solution of the Fermat triangle problem stems from two observations:

1. Point D is at its optimal location when any significant move out of that location induces a net increase of the total distance to reference points A, B, C, which means that the optimal point is the only point where an infinitesimal movement towards one of the three reference points induces a reduction of the distance to that point that is equal to the sum of the induced changes in the distances to the two other points; in fact, in the Fermat problem, the advantage to reduce the distance from A by one kilometer is equal to the advantage to reduce the distance from B by one kilometer or the distance from C by the same length; in other words, the activity to be located at D is equally attracted by A, B, C;
2. According to an important theorem of Euclidean geometry, in a convex quadrilateral inscribed in a circle, the opposite angles are supplementary (that is their sum is equal to 180°); that theorem can also take the following form: if we cut a circle with a chord A̅B̅, we get two circle arcs, let us say AiB, AjB; on arc AiB, any ∠AiB angle is the same for any chosen point i, and, on arc AjB, all the ∠AjB angles are also equal for any chosen point j; moreover, the ∠AiB, ∠AjB angles are supplementary.

It can be proved that the first observation implies that, at the optimum, the angles between the AD, BD, CD straight lines must be equal to 360° / 3 = 120°. Torricelli deduced from that conclusion that:

1. If any triangle △ABD, whose ∠ADB angle is equal to 120°, generates an ABDE convex quadrilateral inscribed in a circle, the ∠ABE angle of the △ABE triangle must be equal to (180° − 120°) = 60°;
2. One way to determine the set of locations of D for which the ∠ADB angle is equal to 120° is to draw an equilateral △ABE triangle (because each angle of an equilateral triangle is equal to 60°), where E is located outside the △ABC triangle, and draw a circle round that triangle; then all the D' points of the circumference of that circle that lie within the △ABC circle are such that the ∠AD'B angle is equal to 120°;
3. The same reasoning can be made with respect to triangles △ACD, △BCD;
4. This leads to draw two other equilateral triangles △ACF, △BCG, where F, G are located outside the △ABC triangle, as well as two other circles round these equilateral triangles, and to determine the location where the three circles intersect; at that location, the angles between the AD, BD, CD straight lines is necessarily equal to 120°, which proves that it is the optimal location.

== Simpson’s geometrical solution of the Weber triangle problem ==
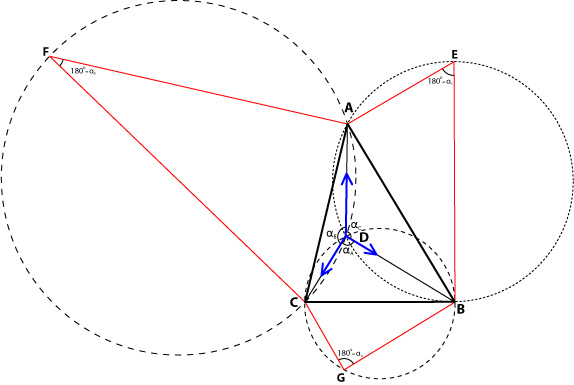
Simpson's geometrical solution of the Weber triangle problem.

Simpson's geometrical solution of the so-called "Weber triangle problem" (which was first formulated by Thomas Simpson in 1750) directly derives from Torricelli's solution. Simpson and Weber stressed the fact that, in a total transportation minimization problem, the advantage to get closer to each attraction point A, B or C depends on what is carried and on its transportation cost. Consequently, the advantage of getting one kilometer closer to A, B or C varies, and the ∠ADB, ∠ADC, ∠BDC angles no more need to be equal to 120°.

Simpson demonstrated that, in the same way as, in the Fermat triangle problem case, the constructed triangles △ABE, △ACF, △BCG were equilateral because the three attractive forces were equal, in the Weber triangle problem case, the constructed triangles △ABE, △ACF, △BCG, where E, F, G are located outside the △ABC triangle, must be proportional to the attractive forces of the location system.

The solution is such that:

1. In the constructed triangle △ABE, the AB side is proportional to the attractive force w_{C} pointing towards C, the AE side is proportional to the attractive force w_{B} pointing towards B, and the BE side is proportional to the attractive force w_{A} pointing towards A;
2. In the constructed triangle △BCG, the BC side is proportional to the attractive force w_{A} pointing towards A, the BG side is proportional to the attractive force w_{C} pointing towards B, and the CG side is proportional to the attractive force w_{B} pointing towards C;
3. The optimal point D is located at the intersection of the two circumferences drawn round the △ABE, △BCG constructed triangles.

A third triangle of forces △ACF, where F is located outside the △ABC triangle, can be drawn based on the AC side, and a third circumference can be traced round that triangle. That third circumference crosses the two previous ones at the same point D.

== Tellier’s geometrical solution of the attraction-repulsion triangle problem ==
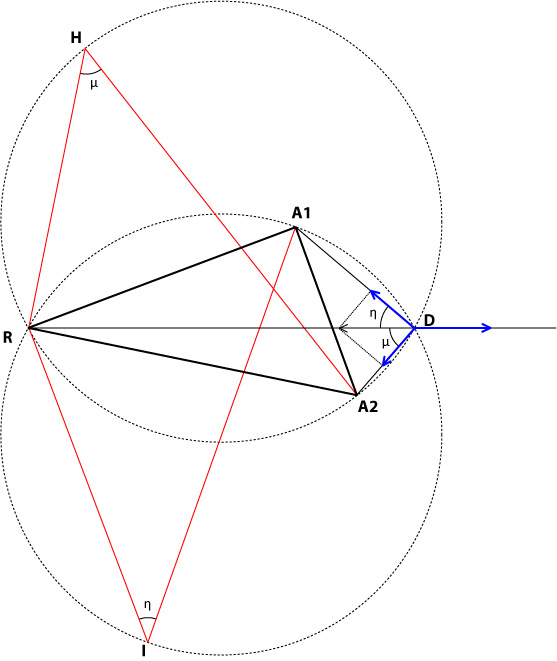
Tellier's geometrical solution of the attraction-repulsion triangle problem.

A geometrical solution exists for the attraction-repulsion triangle problem. Its discovery is rather recent. That geometrical solution differs from the two previous ones since, in this case, the two constructed force triangles overlap the △A_{1}A_{2}R location triangle (where A_{1} and A_{2} are attraction points, and R, a repulsion one), while, in the preceding cases, they never did.

This solution is such that:

1. In the constructed triangle △RA_{2}H, which partly overlaps the △A_{1}A_{2}R location triangle, the RA_{2} side is proportional to the attractive force w_{A1} pointing towards A_{1}, the RH side is proportional to the attractive force w_{A2} pointing towards A_{2}, and the A_{2}H side is proportional to the repulsive force w_{R} pushing away from point R;
2. In the constructed triangle △RA_{1}I, which partly overlaps the △A_{1}A_{2}R location triangle, the RA_{1} side is proportional to the attractive force w_{A2} pointing towards A_{2}, the RI side is proportional to the attractive force w_{A1} pointing towards A_{1}, and the A_{1}I side is proportional to the repulsive force w_{R} pushing away from point R;
3. The optimal point D is located at the intersection of the two circumferences drawn round the △RA_{2}H and △RA_{1}I constructed triangles.

This solution is useless if one of the forces is greater than the sum of the two other ones or if the angles are not compatible. In some cases, no force is larger than the two other ones, and the angles are not compatible; then, the optimal location lies at the point that exerts the greater attractive force.

== Tellier’s trigonometric solution of the Fermat and Weber triangle problems ==
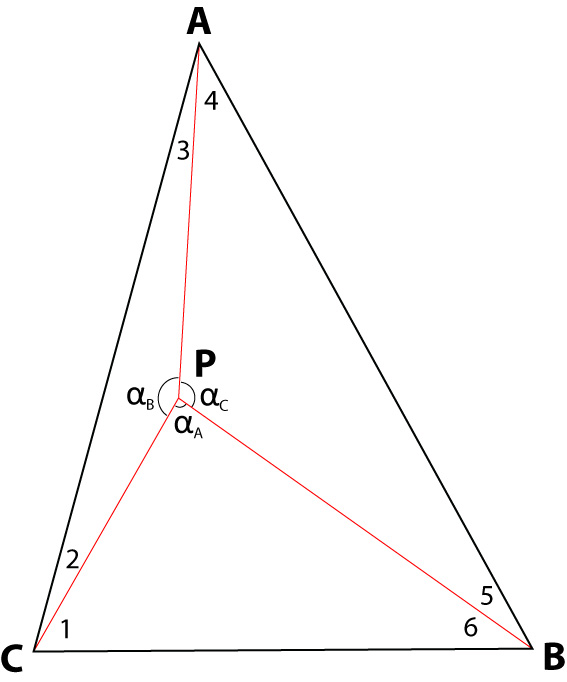
The angles of the Weber problem.

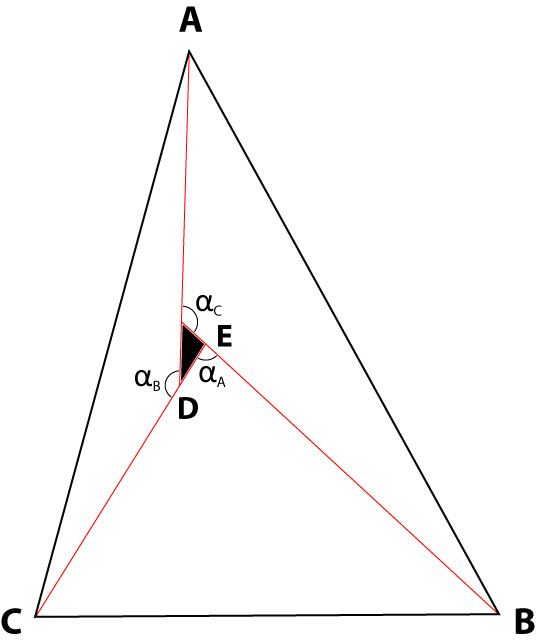
The case of non-coincidence of the vertices of the α angles.

More than 332 years separate the first formulation of the Fermat triangle problem and the discovery of its non-iterative numerical solution, while a geometrical solution existed for almost all that period of time. Is there an explanation for that? That explanation lies in the possibility of the origins of the three vectors oriented towards the three attraction points not coinciding. If those origins do coincide and lie at the optimum location P, the vectors oriented towards A, B, C, and the sides of the △ABC location triangle form the six angles ∠1, ∠2, ∠3, ∠4, ∠5, ∠6, and the three vectors form the ∠α_{A}, ∠α_{B}, ∠α_{C} angles. It is easy to write the following six equations linking six unknowns (the angles ∠1, ∠2, ∠3, ∠4, ∠5, ∠6) with six known values (angles ∠A, ∠B, ∠C, whose values are given, and angles ∠α_{A}, ∠α_{B}, ∠α_{C}, whose values depend only on the relative magnitude of the three attractive forces pointing towards the A, B, C attraction points):

$$\begin{align}
\angle 1 + \angle 2 &= \angle C ; \\
\angle 3 + \angle 4 &= \angle A ; \\
\angle 5 + \angle 6 &= \angle B ; \\[4pt]
\angle 1 + \angle 6 + \angle \alpha_A &= 180^\circ ; \\
\angle 2 + \angle 3 + \angle \alpha_B &= 180^\circ ; \\
\angle 4 + \angle 5 + \angle \alpha_C &= 180^\circ .
\end{align}$$

Unfortunately, this system of six simultaneous equations with six unknowns is undetermined, and the possibility of the origins of the three vectors oriented towards the three attraction points not coinciding explains why. In the case of non-coincidence, we observe that all the six equations are still valid. However, the optimal location P has disappeared because of the triangular hole that exists inside the triangle. In fact, as Tellier (1972) has shown, that triangular hole had exactly the same proportions as the "forces triangles" we drew in Simpson's geometrical solution.

In order to solve the problem, we must add to the six simultaneous equations a seventh requirement, which states that there should be no triangular hole in the middle of the location triangle. In other words, the origins of the three vectors must coincide.

Tellier's solution of the Fermat and Weber triangle problems involves three steps:

1. Determine the angles ∠α_{A}, ∠α_{B}, ∠α_{C} that are such that the three attractive forces w_{A}, w_{B}, w_{C} cancel each other to ensure equilibrium. This is done by means of the following independent equations:
  $$\begin{align}
\cos \angle\alpha_A = - \frac{w^2_B + w^2_C - w^2_A}{2 \, w_B w_C} ; \\
\cos \angle\alpha_B = - \frac{w^2_A + w^2_C - w^2_B}{2 \, w_A w_C} ; \\
\cos \angle\alpha_C = - \frac{w^2_A + w^2_B - w^2_C}{2 \, w_A w_B} ;
\end{align}$$
2. Determine the value of angle ∠3 (this equation derives from the requirement that point D must coincide with point E):
  $$\tan \angle 3 = \frac{k \sin k'}{1 + k \cos k'} ;$$
  where
  $$\begin{align}
k &= \frac{\overline{CB}}{\overline{CA}} \times \frac{\sin \angle \alpha_B}{\sin \angle\alpha_A}, \\[4pt]
k' &= (\angle A + \angle B +  \angle \alpha_C) - 180^\circ .
\end{align}$$
3. Solve the following system of simultaneous equations where ∠3 is now known:
  $$\begin{align}
\angle 1 + \angle 2 &= \angle C ; \\
\angle 3 + \angle 4 &= \angle A ; \\
\angle 5 + \angle 6 &= \angle B ; \\[4pt]
\angle 1 + \angle 6 + \angle \alpha_A &= 180^\circ ; \\
\angle 2 + \angle 3 + \angle \alpha_B &= 180^\circ ; \\
\angle 4 + \angle 5 + \angle \alpha_C &= 180^\circ .
\end{align}$$

== Tellier’s trigonometric solution of the triangle attraction-repulsion problem ==
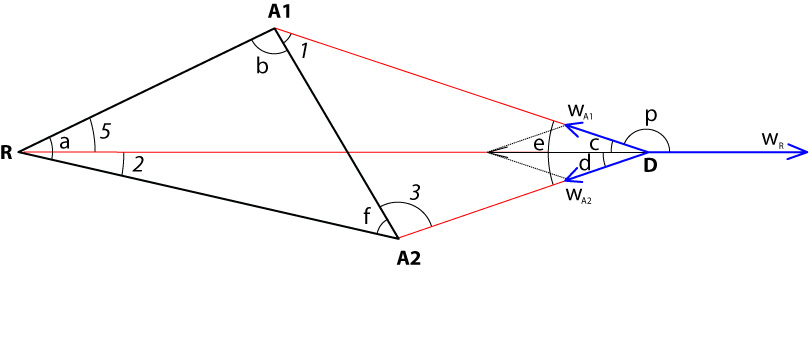
The angles of the attraction-repulsion triangle problem.

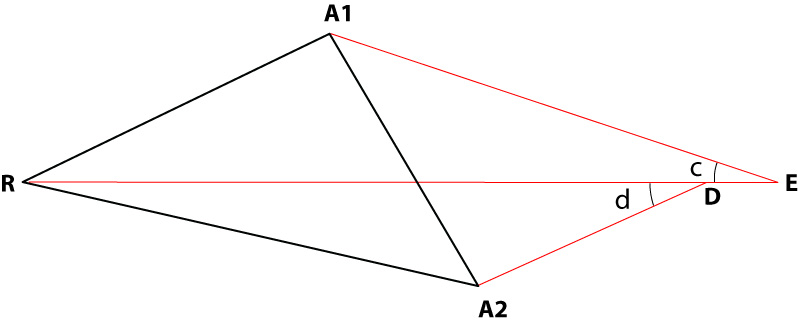
The case of non-coincidence of points D, E.

Tellier (1985) extended the Fermat–Weber problem to the case of repulsive forces. Let us examine the triangle case where there are two attractive forces w_{A1}, w_{A2}, and one repulsive force w_{R}. Here as in the previous case, the possibility exists for the origins of the three vectors not to coincide. So the solution must require their coinciding. Tellier's trigonometric solution of this problem is the following:

1. Determine angle ∠e:
  $$\cos \angle e = -\frac{w^2_{A1} + w^2_{A2} - w^2_R}{2 \, w_{A1} w_{A2}} ;$$
2. Determine angle ∠p:
  $$\cos \angle p = -\frac{w^2_{A1} + w^2_R - w^2_{A2}}{2 \, w_{A1} w_R} ;$$
3. Determine angle ∠c:
  $$\angle c = 180^\circ - \angle p ;$$
4. Determine angle ∠d:
  $$\angle d = \angle e - \angle c ;$$
5. Determine the value of angle ∠3 (this equation derives from the requirement that point D must coincide with point E):
  $$\tan \angle 3 = \frac{x}{y} ;$$
  where
  $$\begin{align}
x &= \sin \angle f - \frac{\overline{RA_1}}{\overline{RA_2}} \times \frac{\sin \angle d \sin(\angle e - \angle b)}{\sin \angle c} ; \\[4pt]
y &= \frac{\overline{RA_1}}{\overline{RA_2}} \times \frac{\sin \angle d \cos(\angle e - \angle b)}{\sin \angle c} - \cos \angle f ;
\end{align}$$
6. Determine ∠1:
  $$\angle 1 = 180^\circ - \angle e - \angle 3 ;$$
7. Determine ∠5:
  $$\angle 5 = 180^\circ - \angle b - \angle c - \angle 1 ;$$
8. Determine ∠2:
  $$\angle 2 = \angle a - \angle 5 .$$

== Iterative solutions of the Fermat, Weber and attraction-repulsion problems ==
When the number of forces is larger than three, it is no longer possible to determine the angles separating the various forces without taking into account the geometry of the location polygon. Geometric and trigonometric methods are then powerless. Iterative optimizing methods are used in such cases. Kuhn and Kuenne (1962) suggested an algorithm based on iteratively reweighted least squares generalizing Weiszfeld's algorithm for the unweighted problem. Their method is valid for the Fermat and Weber problems involving many forces, but not for the attraction–repulsion problem. In this method, to find an approximation to the point y minimizing the weighted sum of distances
$$\sum_{i=1}^n w_i\, \|x_i-y\|,$$
an initial approximation to the solution y_{0} is found, and then at each stage of the algorithm is moved closer to the optimal solution by setting y_{j + 1} to be the point minimizing the sum of weighted squared distances
$$\sum_{i=1}^n \frac{w_i}{\|x_i-y_j\|} \|x_i-y\|^2$$
where the initial weights w_{i} of the input points are divided by the distances from each point to the approximation from the previous stage. As the unique optimal solution to a weighted least squares problem, each successive approximation may be found as a weighted average:
$$y_{j+1} = \frac{\displaystyle \sum_{i=1}^n \frac{w_ix_i}{ |x_i - y_j| } }{\displaystyle \sum_{i=1}^n \frac{w_i}{| x_i - y_j| } }$$

The Varignon frame provides an experimental solution of the Weber problem.

For the attraction–repulsion problem one has instead to resort to the algorithm proposed by Chen, Hansen, Jaumard and Tuy (1992).

== Interpretation of the land rent theory in the light of the attraction–repulsion problem ==
In the world of spatial economics, repulsive forces are omnipresent. Land values are the main illustration of them. In fact a substantial portion of land value theory, both rural and urban, can be summed up in the following way.

In the case where everybody is attracted by a single attraction point (the rural market or the urban central business district), competition between the various bidders who all want to locate at the center will generate land values that will transform the unique attraction point of the system into a repulsion point from the land value point of view, and, at the equilibrium, each inhabitant and activity will be located at the point where the attractive and the repulsive forces exerted by the center on them will cancel out.

== The attraction–repulsion problem and the New Economic Geography ==
The Tellier problem preceded the emergence of the New Economic Geography. It is seen by Ottaviano and Thisse (2005) as a prelude to the New Economic Geography (NEG) that developed in the 1990s, and earned Paul Krugman a Nobel Memorial Prize in Economic Sciences in 2008. The concept of attractive force is akin to the NEG concept of agglomeration or centripetal force, and the concept of repulsive force is akin to the NEG concept of dispersal or centrifugal force.
