= Intermediate Reflection on the Economic Ethics of the World Religions =

1916 essay by Max Weber

"Intermediate Reflection on the Economic Ethics of the World Religions", also known as "Religious Rejections of the World and Their Directions" (German: Zwischenbetrachtung. Theorie der Stufen und Richtungen Religiöser Weltablehnung), is a 1916 essay written by Max Weber, a German economist and sociologist. The original edition was published in German as an essay in the 1916 issues of the German: Archiv für Sozialwissenschaft und Sozialpolitik, and various translations to English exist.

It is part of Weber's book series The Economic Ethics of the World Religions. In the essay, Weber analysed the different value-spheres in life, including intellectual, aesthetic, religious, economic, erotic, and political. Its discussion of the erotic was influenced by Weber's relationships with Else von Richthofen and Mina Tobler.

== General and cited sources ==
- Lepsius, M. Rainer (January 2004). "Mina Tobler and Max Weber: Passion Confined". Max Weber Studies. 4 (1). Translated by Whimster, Sam: 9–21. doi:10.15543/MWS/2004/1/3. ISSN 1470-8078. JSTOR 24579657. S2CID 146542227.
- Radkau, Joachim (2009). Max Weber: A Biography. Translated by Camiller, Patrick. Cambridge: Polity. ISBN 978-0-7456-4147-8. OCLC 1392375367. S2CID 170999086.
- Swedberg, Richard; Agevall, Ola (2016). The Max Weber Dictionary: Key Words and Central Concepts (Second ed.). Stanford University Press. doi:10.1515/9781503600225. ISBN 978-1-5036-0022-5. OCLC 956984918.
- Whimster, Sam (December 1995). "Max Weber on the Erotic and Some Comparisons With the Work of Foucault". International Sociology. 10 (4): 447–462. doi:10.1177/026858095010004006. ISSN 0268-5809. S2CID 143771412.
