= Max Weber =

German social scientist (1864–1920)

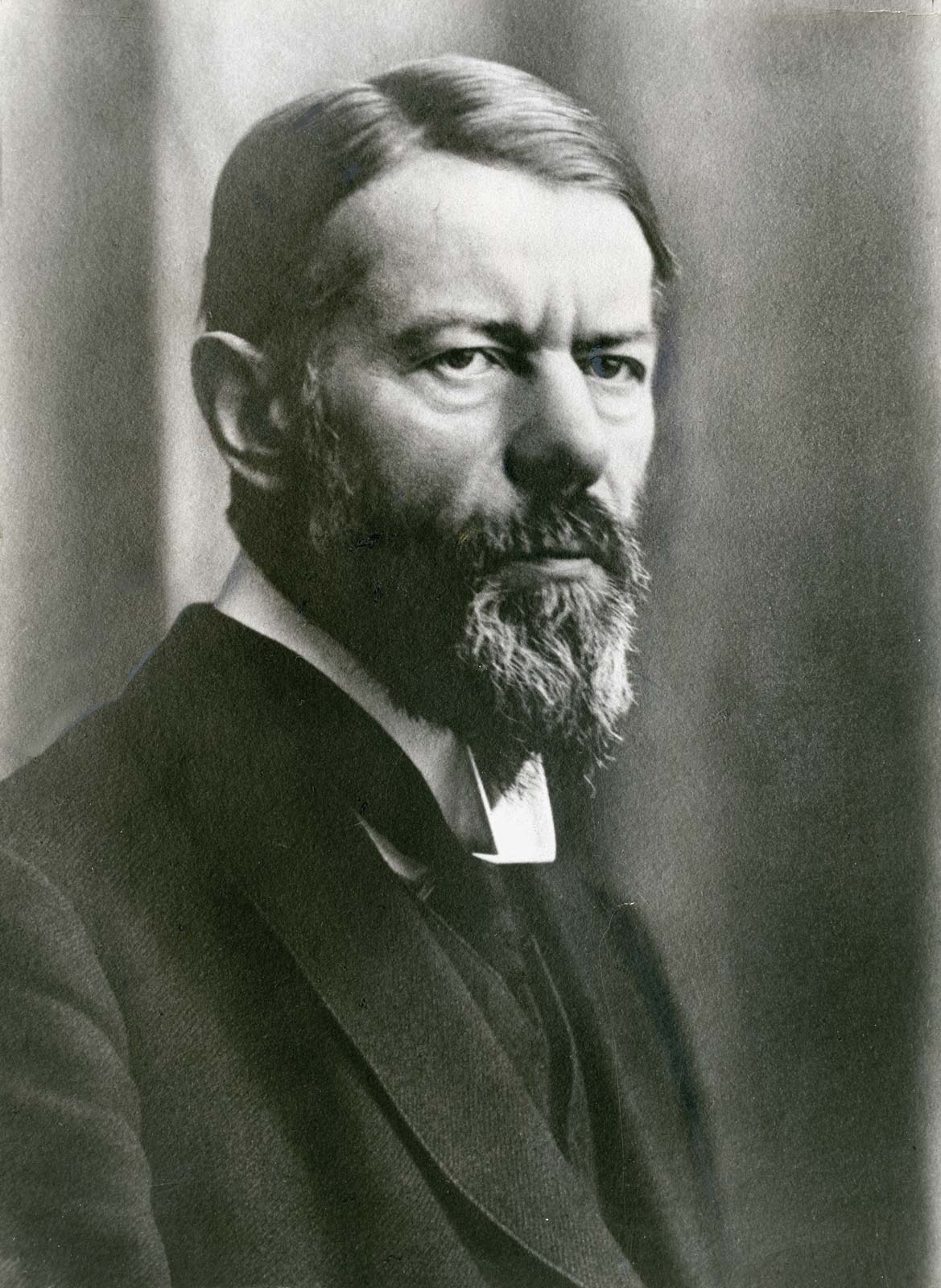
- Weber in 1918
- Born: Maximilian Carl Emil Weber; 21 April 1864; Erfurt, Province of Saxony, Kingdom of Prussia
- Died: 14 June 1920 (aged 56); Munich, Bavaria, Weimar Republic
- Spouse: Marianne Schnitger (m. 1893)
- Partners: Else von Richthofen
- Father: Max Weber Sr.
- Relatives: Alfred Weber

Education
- Education: Heidelberg University; University of Strasbourg; University of Berlin; University of Göttingen
- Theses: The History of Commercial Partnerships in the Middle Ages, Based on Southern European Documents (1889); Roman Agrarian History and Its Significance for Public and Private Law (1891)
- Doctoral advisors: Rudolf von Gneist; Levin Goldschmidt; August Meitzen

Philosophical work
- School: Continental philosophy; antipositivism; liberalism
- Institutions: University of Berlin; University of Freiburg; Heidelberg University; University of Vienna; LMU Munich
- Doctoral students: Else von Richthofen
- Main interests: History; economics; sociology; law; religion
- Notable works: "The 'Objectivity' of Knowledge in Social Science and Social Policy"; The Protestant Ethic and the Spirit of Capitalism (1904–1905); The Economic Ethics of the World Religions (1915–1921); "Science as a Vocation" (1917); "Politics as a Vocation" (1919); Economy and Society (1921–1922); General Economic History (1923)
- Notable ideas: List: Bureaucracy; Charisma; Disenchantment; Ethic of ultimate ends; Ideal type; Inner-worldly asceticism; Iron cage; Life chances; Methodological individualism; Monopoly on the legitimate use of force within a given area; Patrimonialism; Political capitalism; Protestant work ethic; Rationalisation; Social action (affectional, traditional, instrumental, and value-rational); Three-component theory of stratification (class, party, and status); Tripartite classification of authority (charismatic, rational-legal, and traditional); Value-freedom; Verstehen

Maximilian Carl Emil Weber (/ˈveɪbər/ VAY-ber; German: [ˈveːbɐ]; 21 April 1864 – 14 June 1920) was a German sociologist, historian, jurist, and political economist who was one of the central figures in the development of sociology and the social sciences more generally. His ideas continue to influence social theory and research.

Born in Erfurt in 1864, Weber studied law and history in Berlin, Göttingen, and Heidelberg. After earning his doctorate in law in 1889 and habilitation in 1891, he taught in Berlin, Freiburg, and Heidelberg. He married his cousin Marianne Schnitger two years later. In 1897, he had a breakdown after his father died following an argument. Weber ceased teaching and travelled until the early 1900s. He recovered and wrote The Protestant Ethic and the Spirit of Capitalism. During the First World War, he initially supported Germany's war effort but became critical of it and supported democratisation. He also gave the lectures "Science as a Vocation" and "Politics as a Vocation". After the war, Weber co-founded the German Democratic Party, unsuccessfully ran for office, and advised the drafting of the Weimar Constitution. Meanwhile, he resumed teaching in Vienna and Munich. He died of pneumonia in 1920 at the age of 56, possibly as a result of the Spanish flu. A book, Economy and Society, was left unfinished.

One of Weber's main intellectual concerns was in understanding the processes of rationalisation and disenchantment. He formulated a thesis arguing that such processes were associated with the rise of capitalism and modernity. Weber also argued that the Protestant work ethic influenced the creation of modern capitalism in The Protestant Ethic and the Spirit of Capitalism. It was followed by The Economic Ethics of the World Religions, where he examined the religions of China, India, and ancient Judaism. In terms of government, Weber argued that states were defined by their monopoly on the legitimate use of force within a given area and categorised social authority into three distinct forms: charismatic, traditional, and rational-legal. He was also a key proponent of methodological antipositivism, arguing for the study of social action through interpretive rather than purely empiricist methods. Weber made a variety of other contributions to economic sociology, political sociology, and the sociology of religion.

After his death, the rise of Weberian scholarship was slowed by the Weimar Republic's political instability and the rise of Nazi Germany. In the post-war era, organised scholarship began to appear, led by Talcott Parsons. Other American and British scholars were also involved in its development. Over the course of the twentieth century, Weber's reputation grew as translations of his works became widely available and scholars increasingly engaged with his life and ideas. As a result of these works, he began to be regarded as a founding father of sociology, alongside Karl Marx and Émile Durkheim, and one of the central figures in the development of the social sciences more generally.

== Biography ==
=== Early life and education ===
Maximilian Carl Emil Weber was born on 21 April 1864 in Erfurt, Province of Saxony, Kingdom of Prussia. He was raised in Charlottenburg after his family moved there in 1869. He was the oldest of Max Weber Sr. and Helene Fallenstein's eight children. Over the course of his life, Weber Sr. held posts as a lawyer, civil servant, and parliamentarian for the National Liberal Party in the Prussian Landtag and German Reichstag. This immersed his home in both politics and academia, as his salon welcomed scholars and public figures such as the philosopher Wilhelm Dilthey, the jurist Levin Goldschmidt, and the historian Theodor Mommsen. The young Weber and his brother Alfred, who also became a sociologist, spent their formative years in this intellectual atmosphere. Meanwhile, Fallenstein was partly descended from the French Huguenot Souchay family, which had obtained wealth through international commerce and the textile industry. Over time, Weber was affected by the marital and personality tensions between his father, who enjoyed material pleasures while overlooking religious and philanthropic causes, and his mother, a devout Calvinist and philanthropist.

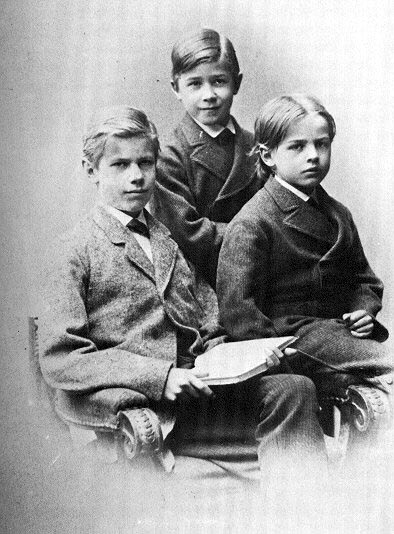
Max Weber (left) and his brothers, Alfred (center) and Karl (right), in 1879

Weber entered the Doebbelinsche Privatschule in Charlottenburg in 1870, before attending the Kaiserin-Augusta-Gymnasium between 1872 and 1882. While in class, bored and unimpressed with his teachers, Weber secretly read all forty of Johann Friedrich Cotta's volumes of the writer Johann Wolfgang von Goethe's works. Before graduating, he read many other classical works, including those by the philosopher Immanuel Kant. For Christmas in 1877, a thirteen-year-old Weber gifted his parents two historical essays, entitled "About the Course of German History, with Special Reference to the Positions of the Emperor and the Pope" and "About the Roman Imperial Period from Constantine to the Migration Period". Two years later, also during Christmastime, he wrote another historical essay, "Observations on the Ethnic Character, Development, and History of the Indo-European Nations". These three essays were non-derivative contributions to the philosophy of history and resulted from Weber's reading of many sources.

In 1882, Weber enrolled in Heidelberg University as a law student, later studying at the Royal Friedrich Wilhelm University of Berlin and the University of Göttingen. Weber's university years were dotted with periods of military service, the longest lasted between October 1883 and September 1884. During it, he attended classes that his uncle, the historian Hermann Baumgarten, taught at the University of Strasbourg. Weber befriended Baumgarten, who influenced Weber's growing liberalism and criticism of Otto von Bismarck's domination of German politics. Weber was a member of the Burschenschaft Allemannia Heidelberg, a Studentenverbindung (student association), and heavily drank beer and engaged in academic fencing during his first few university years. The latter resulted in him obtaining several duelling scars on the left side of his face. His mother was displeased by his behaviour and slapped him after he came home when his third semester ended in 1883. However, Weber matured, increasingly supported his mother in family arguments, and grew estranged from his father.

On 15 May 1886, Weber passed the Referendar legal training examination. He practiced law and lectured simultaneously with his studies. Under the tutelage of Levin Goldschmidt and Rudolf von Gneist, Weber wrote a legal history dissertation titled Development of the Principle of Joint Liability and a Separate Fund of the General Partnership out of the Household Communities and Commercial Associations in Italian Cities in 1889. It was part of a longer work, The History of Commercial Partnerships in the Middle Ages, Based on Southern European Documents, which he published later that year. In the same year, Weber began working on his habilitation, a post-doctoral thesis, with the statistician August Meitzen and completed it two years later. His habilitation, titled Roman Agrarian History and Its Significance for Public and Private Law, focused on Roman surveying and Roman agrarian law's relationship. Theodor Mommsen was present and debated with him during his defence, later indicating that he wanted Weber to succeed him. Having thus become a Privatdozent, Weber joined the Royal Friedrich Wilhelm University of Berlin's faculty, lecturing, conducting research, and engaging in government consulting.

=== Marriage, early work, and breakdown ===
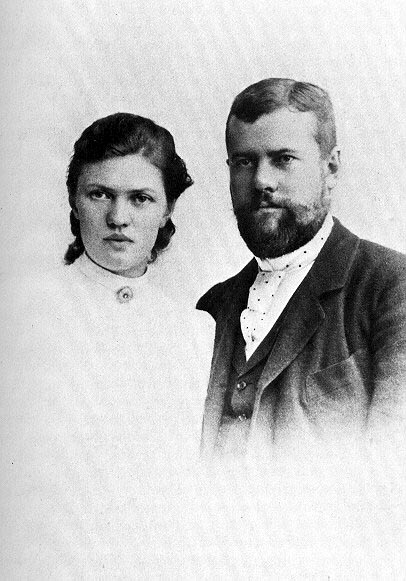
Max Weber and his wife Marianne in 1894

From 1887 until her declining mental health caused him to end it five years later, Weber had a semi-engagement with Emmy Baumgarten, Hermann Baumgarten's daughter. Afterwards, he began a relationship with his second cousin Marianne Schnitger in 1893 and married her on 20 September of that year in Oerlinghausen. The marriage gave Weber financial independence, allowing him to leave his parents' household. They had no children. Marianne was a feminist activist and an author in her own right. Academically, between completing his dissertation and habilitation, Weber became interested in contemporary social policy and joined the Verein für Socialpolitik (Association for Social Policy) in 1888. The Verein was an organisation of reformist thinkers who were generally members of the historical school of economics. Weber also became politically involved, participating in the founding of the left-leaning Evangelical Social Congress in 1890. It applied a Protestant perspective to the social question debate. In the same year, the Verein established a research program examining the Ostflucht, which was the western migration of ethnically German East Elbian agricultural labourers and the corresponding influx of Polish farm workers. Weber was given control of the study and wrote part of the final report, generating attention and political controversy.

From 1893 to 1899, Weber was a Pan-German League (Alldeutscher Verband) member. They opposed the influx of Polish workers. How much he supported the Germanisation of Poles and similar German nationalist policies is debated by scholars. Weber and his wife moved to Freiburg in 1894, where he was appointed professor of economics at the University of Freiburg. His 1895 inaugural lecture, "The Nation State and Economic Policy", criticised Polish immigration and argued that the Junkers encouraged it to serve their economic interests over those of Germany. It influenced the politician Friedrich Naumann to create the National-Social Association, which was a Christian socialist and German nationalist political organisation. Weber was pessimistic regarding its potential success, and it dissolved after winning a single Reichstag seat in the 1903 German federal election. In 1896, he was appointed to a Heidelberg University economics and finance chair. There, Weber and his wife became central to the eponymous Weber Circle, which included Georg Jellinek, Ernst Troeltsch, and Werner Sombart. Younger scholars, such as György Lukács and Robert Michels, also joined it.

In June 1897, Weber had a severe quarrel with his father over his father's treatment of his mother. Weber Sr. died two months later during a trip to Riga, leaving the argument unresolved. Afterwards, Weber became increasingly depressed, nervous, and insomniac, making it difficult for him to fulfill his professorial duties. He sought a teaching exemption, which was granted in 1899. He stayed in the Heilanstalt für Nervenkranke Konstanzer Hof in 1898 and in a different sanatorium in Bad Urach in 1900. Weber also travelled to Corsica and Italy between 1899 and 1903 to recuperate. He fully withdrew from teaching in 1903 and did not return to it until 1918. Weber thoroughly described his ordeal with mental illness in a personal chronology that his widow later destroyed. She potentially feared that the Nazis would discredit his work if his experience with mental illness were widely known.

=== Recovery and reintroduction to academia ===
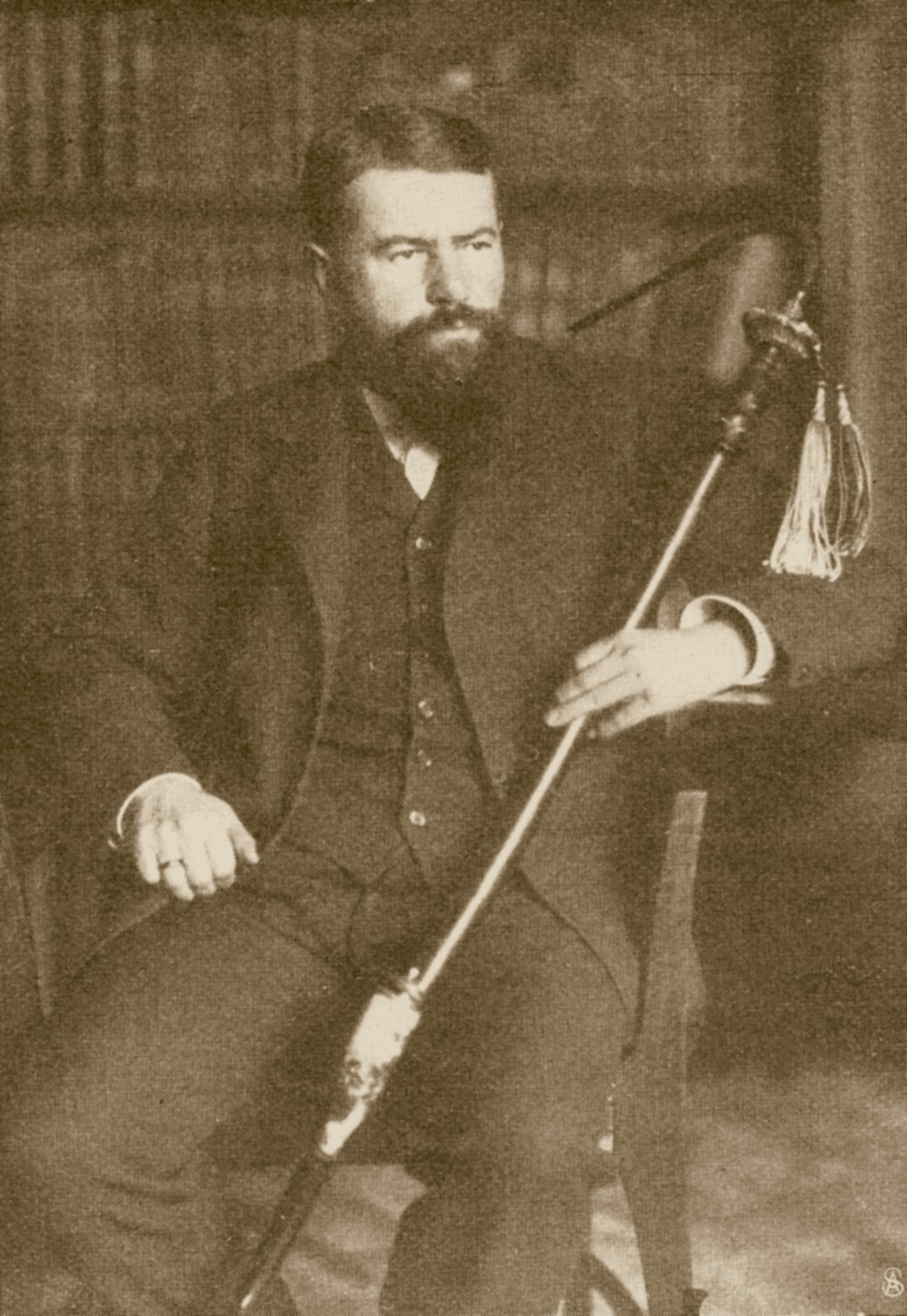
Max Weber in 1907

After recovering from his illness, Weber became an associate editor of the Archiv für Sozialwissenschaft und Sozialpolitik (Archive for Social Science and Social Policy) in 1904, alongside his colleagues Edgar Jaffé and Werner Sombart. He made it one of the most prominent social science journals. Weber published some of his most seminal works in it, including his book The Protestant Ethic and the Spirit of Capitalism, which became his most famous work and influenced his later research on religion's impact on economic systems' development. Also in 1904, he participated in the Congress of Arts and Sciences that was part of the Louisiana Purchase Exposition – the World's fair – in St. Louis. He went alongside his wife, Werner Sombart, Ernst Troeltsch, and other German scholars. Taking advantage of it, the Webers travelled throughout the country for almost three months in a round trip that began and ended in New York City. Different communities were visited, including German immigrant towns and African American communities. He also visited some of his Fallenstein family relatives in North Carolina. He learned more about America's social, economic, and theological conditions and their relationship with his thesis. Afterwards, Weber felt unable to resume teaching and remained a private scholar, helped by an inheritance in 1907.

Shortly after returning, Weber's attention shifted to the then-recent Russian Revolution of 1905. He learned the Russian language in a few months, subscribed to Russian newspapers, and discussed Russian political and social affairs with the Heidelberg Russian émigré community. He was popular amongst them and twice considered travelling to Russia, but his schedule prevented it. While he was sceptical of the revolution's ability to succeed, Weber supported the establishment of a Russian liberal democracy. He wrote two essays on it that were published in the Archiv. Weber thought that the peasants' desire for land caused the revolution. He discussed the role of the obshchina, rural peasant communities, in Russian political debates. According to Weber, they were difficult for liberal agrarian reformers to abolish due to their basis in natural law and the rising kulak class self-interestedly manipulating them. He generally interpreted the Russian Revolution as lacking a clear leader and the result of the peasants' emotional passions, not the Russian intellectuals' goals.

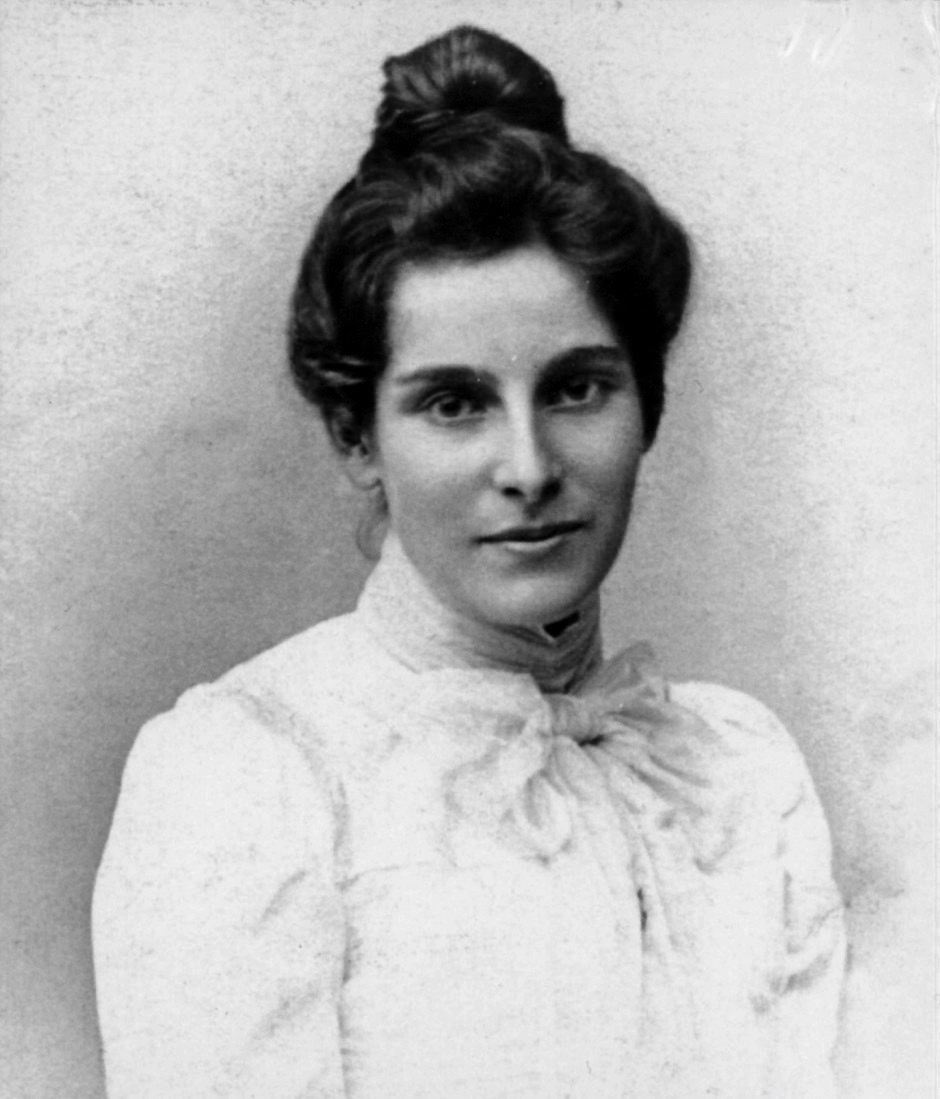
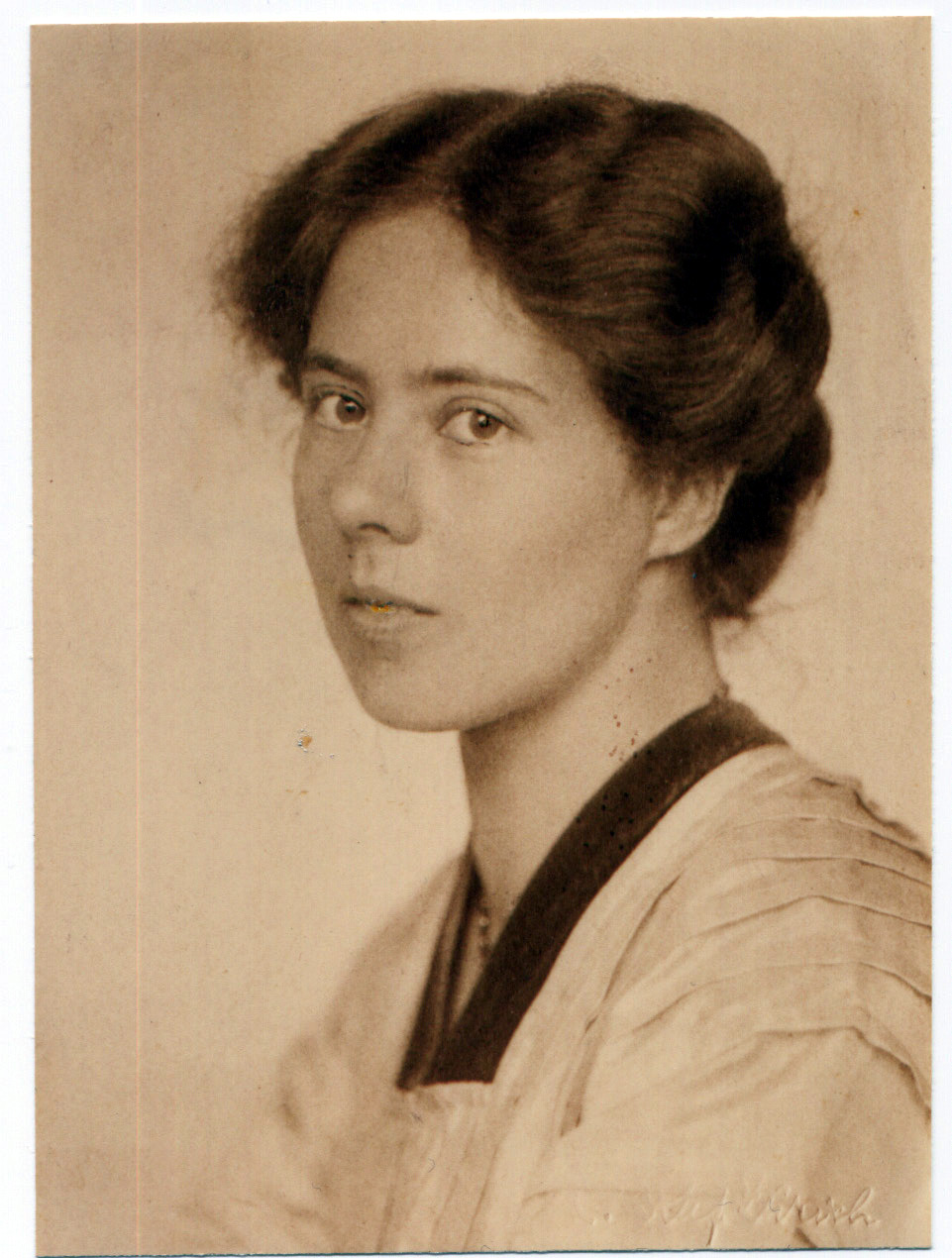
Else von Richthofen and Mina Tobler, Max Weber's mistresses

In 1909, having become increasingly dissatisfied with the political conservatism and perceived lack of methodological discipline of the Verein, he co-founded the German Sociological Association (Deutsche Gesellschaft für Soziologie) and was its first treasurer. Weber associated it with the Verein and viewed them as not having been competitors. He unsuccessfully tried to steer the association's direction. As part of that, Weber tried to make the Archiv its official journal. He resigned from his position as treasurer in 1912. His support for value-freedom in the social sciences caused that, as it was a controversial position in the association. Also in 1909, Weber and his wife Marianne traveled to Venice with Else von Richthofen, a former student of his and her longtime friend. The couple also befriended pianist Mina Tobler. After failing to court Richthofen, Weber began an affair with Tobler in 1911. Multiple scholars and Weber's nephew Eduard Baumgarten have attributed Weber's "Intermediate Reflection" on religion, salvation, and the erotic in The Economic Ethics of the World Religions book series to his feelings for Richthofen and Tobler.

Later, during the spring of 1913, Weber holidayed in the Monte Verità community in Ascona, Switzerland. While holidaying, he advised Frieda Gross in her custody battle for her children. He opposed Erich Mühsam's involvement because of Mühsam's anarchism. Weber argued that the case needed to be dealt with by bourgeois reformers who were not "derailed". A year later, also in spring, he again holidayed in Ascona. The community contained several different then-contemporaneous radical political and lifestyle reform movements, including naturism, free love, and Western esotericism, among others. Weber was critical of the Ascona anarchist and erotic movements, as he viewed their fusion as having been politically absurd.

=== First World War and political involvement ===
After the First World War began in 1914, Weber volunteered for service and was appointed as a reserve officer in charge of organising the Heidelberg army hospitals, a role he fulfilled until the end of 1915. Over the course of it, his views on the war and the German Empire's expansion changed. Early on, he strongly supported the German war effort. However, Weber later became one of the most prominent critics of both German expansionism and the Kaiser's war policies. He publicly criticised Germany's potential annexation of Belgium and unrestricted submarine warfare, later supporting calls for constitutional reform, democratisation, and universal suffrage. The death of his previously derided younger brother Karl, an architect, while fighting near Brest-Litovsk in 1915 made him relate to him.

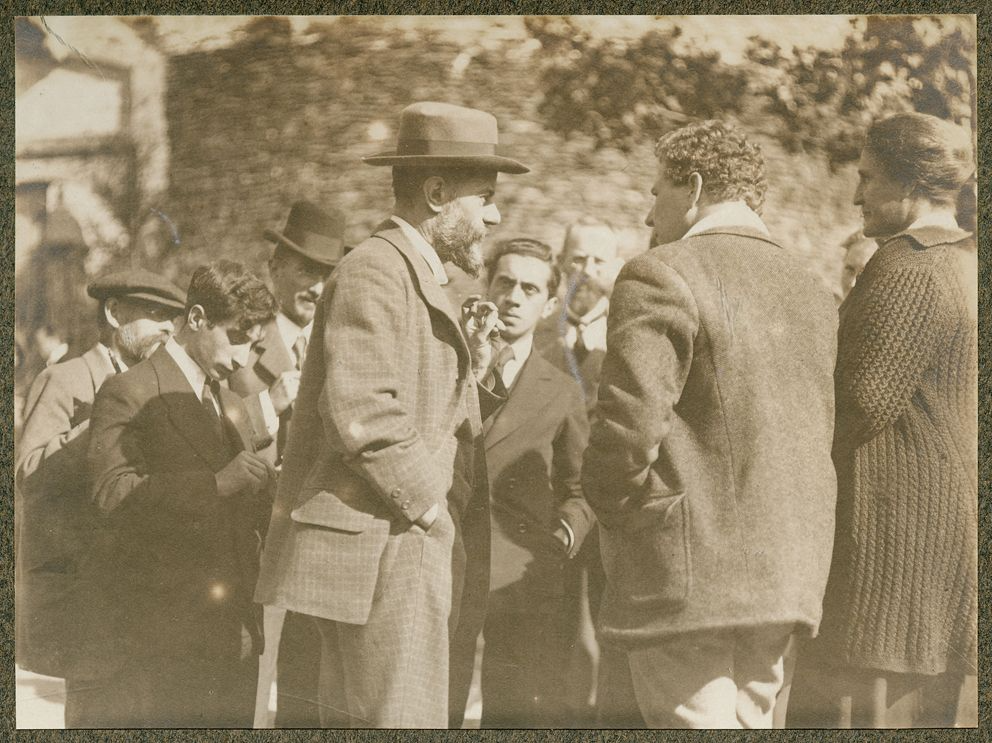
Max Weber (facing right) with Ernst Toller (facing camera) during the Lauenstein Conferences in 1917

He and his wife participated in the 1917 Lauenstein Conferences at Lauenstein Castle in Bavaria. These conferences were planned by the publisher Eugen Diederichs and brought together intellectuals, including Theodor Heuss, Ernst Toller, and Werner Sombart. Weber's presence elevated his profile in Germany and dispelled some of the event's romantic atmosphere. He was involved in the planning for the second one, as Diederichs thought that the conferences needed an oppositional figure. Weber argued against the former theologian Max Maurenbrecher's political romanticism and also opposed what he saw as the youth groups and nationalists' excessive rhetoric, instead supporting German democratisation. For him and the younger participants, the conferences' romanticism could not determine Germany's future. In November, shortly after the second conference, Weber was invited by the Free Student Youth – a student organisation – to lecture in Munich, resulting in "Science as a Vocation". In it, he argued that an inner calling and specialisation were necessary for one to become a scholar. Weber also began a sadomasochistic affair with Else von Richthofen the next year. Meanwhile, she was simultaneously conducting an affair with his brother, Alfred. Max Weber's affairs with Richtofen and Mina Tobler lasted until his death in 1920.

After the war, Weber unsuccessfully ran for a Weimar National Assembly seat in January 1919 for the liberal German Democratic Party, which he had co-founded. He also advised the National Assembly's drafting of the Weimar Constitution. While campaigning, Weber critiqued the left and criticised the leftist Spartacus League's leaders, Karl Liebknecht and Rosa Luxemburg. He thought that the German Revolution of 1918–1919 prevented Germany from contesting Poland's claims on its eastern territories. His opposition to the revolution may have prevented Friedrich Ebert, the new Social Democratic Party president of Germany, from appointing him as a minister or ambassador. Weber also criticized the Treaty of Versailles, which he believed unjustly assigned war guilt to Germany. Instead, he believed that many countries were guilty, not just Germany. Weber argued that Russia was the only great power that desired the war. Overall, Weber's political efforts were unsuccessful, other than supporting a democratically elected and strong presidency. On 28 January 1919, after his electoral defeat, Weber delivered a lecture titled "Politics as a Vocation", which discussed politics. It was prompted by the early Weimar Republic's political turmoil and was requested by the Free Student Youth. Shortly before joining the Versailles delegation on 13 May 1919, Weber used his connections with the German National People's Party's deputies to meet Erich Ludendorff and spent several hours unsuccessfully convincing him to surrender himself to the Allies.

=== Last years ===
Partially because he and his family lost money investing in war bonds, Weber resumed teaching, first at the University of Vienna in 1918, then at LMU Munich in 1919. In Vienna, Weber filled a vacant political economy chair that he had been considered for since October 1917. While there, he gave a lecture titled "Socialism" on the eponymous subject to a group of Austro-Hungarian Army officers. He also had a heated debate with Joseph Schumpeter at the Café Landtmann on the usability of the Russian Soviet Federative Socialist Republic as a case study for communism. Later, in Munich, Weber was appointed to Lujo Brentano's social science, economic history, and political economy chair. He accepted it to be closer to his mistress, Else von Richthofen. Responding to student requests, he gave a lecture series on economic history. The student transcriptions were later edited and published as the General Economic History by Siegmund Hellmann and Melchior Palyi in 1923. In terms of politics, he opposed the pardoning of the Bavarian Minister-President Kurt Eisner's murderer, Anton Graf von Arco auf Valley. In response, right-wing students disrupted his classes and protested outside his home. In early 1920, Weber discussed Oswald Spengler's The Decline of the West in a seminar, provoking students – who personally knew Spengler – to suggest that he debate Spengler alongside other scholars. They debated for two days in the Munich town hall, but the students felt that the question of how to resolve Germany's post-war issues remained unanswered.

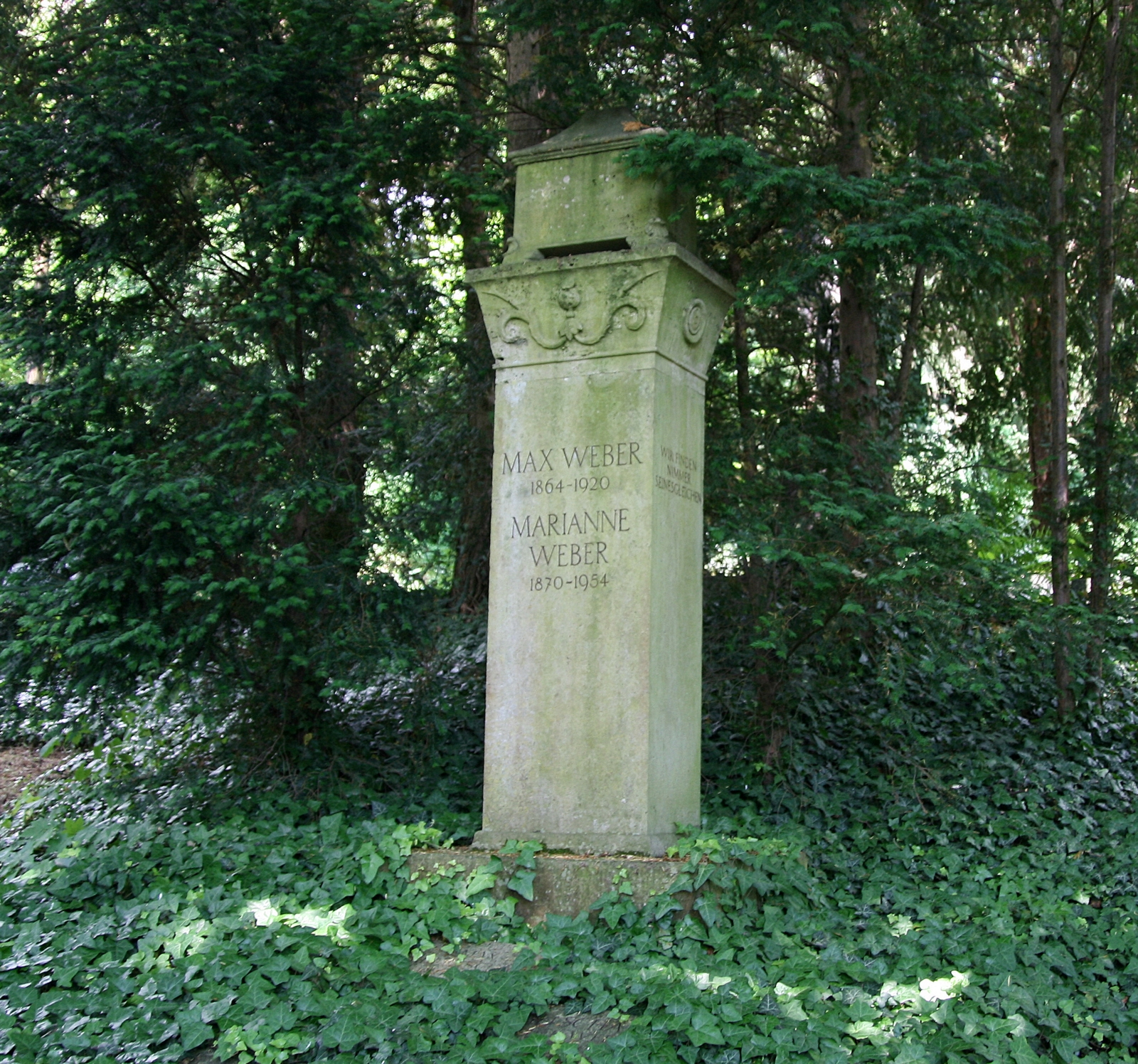
Max Weber's grave in Heidelberg

Lili Schäfer, one of Weber's sisters, unexpectedly committed suicide on 7 April 1920 after the pedagogue Paul Geheeb ended his affair with her. As a result of her depression, Weber had been taking care of her after her husband's death on 26 August 1914. Since he had also previously experienced suicidal feelings, he respected it, and thought that her suicide was justifiable and that suicide in general could be honourable. The Webers took in Lili's four children and planned to raise them. Weber was uncomfortable with his newfound role as a father figure, but thought that it fulfilled Marianne as a woman. She formally adopted the children in 1927. Weber wanted her to stay with them in Heidelberg or move closer to Geheeb's Odenwaldschule (Odenwald School) so that he could be alone in Munich with his mistress, Else von Richthofen. He left the decision to Marianne, but she said that only he could make the decision to leave for himself. While this was occurring, Weber began to believe that his own life had reached its end.

On 4 June 1920, Weber's students were informed that he had a cold and needed to cancel classes. By 14 June 1920, the cold had turned into influenza and he died of pneumonia in Munich. He had likely contracted the Spanish flu and been subjected to insufficient medical care. Else von Richthofen, who was present by his deathbed alongside his wife, thought that he could have survived his illness if he had been given better treatment. His body was cremated in the Munich Ostfriedhof after a secular ceremony, and his cinerary urn was later buried in the Heidelberg Bergfriedhof in 1921. The funeral service was attended by his students, including Eduard Baumgarten and Karl Loewenstein, and fellow scholars, such as Lujo Brentano. Weber had not finished writing Economy and Society, his sociological theory magnum opus. His widow, Marianne, helped prepare it for its publication between 1921 and 1922. She later published a Weber biography in 1926 which became one of the central historical accounts of his life.

== Methodology ==
Social action was the central focus of Weber's sociology. He also considered it an important part of the field's scientific nature. He divided social action into the four categories of affectional, traditional, instrumental, and value-rational action. Affectional actions were caused by an actor's emotions. Traditional actions were based on tradition. Instrumental actions were calculated attempts to achieve goals. Value-rational actions were attempts to enact one's values. His methodology was different from those of Émile Durkheim and Karl Marx in that he primarily focused on individuals and culture. Whereas Durkheim focused on society, Weber concentrated on individuals and their actions. Meanwhile, compared to Marx's support for the material world's primacy over the world of ideas, Weber valued ideas as motivating individuals' actions. His perspective on structure and action and macrostructure differed from theirs in that he was open to the idea that social phenomena could have multiple causes and placed importance on social actors' interpretations of their actions.

=== Verstehen ===
The result of what has been said so far is that an "objective" treatment of cultural occurrences, in the sense that the ideal aim of scientific work would be to reduce the empirical [reality] to "laws", is absurd. Not because – as it has often been claimed – the course of cultural processes or, say, processes in the human mind would, "objectively" speaking, be less law-like, but for the following two reasons: (1) knowledge of social laws does not constitute knowledge of social reality, but is only one of the various tools that our intellect needs for that [latter] purpose; (2) knowledge of cultural occurrences is only conceivable if it takes as its point of departure the significance that the reality of life, with its always individual character, has for us in certain particular respects. No law can reveal to us in what sense and in what respects this will be the case, as that is determined by those value ideas in the light of which we look at "culture" in each individual case.

— Max Weber in "The 'Objectivity' of Knowledge in Social Science and Social Policy", 1904.

In terms of methodology, Weber was primarily concerned with objectivity and subjectivity, distinguishing social action from social behavior, and noting that social action must be understood through individuals' subjective relationships. According to him, the study of social action through interpretive means or verstehen (to understand) needed to be based upon understanding the subjective meaning and purpose that individuals attached to their actions. Determining an individual's interpretation of their actions required either empathically or rationally derived evidence. Weber noted that subjectivity's importance in the social sciences made the creation of fool-proof, universal laws harder than in the natural sciences and that the amount of objective knowledge that social sciences were able to create was limited. Overall, he supported objective science as a goal worth striving for but noted that it was ultimately unreachable.

Weber's methodology was developed in the context of wider social scientific methodological debates. The first of which was the Methodenstreit (method dispute). In it, he was close to historicism, as he thought that social actions were heavily tied to historical contexts. He also emphasised the use of comparative historical analysis and was more interested in explaining how an outcome was the result of various historical processes than in predicting those processes' future outcomes. The second debate that shaped Weber's perspective on methodology was the Werturteilsstreit (value-judgement dispute). This debate was held between 1909 and 1914 on value-judgements in the social sciences. It originated with a Verein für Socialpolitik debate between the supporters and opponents of the idea that ethics was an important consideration in the field of economics. Weber's position was that the social sciences should strive to be value-free. In his view, science had no part in choosing values. With regards to economics, he argued that productivity was not a useful scientific concept, as it could impede the proper evaluation of economic phenomena.

=== Methodological individualism ===
The principle of methodological individualism, which held that social scientists should seek to understand collectivities solely as the result of individual people's actions, originated with Weber. The term "methodological individualism" was coined in 1908 by the Austrian-American economist Joseph Schumpeter as a name for Weber's views on explaining social phenomena. While his research interests placed a strong emphasis on interpreting economic history, Weber's support of methodological individualism broke with the historical school of economics and aligned with the Austrian school of economics' founder, Carl Menger, in the Methodenstreit. In the first chapter of Economy and Society, Weber argued that only individuals "can be treated as agents in a course of subjectively understandable action". Despite the term's usage of "individualism", he did not interpret the individual as being the true source for sociological explanations. Instead, while only individuals could engage in intentional action, they were not necessarily separate from the collective group. Weber thought that methodological individualism had a close proximity to verstehende (interpretive) sociology, as actions could be interpreted subjectively. Similarly, it was also related to ideal types in that it involved discussions of abstract and rational models of human behaviour.

=== Ideal type ===
The ideal type was a central concept in Weber's methodology. He argued that they were indispensable for the social sciences. Due to taking of meaning into account, they were unique to the social sciences. An ideal type was a schematic that represented a social action and considered the role of meaning in it. It was an exaggeration of an empirical situation through its assumption that the involved individuals were rational, had complete situational knowledge, were completely aware of the situation, were completely aware of their actions, and made no errors. This was then contrasted with empirical reality, allowing the researcher to better understand it. However, ideal types were not direct representations of reality and Weber warned against interpreting them as such. The ideal types' three functions were to formulate terminology, classifications, and hypotheses. The latter task was the most important one. He placed no limits on what ideal types could be used to analyse. Since he thought that rational methodology and science were synonymous, ideal types were constructed rationally. The term "ideal type" was derived from Georg Jellinek. Weber outlined it in "The 'Objectivity' of Knowledge in Social Science and Social Policy" and the first chapter of Economy and Society.

=== Value-freedom ===
Weber thought that social scientists needed to avoid making value-judgements. Instead, social scientific research needed to be value-free. This would give scientists objectivity but must combine with an acknowledgement that their research connected with values in different ways. As part of his support for value-freedom, Weber opposed both instructors and students promoting their political views in the classroom. He first articulated it in his scientific philosophy writings, including "The 'Objectivity' of Knowledge in Social Science and Social Policy" and "Science as a Vocation". Weber was influenced by Heinrich Rickert's concept of value-relevance. Rickert used it to relate historical objects to values while maintaining objectivity through explicitly defined conceptual distinctions. However, Weber disagreed with the idea that a scholar could maintain objectivity while ascribing to a hierarchy of values in the way that Rickert did, however. His argument regarding value-freedom was connected to his involvement in the Werturteilsstreit. During it, he argued that the social sciences needed to be value-free. Meanwhile, he unsuccessfully tried to turn the German Sociological Association into a value-free organisation.

== Theories ==
=== Rationalisation ===
Rationalisation was a central theme in Weber's scholarship. This theme was situated in the larger context of the relationship between psychological motivations, cultural values, cultural beliefs, and societal structure. Weber understood rationalisation as having resulted in increasing knowledge, growing impersonality, and the enhanced control of social and material life. He was ambivalent towards it. Weber admitted that it was responsible for many advances, particularly freeing humans from traditional, restrictive, and illogical social guidelines. However, he also criticised it for dehumanising individuals and curtailing their freedom, trapping them in the rational and bureaucratic iron cage. His studies of it began with The Protestant Ethic and the Spirit of Capitalism. In it, he argued that Protestantism's – particularly Calvinism's – redefinition of work and piety's connection caused a shift towards rational attempts to achieve economic gain. In Protestantism, piety was expressed through one's secular vocation. The religious principles that influenced capitalism's creation became unnecessary and it became able to propagate itself without them.

What Weber depicted was not only the secularisation of Western culture, but also and especially the development of modern societies from the viewpoint of rationalisation. The new structures of society were marked by the differentiation of the two functionally intermeshing systems that had taken shape around the organisational cores of the capitalist enterprise and the bureaucratic state apparatus. Weber understood this process as the institutionalisation of purposive-rational economic and administrative action. To the degree that everyday life was affected by this cultural and societal rationalisation, traditional forms of life – which in the early modern period were differentiated primarily according to one's trade – were dissolved.

— Jürgen Habermas in The Philosophical Discourse of Modernity: Twelve Lectures, 1990.

Weber continued his investigation into rationalisation in later works, notably in his studies on bureaucracy and the classification of legitimate authority into three ideal types – rational-legal, traditional, and charismatic – of which rational-legal was the dominant one in modernity. In these works, Weber described what he saw as society's movement towards rationalisation. Bureaucratic states justified themselves through their own rationality and were supported by expert knowledge which made them rational. Rationalisation could also be seen in the economy, with the development of a highly rational capitalism. Capitalism's rationality related to its basis in economic calculation, particularly double-entry bookkeeping, which separated it from alternative forms of economic organisation. State bureaucracy and capitalism served as the twin pillars of the developing rational society. These changes eliminated the preexisting traditions that relied on the trades. Weber also saw rationalisation as one of the main factors that set the West apart from the rest of the world. Furthermore, The Rational and Social Foundations of Music was his application of rationalisation to music. It was influenced by his affair with the pianist Mina Tobler and a sense that Western music was the only type that had become harmonic, while other cultures' music was more intense and focused on hearing. Weber argued that music was becoming increasingly rational. In his view, that resulted from new developments in musical instrument construction and simultaneous socio-economic shifts of the different instruments' players.

=== Disenchantment ===
The process of disenchantment progressively removed magic as a central part of people's interpretation of the world. Older explanations of events relied on a belief in supernatural interference in the material world. According to Weber, religious activity began with material world actions that were given magical meanings and associated with vague spirits. Over time, this became increasingly systemised and the spirits became gods, resulting in polytheism and organised religion. Increasing rationality caused Western monotheism to develop, and groups focused on specific gods for political and economic purposes, creating a universal religion. Protestantism encouraged an increased pursuit of rationality that led to its own devaluation. It was replaced by modern science, which was considered a valid alternative to religious belief. However, modern science also ceased to be a source for universal values, as it could not create values. In its place was a collection of different value systems that could not adequately replace it. This mirrored the previous state of Western polytheism, but differed from it in that its gods lacked their ancient predecessors' mystical qualities.

=== The Protestant Ethic and the Spirit of Capitalism ===
The development of the concept of the calling quickly gave to the modern entrepreneur a fabulously clear conscience – and also industrious workers; he gave to his employees as the wages of their ascetic devotion to the calling and of co-operation in his ruthless exploitation of them through capitalism the prospect of eternal salvation.

— Max Weber in The Protestant Ethic and the Spirit of Capitalism, 1905.

The Protestant Ethic and the Spirit of Capitalism is Weber's most famous work. It was his first work on how religions affected economic systems' development. In the book, he put forward the thesis that the Protestant work ethic, which was derived from the theological ideas of the Reformation, influenced capitalism's development. Weber looked for elective affinities between the Protestant work ethic and capitalism. He may have derived "elective affinity" from one of Johann Wolfgang von Goethe's works. Weber argued that the Puritans' religious calling to work caused them to systematically obtain wealth. They wished to prove that they were predestined to go to Heaven. Weber used Benjamin Franklin's personal ethic, as described in his "Advice to a Young Tradesman", as an example of the Protestant sects' economic ethic. Concepts that later became central to his scholarship, including rationalisation and the ideal type, appeared in the text.

According to Weber, certain types of Protestantism – notably Calvinism – were supportive of the rational pursuit of economic gain and the worldly activities that were dedicated to it, seeing those activities as having been endowed with moral and spiritual significance. The spirit of capitalism was found in the desire to work hard in a way that pleased the worker and signified their worth and originally had a basis in theology. In particular, the Protestant work ethic motivated the believers to work hard, be successful in business, and reinvest their profits in further development rather than frivolous pleasures. Weber thought that self-restraint, hard work, and a belief that wealth could be a sign of salvation were representative of ascetic Protestantism. Ascetic Protestants practiced inner-worldly asceticism and sought to change the world to better reflect their beliefs. The notion of a religious calling, when combined with predestination, meant that each individual had to take action to prove their salvation to themselves. However, the success that these religious principles created ultimately removed them as an influence on modern capitalism through their creation of a worldly perspective. As a result, rationalisation entrapped that system's inheritors in a socio-economic iron cage.

=== The Economic Ethics of the World Religions ===
Weber's work in the field of sociology of religion began with the book The Protestant Ethic and the Spirit of Capitalism. It continued with The Economic Ethics of the World Religions book series, which contained The Religion of China, The Religion of India, and Ancient Judaism. Intended later studies of Christianity, Talmudic Judaism, and Islam were left unwritten. The books' three main themes were: religious ideas' effect on economic activities, the relationship between social stratification and religious ideas, and the distinguishable characteristics of Western civilisation. Weber's goal was to explain the Western world and the Eastern world's different developmental paths and the distinctive elements of Western civilisation. Weber also proposed a socio-evolutionary model of religious change where societies moved from magic to ethical monotheism, with the intermediatory steps of polytheism, pantheism, and monotheism. According to him, this resulted from growing economic stability, allowing for professionalisation and the evolution of an increasingly sophisticated priesthood. As societies grew more complex and encompassed different groups, a hierarchy of gods developed. Meanwhile, as their power became more centralised, the concept of a universal God became more popular and desirable.

==== The Religion of China ====
In The Religion of China: Confucianism and Taoism, Weber focused on the aspects of Chinese society that differed from those of Western Europe, especially ones that contrasted with Puritanism. As part of that, he questioned why capitalism had not developed in China. He focused on the issues of Chinese urban development, Chinese patrimonialism and officialdom and Chinese religion and philosophy – primarily Confucianism and Taoism – as the areas in which Chinese significantly differed from European development. According to Weber, Confucianism and Puritanism were superficially similar, but were actually very different from one another. Instead, they were mutually exclusive types of rational thought, each attempting to prescribe a way of life based on religious dogma. Notably, they both valued self-control and restraint and did not oppose wealth accumulation. However, both of those qualities were simply means to different final goals. Confucianism's goal was "a cultured status position", while Puritanism's goal was to make individuals "tools of God". According to Weber, the Puritans sought rational control of the world and rejected its irrationality while Confucians sought rational acceptance of that state of affairs. Therefore, he stated that the difference in social attitudes and mentality, shaped by the respective dominant religions, contributed to the development of capitalism in the West and the absence of it in China.

==== The Religion of India ====
In The Religion of India: The Sociology of Hinduism and Buddhism, Weber dealt with Indian society's structure and what he interpreted as the orthodox doctrines of Hinduism and the heterodox doctrines of Buddhism and Jainism. In Weber's view, Hinduism in India, like Confucianism in China, was a barrier for capitalism. The Indian caste system, which developed in post-Classical India and served as the source for legitimate social interactions, served as a key part of that. Both Hinduism and the Brahmins' high status upheld the caste system. The Brahmins used their monopoly on education and theological authority to maintain their position. Meanwhile, Hinduism created a psychological justification for it through the cycle of reincarnation. In it, a person's caste position was determined by one's past life actions. As a result, soul advancement and obeying the predetermined order were more important than seeking material world advancement, including economic advancement.

Weber ended his research of Indian society and religion by using insights from his previous work on China to discuss the similarities of the Asian belief systems. He noted that these religions' believers used otherworldly mystical experiences to interpret life's meaning. The social world was fundamentally divided between the educated elite who followed the guidance of a prophet or wise man and the uneducated masses whose beliefs were centered on magic. In Asia, there were no messianic prophecies to give both educated and uneducated followers meaning in their regular lives. Weber juxtaposed such Messianic prophecies, notably from the Near East, with the exemplary prophecies found in mainland Asia that focused more on reaching to the educated elites and enlightening them on the proper ways to live one's life, usually with little emphasis on hard work and the material world. It was those differences that prevented Western countries from following the paths of the earlier Chinese and Indian civilisations. His next work, Ancient Judaism, was an attempt to prove this theory.

==== Ancient Judaism ====
In Ancient Judaism, Weber attempted to explain the factors that resulted in the early differences between Eastern and Western religiosity. He contrasted the inner-worldly asceticism developed by Western Christianity with the mystical contemplation that developed in India. Weber noted that some aspects of Christianity sought to conquer and change the world, rather than withdraw from its imperfections. This fundamental characteristic of Christianity originally stemmed from ancient Jewish prophecy. Weber classified the Jewish people as having been a pariah people, meaning that they were separated from the society that contained them. He examined the ancient Jewish people's origins and social structures. In his view, the Israelites maintained order through a covenant with the war god Yahweh and the practice of warrior asceticism. Under Solomon, that changed into a more organised and law-based society than the old confederation was. Religiously, the priests replaced the previous charismatic religious leaders. Weber thought that Elijah was the first prophet to have risen from the shepherds. Elijah promulgated political prophecies and opposed the monarchy.

=== Theodicy ===
Weber used the concept of theodicy in his interpretation of theology and religion throughout his corpus. This involved both his scholarly and personal interests in the subject. It was central to his conception of humanity, which he interpreted as being connected with finding meaning. Weber's personal perspective on religion was that he was "unmusical religiously", but "neither antireligious nor irreligious". Theodicy was a popular subject of study amongst German scholars who sought to determine how a world created by an omnibenevolent and omnipotent being can contain suffering. As part of this tradition, Weber was careful in his study of the subject. Rather than interpreting it through a theological or ethical lens, he interpreted it through a social one. Furthermore, he incorporated Friedrich Nietzsche's concept of ressentiment into his discussion of the topic. However, Weber disagreed with Nietzsche's emotional discussion of ressentiment and his interpretation of it as a Judaism-derived expression of slave morality. Weber divided theodicy into dualism, the belief that a Manichean divine struggle caused misfortune; karma, the belief that misfortune was karmic; and predestination, the belief that only a chosen few will be saved from damnation.

Weber defined the importance of societal class within religion by examining the difference between the theodicies of fortune and misfortune and to what class structures they apply. The theodicy of fortune related to successful people's desire to prove that they deserved it. They were also prone to not being satisfied with what they already had and wished to avoid the notion that they were illegitimate or sinful. Those who were unsuccessful in life believed in the theodicy of misfortune, believing wealth and happiness would later be divinely granted to those who deserved it. Another example of how this belief of religious theodicy influenced class was that those of lower economic status tended towards deep religiousness and faith as a way to comfort themselves and provide hope for a more prosperous future, while those of higher economic status preferred the sacraments or actions that proved their right to possess greater wealth.

=== The state, politics, and government ===
Weber defined the state as an entity that had a monopoly on the legitimate use of force within a given area. This meant that the state could legitimately use force to preserve itself within a given area. He also proposed that politics was the sharing of state power and influencing the distribution thereof between states and between groups within a state. Weber's definition of a politician required that they have passion, judgement, and responsibility. He divided action into the oppositional gesinnungsethik and verantwortungsethik (the "ethic of ultimate ends" and the "ethic of responsibility"). A verantwortungsethik adherent justified their actions through their consequences. Meanwhile, a gesinnungsethik adherent justified their actions through their ideals. While Weber thought that an ideal politician possessed both of them, he associated them with different types of people and mindsets. Combining them required that a politician be passionate about their goals and pragmatic about achieving them.

In his view, all authority-based relationships could be classified according to his tripartite classification of authority. Charismatic authority was held by individuals who held power through their charisma, meaning that their power originated from extraordinary personal qualities. It was unstable, as it resisted institutionalisation and relied on the leader's success. Over time, it was forced to be routinised into more structured forms of authority. The charismatic leader's followers would create an administrative structure. Traditional authority was based on loyalty to preestablished traditions and those who held authority as a result of those traditions. For Weber, patriarchalism – the rule by a patriarch over a family – was the most important variety of traditional authority. Patrimonialism – a closely related concept to patriarchalism – was a type of traditional authority where rulers treated the government and military as extensions of their households. Rational-legal authority relied on bureaucracy and belief in both the legality of the society's rules and the legitimacy of those who held power as a result of those rules. Unlike the other types of authority, it developed gradually. That was the result of legal systems ability to exist without charismatic individuals or traditions. In The City, a portion of Economy and Society on the European city's development in antiquity and the Middle Ages, Weber argued that a unique form of non-legitimate domination arose in medieval European cities that successfully challenged the forms of legitimate domination that had previously prevailed in the medieval world. These cities were previously under several different entities' jurisdiction that was removed as they became autonomous. That was caused by newer cities being granted privileges and the usurpation of authority in older ones.

==== Bureaucracy ====
Weber's commentary on societal bureaucratisation is one of the most prominent parts of his work. According to him, bureaucracy was the most efficient societal organisation method and the most formally rational system. It was necessary for modern society to function and would be difficult to destroy. Bureaucratic officials felt superior to non-bureaucrats, had a strong sense of duty, and had fixed salaries that disinclined them to pursue monetary acquisition. Bureaucracy was less likely to be found among elected officials. It was also a requirement for both modern capitalism and modern socialism to exist. Furthermore, Bureaucracy's impersonal treatment of all people suited capitalism well. This depersonalisation related to its increased efficiency. Bureaucrats could not openly make arbitrary decisions or base them on personal favours. As the most efficient and rational way of organising, bureaucratisation was the key part of rational-legal authority. Furthermore, he saw it as the key process in the ongoing rationalisation of Western society.

Weber's ideal type of bureaucracy was characterised by hierarchical organisation, delineated lines of authority in a fixed area of activity, action taken on the basis of written rules, bureaucratic officials needing expert training, rules being implemented neutrally, and career advancement depending on organisation-judged technical qualifications. The development of communication and transportation technologies made more efficient administration possible and popularly requested. Meanwhile, the democratisation and rationalisation of culture resulted in demands that the new system treat everyone equally. In describing bureaucracy's history, Weber discussed multiple civilisations and said that the Egyptian New Kingdom's bureaucracy was the historical model for all later ones. While arguing that bureaucracy was the most efficient form of organisation and was indispensable for the modern state, Weber was also critical of it. In his view, an inescapable bureaucratisation of society would happen in the future. He also thought that a hypothetical victory of socialism over capitalism would have not prevented that. Economic and political organisations needed entrepreneurs and politicians in order to counteract bureaucrats. Otherwise, they would be stifled by bureaucracy.

==== Social stratification ====
Weber also formulated a three-component theory of stratification containing the elements of class, status, and party. Class was based on an economically determined relationship with the market, status (Stand) was based on non-economic qualities such as honour and prestige, and party was based on political affiliations. This distinction was most clearly described in his essay "The Distribution of Power Within the Gemeinschaft: Classes, Stände, Parties", which was first published in his book Economy and Society. Status served as one of the central ways of societal ranking. Issues of honour and prestige were important to it. With regards to class, the theory placed heavy emphasis on class conflict and private property in its definition. While Weber drew upon Marx's interpretation of class conflict in his definition of class, he did not see it as defining all social relations and stratification. Political parties were not given as much attention by Weber as the other two components were, as he thought that their actions were not particularly effectual. Their purpose was to seek power to benefit their members materially or ideologically.

Weber's concept of status emerged from his farm labour and the stock exchange studies, as he found social relationships that were unexplainable through economic class alone. The Junkers had social rules regarding marriage between different social levels and farm labourers had a strong sense of independence, neither of which was economically based. Weber maintained a sharp distinction between the terms "status" and "class", although non-scholars tend to use them interchangeably in casual use. Status and its focus on honour emerged from the Gemeinschaft, which denoted the part of society where loyalty originated from. Class emerged from the Gesellschaft, a subdivision of the Gemeinschaft that included rationally driven markets and legal organisations. Parties emerged from a combination of the two. Weber interpreted life chances, the opportunities to improve one's life, as a definitional aspect of class. They related to the differences in access to opportunities that individuals might have had in their lives. The relationship between status and class was not straightforward. One of them could lead to the other, and an individual or group could succeed in one but not the other.

=== The vocation lectures ===
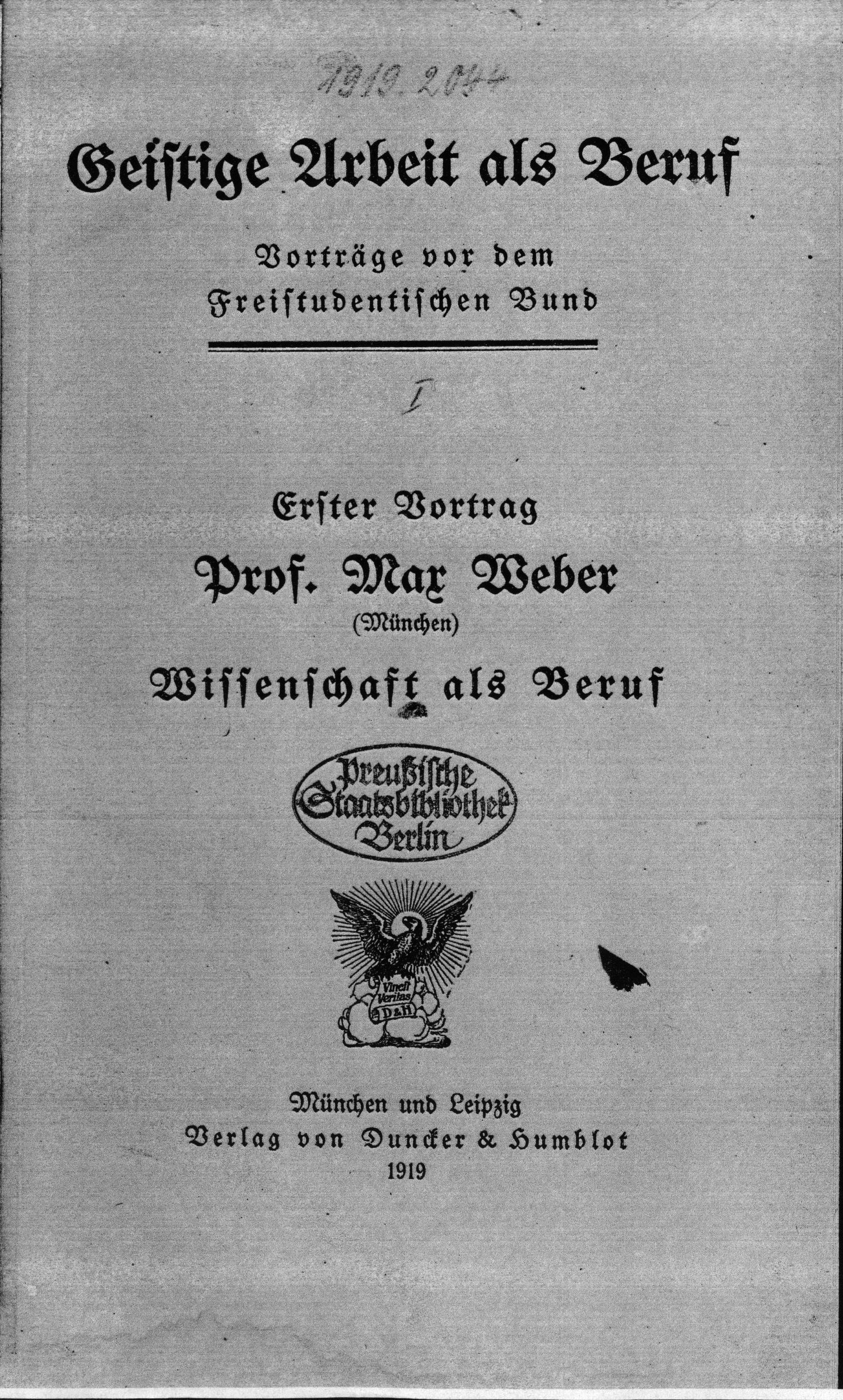
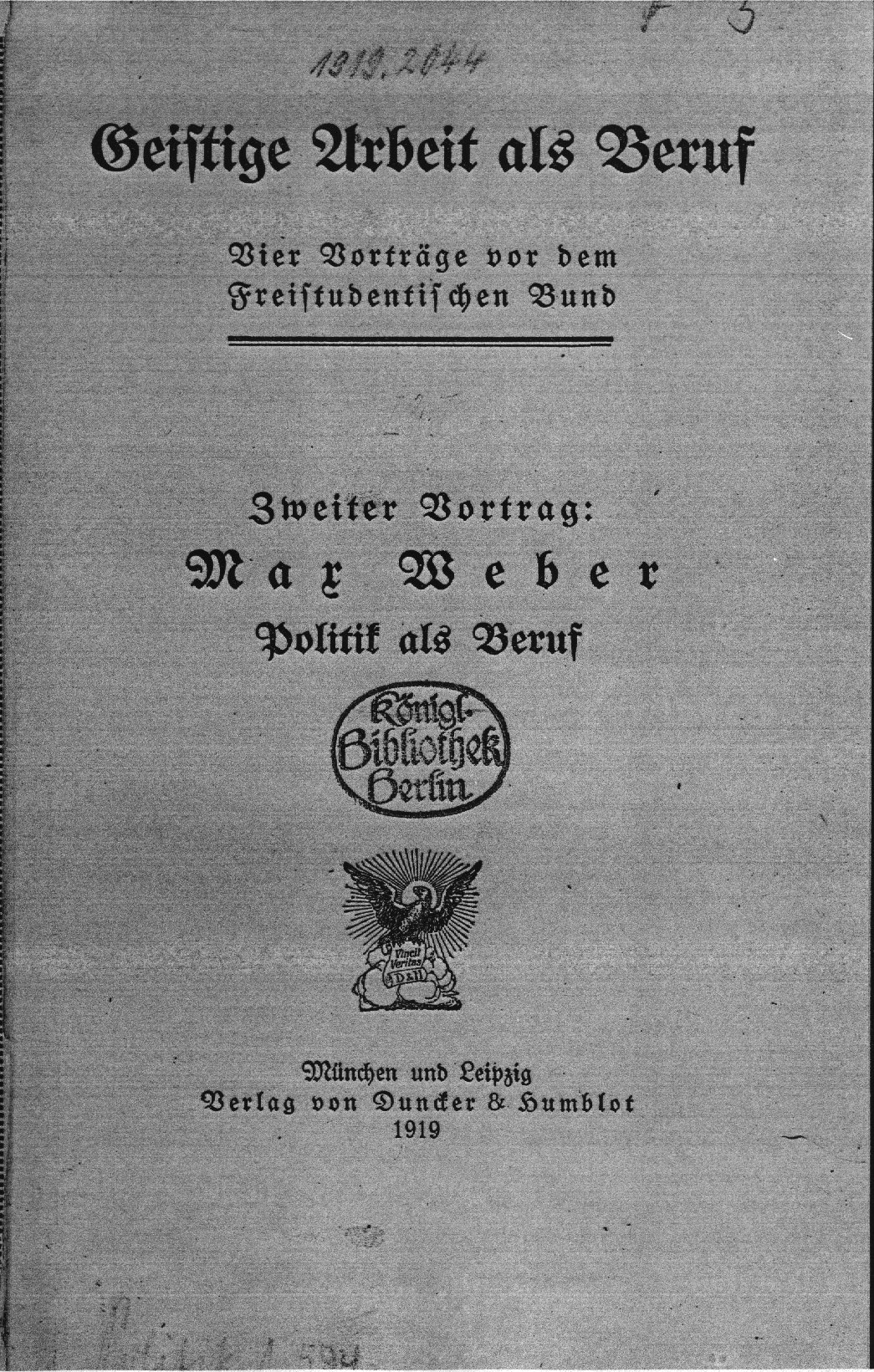
1919 title pages of "Science as a Vocation" and "Politics as a Vocation"

Towards the end of his life, Weber gave two lectures, "Science as a Vocation" and "Politics as a Vocation", at LMU Munich on the subjects of the scientific and political vocations. The Free Student Youth, a left-liberal student organisation, had their spokesperson, Immanuel Birnbaum, invite him to give the lectures. In "Science as a Vocation", he argued that a scholar needed to possess an inner calling. Weber thought that only a particular type of person could be an academic, stating that the path forward in scholarship required the scholar to be methodical in their research and understand that they might not succeed. Specialisation was also an aspect of modern scholarship that a scholar needed to engage in. Disenchantment and intellectual rationalisation were major aspects of his commentary on the scholar's role in modernity. They resulted in scholarship's value being questioned. Weber argued that scholarship could provide certainty through its starting presumptions, despite its inability to give absolute answers. Meanwhile, "Politics as a Vocation" commented on the subject of politics. Weber was responding to the early Weimar Republic's political instability. He argued that politicians had passion, judgement, and responsibility. There was also a division between conviction and responsibility. While these two concepts were sharply divided, it was possible for single individual – particularly the ideal politician – to possess both of them. He also divided legitimate authority into the three categories of traditional, charismatic, and rational-legal authority. Towards the lecture's end, he described politics as "a slow, powerful drilling through hard boards". Ultimately, Weber thought that the political issues of his day required consistent effort to resolve, rather than the quick solutions that the students preferred.

=== Law ===
Max Weber was a founder of sociology of law and was trained in law and legal history. According to Weber, law went through four developmental phases: law prophet-derived charismatic legal revelation, Honoratioren making and applying law, religious or secular powers imposing law, and trained legal professionals systematically expanding and administering law. Law prophets were charismatic authorities who created new laws consciously through their charisma. Meanwhile, Honoratioren were people who had high enough statuses to be respected in their communities while simultaneously having high enough class positions to be economically able to devote their full attention to politics. Weber argued that lawmaking as law creation and law-finding as the contextual application of such laws were complimentary. Both were potentially irrational or rational and formal or substantive. In terms of sociology of law, Weber argued that it was different than jurisprudence in that the former sought to understand the effects that legal rules had on social behaviour, while the latter sought to understand the rules' internal logic. He also argued that modern law was defined by legal norms' that were divided between prescriptive or prohibitory claims and permissive privileges. Claims made the keeping of promises more certain, and privileges facilitated the creation of new laws. For Weber, law was a group of conventions that were staff-enforced. He considered legal systems' development to have been indispensable for modern capitalism's own development.

=== Economics ===
Weber primarily considered himself an economist, and all of his professorial appointments were in economics, but his contributions to that field were largely overshadowed by his role as a founder of modern sociology. He was a founder of economic sociology. He described capitalism as an economic system where individuals used property as an object of trade for profit-making enterprises in a market economy and divided it into multiple categories. Political capitalism was an ancient form of capitalism where the state created opportunities for profit-making, while rational capitalism was a modern Western form of capitalism that was defined by rationality and its orientation towards markets. As a political economist and economic historian, Weber belonged to the German historical school of economics, represented by academics such as Gustav von Schmoller and Schmoller's student Werner Sombart. While Weber's research interests were largely in line with this school, his views on methodology and marginal utility significantly diverged from them. Instead, they were closer to those of Carl Menger and the Austrian school of economics, the historical school's traditional rivals. Unlike other historicists, Weber accepted marginal utility and taught it to his students. In 1908, Weber published an article, "Marginal Utility Theory and 'The Fundamental Law of Psychophysics'", arguing that marginal utility and economics were not based on psychophysics. In general, Weber disagreed with the idea that economics relied on another field. The division caused by the Methodenstreit caused Weber to support a broad interpretation of economics that combined economic theory, economic history, and economic sociology in the form of Sozialökonomik (social economics).

=== Economy and Society ===
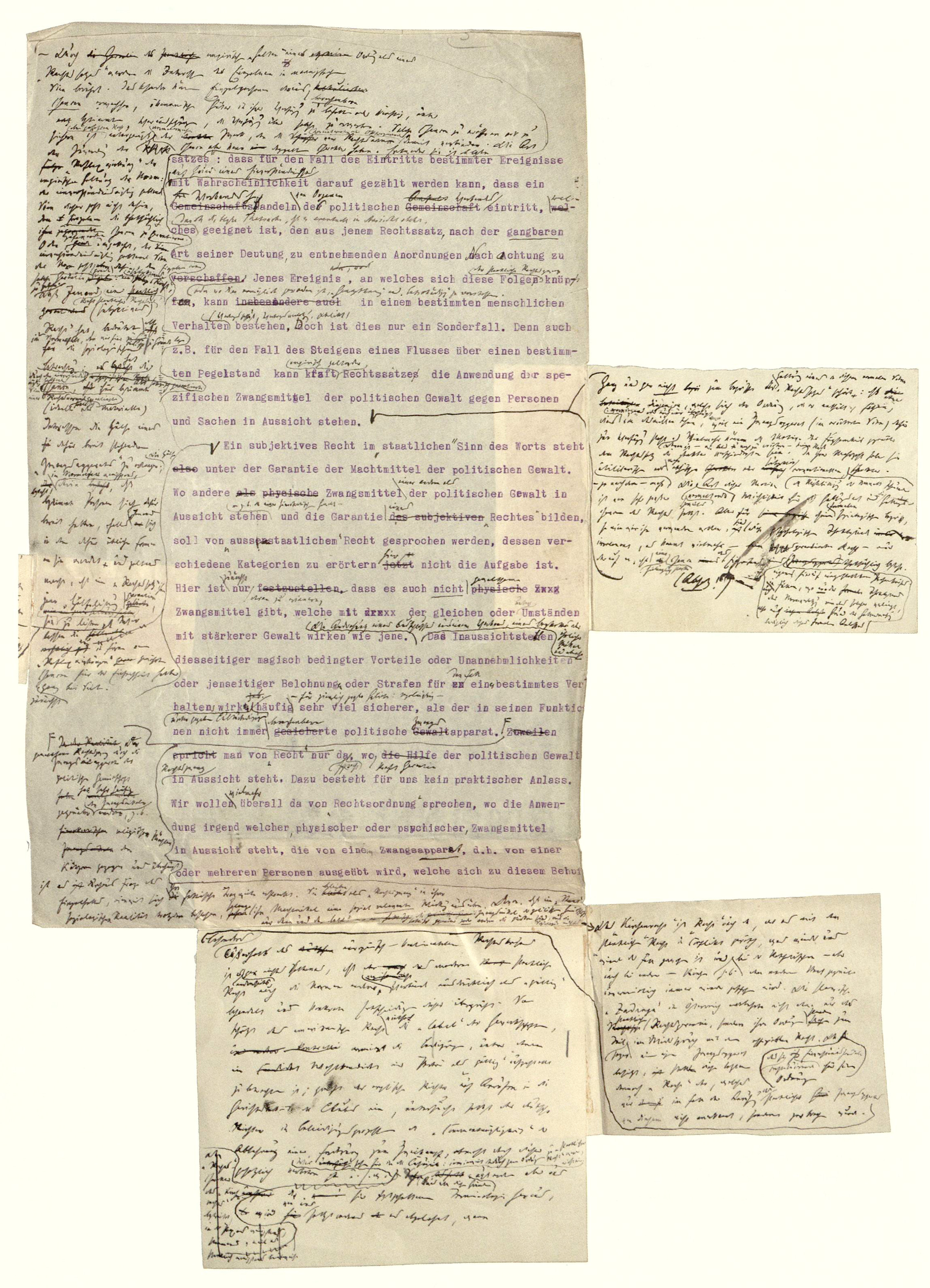
A page from the manuscript of the sociology of law within Economy and Society

Weber's magnum opus Economy and Society is an essay collection that he was working on at the time of his death in 1920. It included a wide range of essays dealing with Weber's views regarding sociology, social philosophy, politics, social stratification, world religion, diplomacy, and other subjects. The text was largely unfinished, outside of the first three chapters. These chapters were written between 1919 and 1920. They relate to verstehende sociology, economic sociology, authority, and class and status groups, respectively. The first chapter is one of the two most frequently consulted portions of the text by Weberian scholars – alongside the third chapter – and moved from a discussion of individuals' social actions to the centrality of the monopoly on violence to the state. Meanwhile, the second chapter is less discussed, as it represented a type of economic theory that had fallen out of style amongst economists after the 1930s. It presented an analytical economic history that contained a discussion of the origins of capitalism and argued that the Austrian and historical schools of economics could be methodologically synthesised. Chapter three focused on Weber's tripartite definition of legitimate authority. Since the final chapter was unfinished, it was largely a brief set of classifications of classes and Stände (statuses).

After Weber's death, the final organisation and editing of the book fell to his widow Marianne. She was assisted by the economist Melchior Palyi. The resulting volume was published in four volumes from February 1921 to September 1922 and was titled Wirtschaft und Gesellschaft. It also included additional texts that were generally written between 1909 and 1914 that his widow found amongst his belongings. In 1956, the German jurist Johannes Winckelmann edited and organised a revised fourth edition of Economy and Society, later editing a fifth edition in 1976. Guenther Roth and Claus Wittich edited an English translation of the work in 1968. It was based on a 1964 revised edition of Winckelmann's version of the text. The Max Weber-Gesamtausgabe editors published Economy and Society in six parts, with the first devoted to the first four chapters thereof. The remaining five parts were organised in chronological order based on when they were written. In 2019, Keith Tribe published a revised English translation of the Max Weber-Gesamtausgabe edition of its first four chapters.

== Inspirations ==
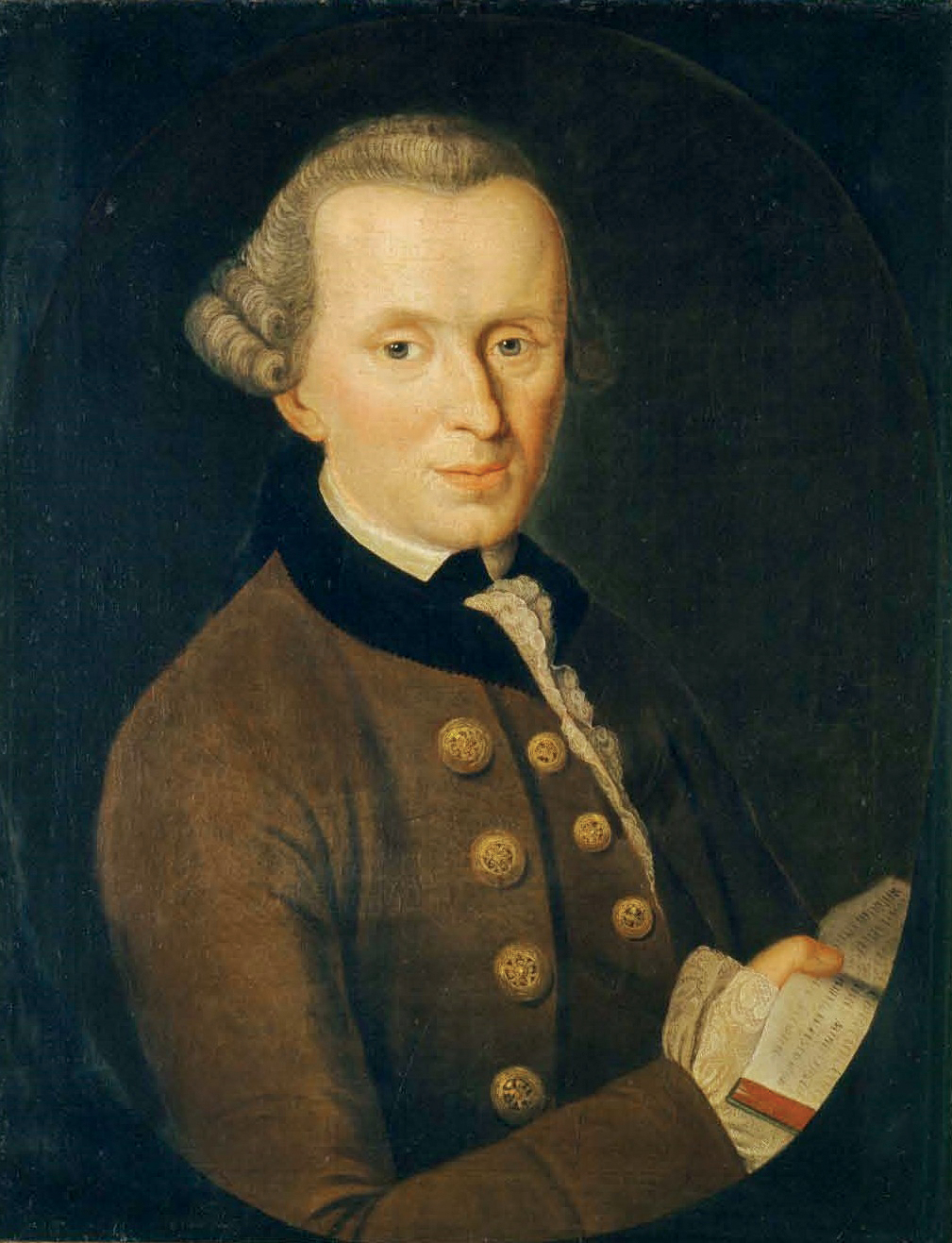
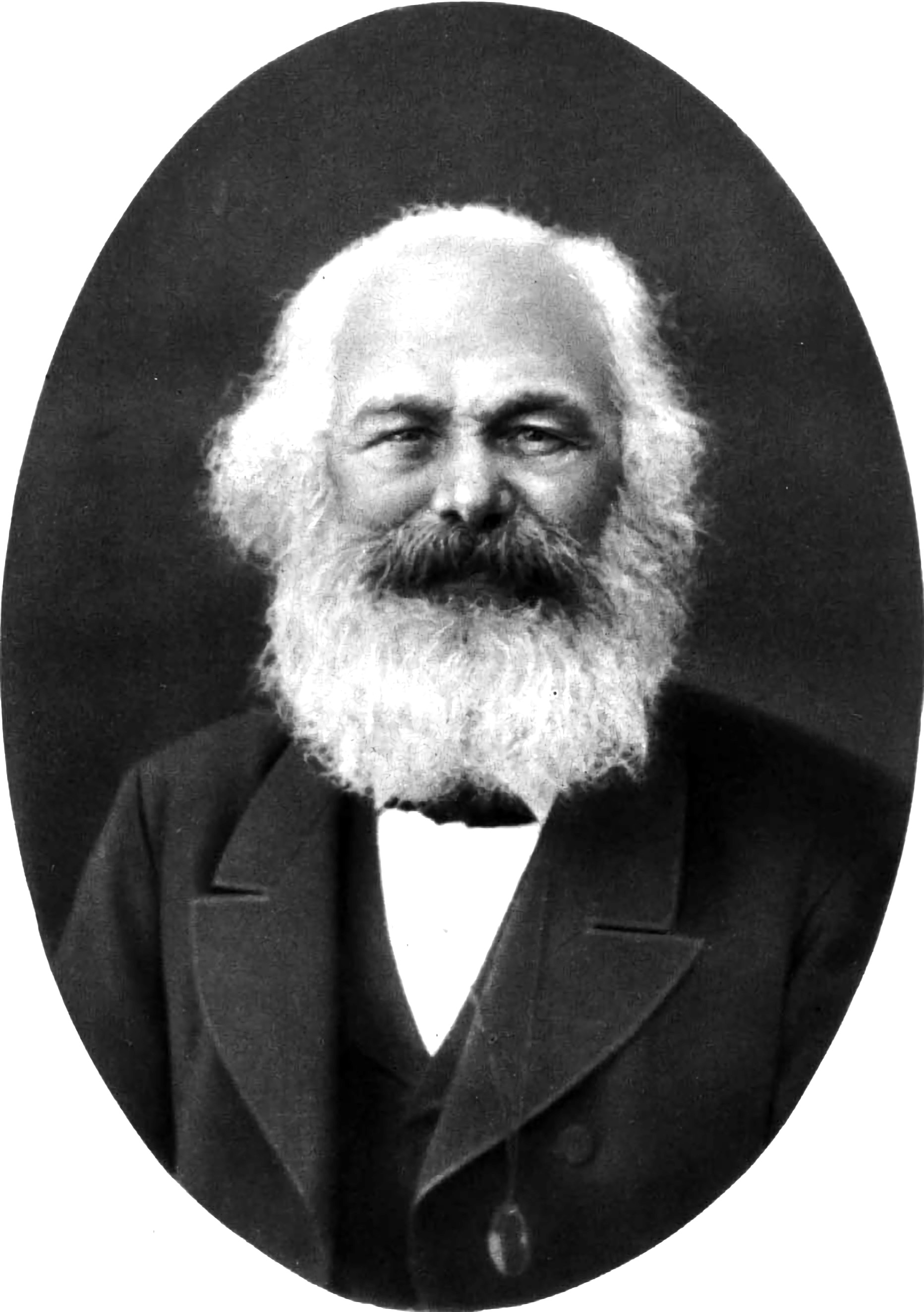
Immanuel Kant and Karl Marx, two of Max Weber's influences

Weber was strongly influenced by German idealism, particularly the neo-Kantianism of the Southwestern School. Heinrich Rickert and Wilhelm Windelband were significant figures in this school. He understood Immanuel Kant through moral psychology and philosophical anthropology. Weber's methodology and ethics were also influenced by him. In terms of methodology, he used the neo-Kantian conceptual framework to articulate his own concepts. Weber was also influenced by Kantian ethics in that he ascribed to the categorical imperative and sought non-arbitrary freedom. However, he considered Kantian ethics to be obsolete in a modern age without religious certainties. His responses to the questions posed by Kant and neo-Kantianism were pessimistic as a result.

Weber was responding to Friedrich Nietzsche's philosophy's effect on modern thought. His goal in the field of ethics was to find non-arbitrarily defined freedom in what he interpreted as a post-metaphysical age, representing a division between the Kantian and Nietzschean parts of his thought. After his 1920 debate with Oswald Spengler, Weber said that the world was significantly intellectually influenced by Nietzsche and Marx. In The Protestant Work Ethic and the Spirit of Capitalism and "Science as a Vocation", Weber negatively described and warned about "die 'letzten Menschen'" ("the 'last men'"), who were Nietzschean "specialists without spirit". He also used Nietzsche's concept of ressentiment in his discussion of theodicy, but disliked Nietzsche's emotional approach to it and did not interpret it as Judaism-derived slave morality.

Karl Marx's writings were also a major influence on Weber's works. While Weber agreed with Marx on social conflict's importance, he did not think that a society would be destroyed if the traditions that upheld it were valued more than it was. Furthermore, he thought that a social conflict could be resolved within the preexisting social system. Writing in 1932, Karl Löwith contrasted Marx and Weber, arguing that both were interested in Western capitalism's causes and effects, but viewed it through different lenses. Marx interpreted it through alienation, while Weber interpreted it through rationalisation. Weber also expanded Marx's alienation theory from workers who were alienated from their work to similar situations involving intellectuals and bureaucrats. Cold War era scholars frequently interpreted Weber as "a bourgeois answer to Marx", but he was instead responding the Wilhelmine bourgeoisie's issues. In that regard, he focused on rationality and irrationality's conflict.

== Legacy ==
Alongside Karl Marx and Émile Durkheim, Weber is commonly regarded as one of modern sociology's founders. He was instrumental in developing an antipositivist, hermeneutic, tradition in the social sciences. Weber influenced many scholars across the political spectrum. Left-leaning social theorists – such as Theodor W. Adorno, Max Horkheimer, György Lukács, and Jürgen Habermas – were influenced by his discussion of modernity and its friction with modernisation. Furthermore, his analysis of modernity and rationalisation significantly influenced the Frankfurt School's critical theory. Right-leaning scholars – including Carl Schmitt, Joseph Schumpeter, Leo Strauss, Hans Morgenthau, and Raymond Aron – focused on his discussion of strong democratic leaders, political ethics' relationship with value-freedom and value-relativism, and combating bureaucracy through political action. The scholars who examined his works philosophically, including Strauss, Hans Henrik Bruun, and Alfred Schütz, traditionally looked at them through the lens of Continental philosophy.

=== Weber studies ===
Weberian scholarship's beginnings were delayed by the disruption of academic life in the Weimar Republic. Hyper-inflation caused Weber's support for parliamentary democracy to be countered by the declining respect that German professors had for it. Their political alienation caused many of them to become pessimistic and closer to the historical viewpoints espoused by Oswald Spengler in his The Decline of the West. Furthermore, universities were increasingly under state control and influence, which accelerated after the Nazi Party took power. The previously dominant style of sociology, that of Alfred Vierkandt and Leopold von Wiese, was largely replaced by a sociology that was dominated by Nazis. Hans Freyer and Othmar Spann were representative of that movement, while Werner Sombart began to support collectivism and Nazism. The Nazi Party's rise marginalised Weber's scholarship in the German academy. However, some Weberian scholars left Germany, with most of them settling in the United States and the United Kingdom.

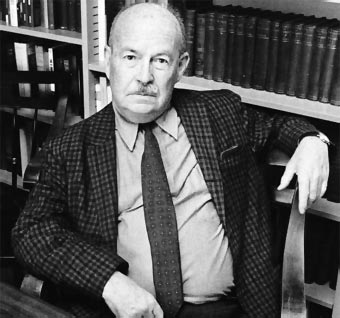
Talcott Parsons c. 1960

These scholars entered American and British academia when English translations of Weber's writings, such as the General Economic History, were beginning to be published. Talcott Parsons, an American scholar, was influenced by his readings of Weber and Sombart as a student in 1920s Germany. Marianne Weber gave him permission to publish a The Protestant Ethic and the Spirit of Capitalism translation in his 1930 essay collection, the Collected Essays on the Sociology of Religion. It was heavily edited by the publisher and was not initially successful. Nevertheless, it was part of Parsons's effort to create an academic sociology, which resulted in his 1937 book The Structure of Social Action. In it, Parsons argued that Weber and Durkheim were foundational sociologists. However, his book was not successful until after the Second World War. He translated Economy and Society as The Theory of Social and Economic Organization. Parsons's increasing scholarly prominence increased its influence. Other translations began to appear, including C. Wright Mills and Hans Gerth's From Max Weber: Essays in Sociology in 1946, which was a collection of excerpts from Weber's writings. In 1949, Edward Shils edited a translation of Weber's Collected Essays on Methodology, which was published as The Methodology of the Social Sciences.

As the 1940s ended, Weber's scholarly reputation rose due to scholarly interpretations of it through the lenses of Parsons's structural functionalism and Mills's conflict theory. Over the course of the following decades, continued translations of Weber's works began to appear, including ones on law, religion, music, and the city. Despite the translations' flaws, it became possible to obtain a largely complete view of Weber's scholarship. That was still impeded by the translations' unorganised publication, which prevented scholars from knowing the texts' connections. In 1968, a complete translation of Marianne Weber's prepared version of Economy and Society was published. While From Max Weber first forwarded an interpretation of Weber that was separate from Parson's structural functionalism, a more political and historical interpretation was forwarded by Reinhard Bendix's 1948 Max Weber: An Intellectual Portrait, Ralf Dahrendorf's 1957 Class and Conflict in an Industrial Society, and John Rex's 1962 Key Problems in Sociological Theory. Meanwhile, the 1964 centennial conference on Max Weber was held in Heidelberg. It featured a controversy over whether Weber's concept of charismatic authority played a role in Nazi Germany's rise. A year later, Raymond Aron's Main Currents in Sociological Thought gave an alternative to Parson's perspective on the history of sociology and framed Weber, Marx, and Durkheim as the three foundational figures. Anthony Giddens's 1971 Capitalism and Modern Social Theory solidified that interpretation. After the 1970s, more of Weber's less prominent publications were published. This coincided with the continued writing of critical commentaries on his works and ideas, including the creation of a scholarly journal in 2000 – Max Weber Studies – that is devoted to such scholarship. Additionally, the Max Weber Foundation was founded in 2002 as the managing body for the German Institutes of the Humanities. Weber's death centenary in 2020 provoked several scholarly conferences that were held online as a result of the COVID-19 pandemic.

=== Max Weber-Gesamtausgabe ===
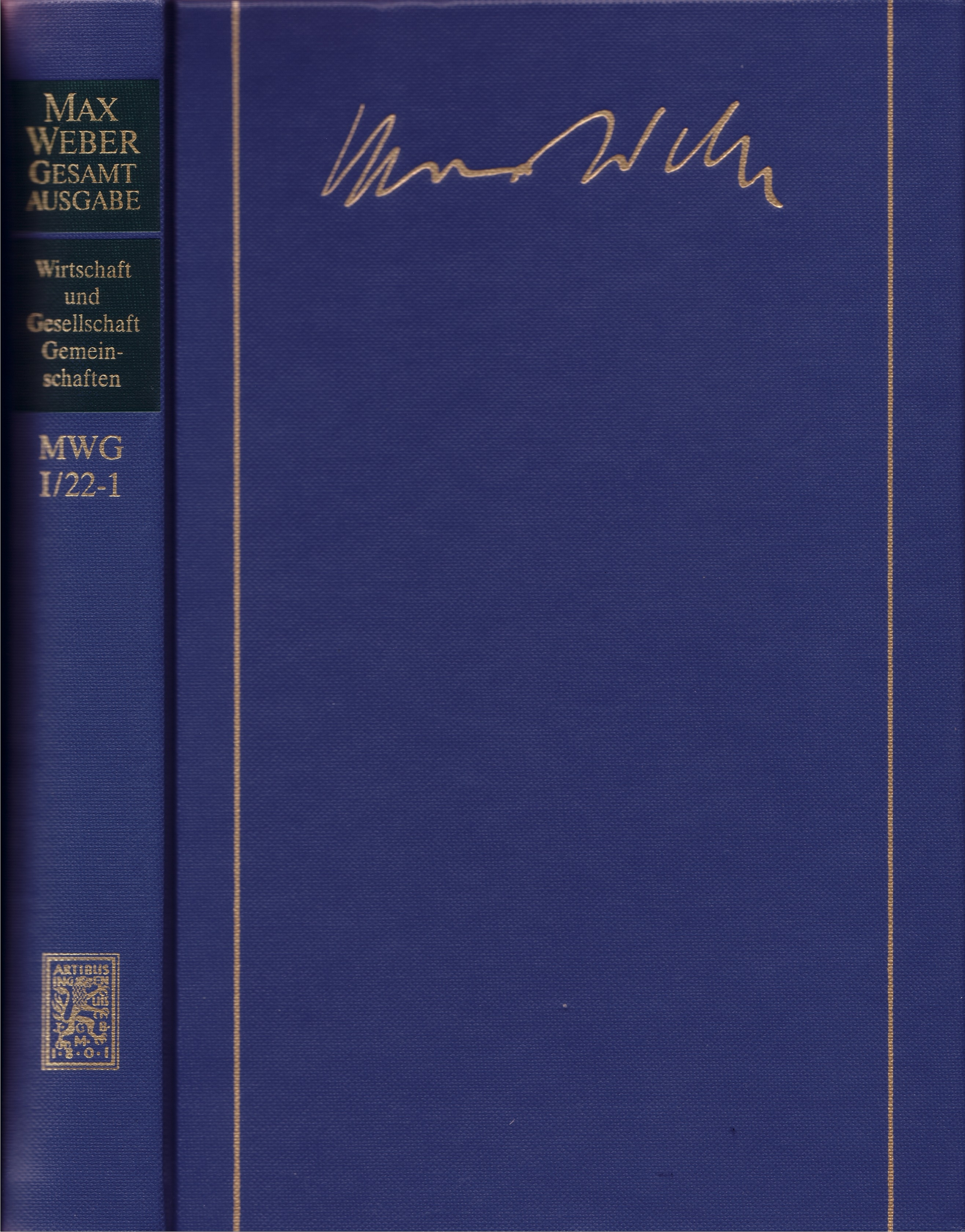
The cover of the first part of the twenty-second volume of the Max Weber-Gesamtausgabe

The idea of publishing a collected edition of Weber's complete works was pushed forward by Horst Baier in 1972. A year later, the Max Weber-Gesamtausgabe, a multi-volume set of all of his writings, began to take shape. Wolfgang J. Mommsen, Wolfgang Schluchter, Johannes Winckelmann, M. Rainer Lepsius, and Horst Baier were the initial editors. Mohr Siebeck was selected as the publisher. The project was presented to the academic community in 1981 with the publication of a prospectus that was colloquially referred to as the "green brochure". It outlined the series' three sections: "Writings and Speeches", "Letters", and "Lecture Manuscripts and Lecture Notes". Four years later, the project entered publication. The writings were organised in a combination of chronological order and by subject, with material that Weber did not intended for publication in purely chronological order. The final editions of each text were used, aside from The Protestant Ethic and the Spirit of Capitalism, which was included in both its originally published and revised forms. After Mommsen's death in 2004, Gangolf Hübinger succeeded him. Winckelmann, Lepsius, and Baier also died before its completion. It concluded in June 2020 and contains forty-seven volumes, including two index volumes.

== See also ==
- Max Weber scholars

== Sources ==
- Adair-Toteff, Christopher (January 2014). "Max Weber Gesamtausgabe: Interim Report and Future Volumes". Max Weber Studies. 14 (1): 113–118. doi:10.1353/max.2014.a808725. ISSN 1470-8078. JSTOR 24579954. S2CID 154801166. Project MUSE 808725.
- Adair-Toteff, Christopher (2022). "Max Weber's Economic Sociology". In Sica, Alan (ed.). The Routledge International Handbook on Max Weber. Routledge International Handbooks (First ed.). Abingdon-on-Thames: Routledge. pp. 277–287. doi:10.4324/9781003089537-26. ISBN 978-1-003-08953-7. OCLC 1346316238.
- Adair-Toteff, Christopher (January 2013). "'Sinn der Welt': Max Weber and the Problem of Theodicy". Max Weber Studies. 13 (1): 87–107. doi:10.1353/max.2013.a808748. ISSN 1470-8078. JSTOR 24579967. S2CID 170944520. Project MUSE 808748.
- Albrow, Martin (1990). Max Weber's Construction of Social Theory (First ed.). New York: St. Martin's Press. doi:10.1007/978-1-349-20879-1. ISBN 978-1-349-20879-1. OCLC 21195542. S2CID 140357530.
- Aldenhoff-Hübinger, Rita (July 2004). "Max Weber's Inaugural Address of 1895 in the Context of the Contemporary Debates in Political Economy". Max Weber Studies. 4 (2): 143–156. doi:10.15543/MWS/2004/2/3. ISSN 1470-8078. JSTOR 24579685. S2CID 62830925.
- Allan, Kenneth D. (2005). Explorations in Classical Sociological Theory: Seeing the Social World. Thousand Oaks, California: Pine Forge Press. ISBN 978-1-4129-0572-5. OCLC 1034668313.
- Baehr, Peter (2002). Founders, Classics, Canons: Modern Disputes over the Origins and Appraisal of Sociology's Heritage (First ed.). Abingdon-on-Thames: Routledge. doi:10.4324/9780203791615. ISBN 978-0-203-79161-5. OCLC 1306503294. S2CID 141719171.
- Baehr, Peter (2001). "The 'Iron Cage' and the 'Shell As Hard As Steel': Parsons, Weber, and the Stahlhartes Gehäuse Metaphor in The Protestant Ethic and the Spirit of Capitalism". History and Theory. 40 (2): 153–169. doi:10.1111/0018-2656.00160. ISSN 0018-2656. JSTOR 2678029. S2CID 170964674.
- Barker, Martin (June 1980). "Kant as a Problem for Weber". The British Journal of Sociology. 31 (2): 224–245. doi:10.2307/589689. ISSN 0007-1315. JSTOR 589689. S2CID 145073795.
- Beiser, Frederick C. (2011). "Max Weber and the End of the Historicist Tradition". The German Historicist Tradition. Oxford University Press. pp. 511–567. doi:10.1093/acprof:oso/9780199691555.003.0014. ISBN 978-0-19-969155-5. OCLC 751726167. S2CID 171232102.
- Bellah, Robert N. (June 1999). "Max Weber and World-Denying Love: A Look at the Historical Sociology of Religion". Journal of the American Academy of Religion. 67 (2): 277–304. doi:10.1093/jaarel/67.2.277. ISSN 0002-7189. JSTOR 1465738. S2CID 170701651. Archived from the original on 28 September 2021.
- Bendix, Reinhard; Roth, Guenther (1977). Max Weber: An Intellectual Portrait. Berkeley, California: University of California Press. ISBN 978-0-520-03194-4. OCLC 1150290821.
- Berman, Harold J.; Reid, Charles J. Jr. (2012). "Max Weber as Legal Historian". In Turner, Stephen (ed.). The Cambridge Companion to Weber. The Cambridge Companions to Philosophy and Religion (First ed.). Cambridge University Press. pp. 221–239. doi:10.1017/CCOL9780521561495.013. ISBN 978-0-521-56149-5. S2CID 171106362.
- Boehmer, Konrad (2001). "Weber, Max". In Sadie, Stanley; Tyrrell, John (eds.). The New Grove Dictionary of Music and Musicians. Vol. 27 (Second ed.). Oxford University Press. pp. 177–178. doi:10.1093/gmo/9781561592630.article.29991. ISBN 978-0-333-60800-5. OCLC 777335845.
- Bruhns, Hinnerk (December 2018). "Max Weber and the Problem of a 'Successful Peace'". Simmel Studies. 22 (2). Translated by Kirkbright, Suzanne: 35–70. doi:10.7202/1058557ar. ISSN 1616-2552. S2CID 186400299.
- Bruun, Hans Henrik (March 2010). "The Incompatibility of Values and the Importance of Consequences: Max Weber and the Kantian Legacy". The Philosophical Forum. 41 (1–2): 51–67. doi:10.1111/j.1467-9191.2009.00348.x. ISSN 0031-806X. S2CID 143827254.
- Callison, William (April 2022). "The Politics of Rationality in Early Neoliberalism: Max Weber, Ludwig von Mises, and the Socialist Calculation Debate". Journal of the History of Ideas. 83 (2): 269–291. doi:10.1353/jhi.2022.0013. ISSN 0022-5037. PMID 35603614. S2CID 248985967. Project MUSE 855167.
- Carruthers, Bruce G.; Espeland, Wendy Nelson (July 1991). "Accounting for Rationality: Double-Entry Bookkeeping and the Rhetoric of Economic Rationality". American Journal of Sociology. 97 (1): 31–69. doi:10.1086/229739. ISSN 0002-9602. JSTOR 2781637. S2CID 144005958.
- Celikates, Robin; Flynn, Jeffrey (2023). "Critical Theory (Frankfurt School)". In Zalta, Edward N.; Nodelman, Uri (eds.). The Stanford Encyclopedia of Philosophy (Winter 2023 ed.). Metaphysics Research Lab, Stanford University. OCLC 37550526.
- Chalcraft, David J. (August 1993). "Weber, Wagner and Thoughts of Death". Sociology. 27 (3): 433–449. doi:10.1177/0038038593027003006. ISSN 0038-0385. JSTOR 42855232. S2CID 143445246.
- Craig, Gordon A. (18 February 1988). "The Kaiser and the Kritik". The New York Review of Books. Vol. 35, no. 2. pp. 17–20. ISSN 0028-7504.
- Demm, Eberhard (January 2017). "Max and Alfred Weber and Their Female Entourage". Max Weber Studies. 17 (1): 64–91. doi:10.1353/max.2017.a808647. ISSN 1470-8078. JSTOR 10.15543/maxweberstudies.17.1.64. S2CID 171435083.
- Derman, Joshua (2012). Max Weber in Politics and Social Thought: From Charisma to Canonization. Ideas in Context. Vol. 102 (First ed.). Cambridge University Press. doi:10.1017/CBO9781139198899. ISBN 978-1-139-19889-9. OCLC 793099522. S2CID 264281585.
- Ewing, Sally (April 1987). "Formal Justice and the Spirit of Capitalism: Max Weber's Sociology of Law". Law & Society Review. 21 (3): 487–512. doi:10.2307/3053379. ISSN 0023-9216. JSTOR 3053379. S2CID 147246253.
- Fitzi, Gregor (November 2019). "Max Weber's Concept of 'Modern Politics'". Journal of Classical Sociology. 19 (4): 361–376. doi:10.1177/1468795X19851368. ISSN 1468-795X. S2CID 189969724.
- Frommer, Jörg; Frommer, Sabine (May 1993). "Max Webers Krankheit – Soziologische Aspekte der Depressiven Struktur". Fortschritte der Neurologie · Psychiatrie (in German). 61 (5): 161–171. doi:10.1055/s-2007-999084. ISSN 0720-4299. PMID 8319927. S2CID 260157721.
- Gane, Nicholas (2002). Max Weber and Postmodern Theory: Rationalization versus Re-enchantment. London: Palgrave Macmillan. doi:10.1057/9780230502512. ISBN 978-0-333-93058-8. OCLC 48399032. S2CID 171377607.
- Gephart, Werner (2015). Law, Culture and Society: Max Weber's Comparative Cultural Sociology of Law. Recht als Kultur. Vol. 7. Translated by Nanz, Johannes. Frankfurt: Verlag Vittorio Klostermann. doi:10.5771/9783465142317. ISBN 978-3-465-14231-7. OCLC 904209251. S2CID 245532648.
- Gordon, Peter E. (11 June 2020). "Max the Fatalist". The New York Review of Books. Vol. 67, no. 10. pp. 32–33, 36. ISSN 0028-7504.
- Habermas, Jürgen (1990). The Philosophical Discourse of Modernity: Twelve Lectures. Cambridge, Massachusetts: MIT Press. ISBN 978-0-262-58102-8. OCLC 263623304.
- Hanke, Edith; Hübinger, Gangolf; Schwentker, Wolfgang (January 2012). "The Genesis of the Max Weber-Gesamtausgabe and the Contribution of Wolfgang J. Mommsen". Max Weber Studies. 12 (1): 59–94. doi:10.1353/max.2012.a808787. ISSN 1470-8078. JSTOR 24579988. S2CID 171047848. Project MUSE 808787.
- Hanke, Edith (September 2009). "'Max Weber's Desk Is Now My Altar': Marianne Weber and the Intellectual Heritage of Her Husband". History of European Ideas. 35 (3). Translated by Tribe, Keith: 349–359. doi:10.1016/j.histeuroideas.2009.01.003. ISSN 0191-6599. S2CID 219564548.
- Heath, Joseph (2024). "Methodological Individualism". In Zalta, Edward N. (ed.). The Stanford Encyclopedia of Philosophy (Summer 2024 ed.). Metaphysics Research Lab, Stanford University. OCLC 3755052.
- Hobsbawm, Eric (1987). The Age of Empire, 1875–1914. History of Civilization (First ed.). New York: Pantheon Books. ISBN 978-0-394-56319-0. OCLC 1024158611.
- Honigsheim, Paul (2017). Sica, Alan (ed.). The Unknown Max Weber (First ed.). Abingdon-on-Thames: Routledge. doi:10.4324/9781351302241. ISBN 978-1-351-30224-1. OCLC 1000454719. S2CID 143723962.
- Hübinger, Gangolf (July 2020). "Places of Memory. Max Weber in 2020: Some Personal Reflections". Max Weber Studies. 20 (2). Translated by Whimster, Sam: 240–249. doi:10.1353/max.2020.0003. ISSN 1470-8078. JSTOR 10.15543/maxweberstudies.20.2.240. S2CID 258101740. Project MUSE 808531.
- Huff, Toby E. (June 2025). "Max Weber's Comparative and Historical Sociology of Law. Extending the Legal Paradigm: A Prolegomenon". Historická Sociologie. 17 (1): 67–90. doi:10.14712/23363525.2025.5. ISSN 1804-0616. S2CID 280364744.
- Kaelber, Lutz (May 2003). "Max Weber's Dissertation". History of the Human Sciences. 16 (2): 27–56. doi:10.1177/0952695103016002002. ISSN 0952-6951. S2CID 143826984.
- Kaesler, Dirk (1988). Max Weber: An Introduction to His Life and Work. Translated by Hurd, Philippa. University of Chicago Press. ISBN 978-0-226-42560-3. OCLC 18167075. S2CID 142789327.
- Kaesler, Dirk (2014). Max Weber. Preuße, Denker, Muttersohn. Eine Biographie (in German) (First ed.). Munich: C. H. Beck. doi:10.17104/9783406660764. ISBN 978-3-406-66076-4. JSTOR j.ctv1168mt4. OCLC 878146290. S2CID 170890977.
- Kaesler, Dirk (November 2016). "Max Weber Never Was Mainstream—But Who Made Him a Classic of Sociology?". Serendipities. Journal for the Sociology and History of the Social Sciences. 1 (2): 121–137. doi:10.7146/serendipities.v1i2.122850. ISSN 2521-0947. S2CID 152137950.
- Kalberg, Stephen (July 2017). "Reconstructing Weber's Indian Rationalism: A Comparative Analysis". Max Weber Studies. 17 (2): 235–253. doi:10.1353/max.2017.a808620. ISSN 1470-8078. JSTOR 10.15543/maxweberstudies.17.2.235. S2CID 166169850. Project MUSE 808620.
- Kent, Stephen A. (Winter 1983). "Weber, Goethe, and the Nietzschean Allusion: Capturing the Source of the 'Iron Cage' Metaphor". Sociological Analysis. 44 (4): 297–319. doi:10.2307/3711612. JSTOR 3711612. S2CID 170414384.
- Kim, Sung Ho (2024). "Max Weber". In Zalta, Edward N.; Nodelman, Uri (eds.). The Stanford Encyclopedia of Philosophy (Winter 2024 ed.). Metaphysics Research Lab, Stanford University. OCLC 37550526.
- Kim, Sung Ho (2009). Max Weber's Politics of Civil Society (First ed.). Cambridge University Press. doi:10.1017/CBO9780511490286. ISBN 978-0-521-82057-8. OCLC 560239693. S2CID 141524545.
- Lepsius, M. Rainer (January 2004). "Mina Tobler and Max Weber: Passion Confined". Max Weber Studies. 4 (1). Translated by Whimster, Sam: 9–21. doi:10.15543/MWS/2004/1/3. ISSN 1470-8078. JSTOR 24579657. S2CID 146542227.
- Lengermann, Patricia; Niebrugge-Brantley, Jill (1998). The Women Founders: Sociology and Social Theory, 1830–1930: A Text/Reader. Boston: McGraw Hill. ISBN 978-0-07-037169-9. OCLC 37761947.
- Levy, Carl (2016). "Max Weber, Anarchism and Libertarian Culture: Personality and Power Politics". In Whimster, Sam (ed.). Max Weber and the Culture of Anarchy. London: Palgrave Macmillan. pp. 83–109. doi:10.1007/978-1-349-27030-9_4. ISBN 978-1-349-27030-9. OCLC 37843746. S2CID 152049490.
- Lichtblau, Klaus (January 2022). "On the Conclusion of the Max Weber Gesamtausgabe: A Meta-Critical Review". Max Weber Studies. 22 (1). Translated by Whimster, Sam: 74–124. doi:10.1353/max.2022.0004. ISSN 1470-8078. JSTOR 48785430. S2CID 252017012. Project MUSE 862056.
- Love, John (2012). "Max Weber's Ancient Judaism". In Turner, Stephen (ed.). The Cambridge Companion to Weber. The Cambridge Companions to Philosophy and Religion (First ed.). Cambridge University Press. pp. 200–220. doi:10.1017/CCOL9780521561495.012. ISBN 978-0-521-56149-5. S2CID 171354963.
- Löwith, Karl; Turner, Bryan S. (2002). Max Weber and Karl Marx. Routledge Classics in Sociology (First ed.). London: Routledge. doi:10.4324/9780203422229. ISBN 978-0-203-42222-9. OCLC 52423743. S2CID 142671088.
- Löwy, Michael (June 1996). "Figures of Weberian Marxism". Theory and Society. 25 (3): 431–446. doi:10.1007/BF00158264. ISSN 0304-2421. JSTOR 658052. S2CID 147323256.
- Löwy, Michael; Varikas, Eleni (July 2022). "Max Weber and Anarchism". Max Weber Studies. 22 (2): 94–109. doi:10.1353/max.2022.0011. ISSN 1470-8078. JSTOR 48785496. S2CID 252016939. Project MUSE 862085.
- Macionis, John J. (2012). Sociology (Fourteenth ed.). Boston: Pearson. ISBN 978-0-205-11671-3. OCLC 1024274649.
- Maas, Harro (December 2009). "Disciplining Boundaries: Lionel Robbins, Max Weber, and the Borderlands of Economics, History, and Psychology". Journal of the History of Economic Thought. 31 (4): 500–517. doi:10.1017/S1053837209990289. S2CID 146195008.
- Mayer, Carl (Winter 1975). "Max Weber's Interpretation of Karl Marx". Social Research. 42 (4): 701–719. ISSN 0037-783X. JSTOR 41582860.
- McKinnon, Andrew M. (March 2010). "Elective Affinities of the Protestant Ethic: Weber and the Chemistry of Capitalism". Sociological Theory. 28 (1): 108–126. doi:10.1111/j.1467-9558.2009.01367.x. hdl:2164/3035. ISSN 0735-2751. S2CID 144579790.
- Maclachlan, Fiona (July 2017). "Max Weber Within the Methodenstreit". Cambridge Journal of Economics. 41 (4): 1161–1175. doi:10.1093/cje/bew051. ISSN 0309-166X. S2CID 157572661.
- Maley, Terry (2011). Democracy and the Political in Max Weber's Thought. University of Toronto Press. doi:10.3138/9781442695948. ISBN 978-1-4426-9594-8. JSTOR 10.3138/j.ctt2ttgq2. S2CID 152451214. Project MUSE book 105762.
- Mommsen, Wolfgang J.; Steinberg, Michael (1984). Max Weber and German Politics, 1890–1920. University of Chicago Press. ISBN 978-0-226-53399-5. OCLC 1150275007. S2CID 141900118.
- Mommsen, Wolfgang J. (March 1997). "Max Weber and the Regeneration of Russia". The Journal of Modern History. 69 (1): 1–17. doi:10.1086/245438. ISSN 0022-2801. JSTOR 2953430. S2CID 143563307.
- Müller, Hans-Peter (2022). "Max Weber: The Making of an Improbable Classic". In Sica, Alan (ed.). The Routledge International Handbook on Max Weber. Routledge International Handbooks (First ed.). Abingdon-on-Thames: Routledge. pp. 37–48. doi:10.4324/9781003089537-4. ISBN 978-1-003-08953-7. OCLC 1346316238.
- Newman, David M. (2017). Sociology: Exploring the Architecture of Everyday Life, Brief Edition (Fifth ed.). Thousand Oaks, California: SAGE Publications. ISBN 978-1-5063-4585-7. OCLC 1392118802.
- Oakes, Guy; Vidich, Arthur J. (March 1999). "Gerth, Mills, and Shils: The Origins of From Max Weber". International Journal of Politics, Culture and Society. 12 (3): 399–433. doi:10.1023/A:1025920914039. JSTOR 20019978. S2CID 140802474.
- Oakes, Guy (1988). Weber and Rickert: Concept Formation in the Cultural Sciences. Cambridge, Massachusetts: MIT Press. ISBN 978-0-262-15034-7. OCLC 1391889459.
- Parkin, Frank (2013). Max Weber: Revised Edition. Key Sociologists (Second ed.). Abingdon-on-Thames: Routledge. doi:10.4324/9781315822280. ISBN 978-1-315-82228-0. OCLC 876294052.
- Petersen, William (2017). Against the Stream: Reflections of an Unconventional Demographer (First ed.). Abingdon-on-Thames: Routledge. doi:10.4324/9781315082844. ISBN 978-1-315-08284-4. OCLC 994145659. S2CID 198628069.
- Poggi, Gianfranco (2006). Weber: A Short Introduction. Cambridge: Polity. ISBN 978-0-7456-3489-0. OCLC 60794418. S2CID 142370875.
- Radkau, Joachim (2009). Max Weber: A Biography. Translated by Camiller, Patrick. Cambridge: Polity. ISBN 978-0-7456-4147-8. OCLC 1392375367. S2CID 170999086.
- Rhoads, John K. (2021). Critical Issues in Social Theory. University Park, Pennsylvania: Penn State University Press. doi:10.1515/9780271072470. ISBN 978-0-271-07247-0. OCLC 1162042882.
- Ritzer, George (2005). Enchanting a Disenchanted World: Revolutionizing the Means of Consumption (Second ed.). Thousand Oaks, California: Pine Forge Press. ISBN 978-0-7619-8819-9. OCLC 654326665.
- Ritzer, George (2009). Contemporary Sociological Theory and Its Classical Roots: The Basics (Second ed.). Boston: McGraw Hill. ISBN 978-0-07-340438-7. OCLC 555900314. S2CID 142436605.
- Ritzer, George; Wiedenhoft Murphy, Wendy (2019). Introduction to Sociology (Fifth ed.). Thousand Oaks, California: SAGE Publications. ISBN 978-1-5443-5513-9. OCLC 1180042403.
- Roth, Guenther (July 2016). "On Behalf of Economy and Society and Himself". Max Weber Studies. 16 (2): 250–253. doi:10.1353/max.2016.a808671. ISSN 1470-8078. JSTOR 10.15543/maxweberstudies.16.2.250. S2CID 157957640. Project MUSE 808671.
- Roth, Guenther (January 2005). "Transatlantic Connections: A Cosmopolitan Context for Max and Marianne Weber's New York Visit 1904". Max Weber Studies. 5 (1): 81–112. doi:10.1353/max.2005.a808950. ISSN 1470-8078. JSTOR 24580001. S2CID 133330011. Project MUSE 808950.
- Scaff, Lawrence A. (2011). Max Weber in America. Princeton University Press. doi:10.1515/9781400836710. ISBN 978-0-691-14779-6. JSTOR j.ctt24hrqb. OCLC 845249089. S2CID 142538285. Project MUSE book 31160.
- Schluchter, Wolfgang (July–September 2004). "The Approach of Max Weber's Sociology of Religion As Exemplified in His Study of Ancient Judaism". Archives de Sciences Sociales des Religions. 127 (4): 33–56. doi:10.4000/assr.2380. ISSN 0335-5985. S2CID 143512922.
- Schluchter, Wolfgang (January 2017). "Dialectics of Disenchantment: A Weberian Look at Western Modernity". Max Weber Studies. 17 (1). Translated by Bond, Niall: 24–47. doi:10.1353/max.2017.a808622. ISSN 1470-8078. JSTOR 10.15543/maxweberstudies.17.1.24. S2CID 151352912. Project MUSE 808622.
- Schluchter, Wolfgang (January 2014). "'How Ideas Become Effective in History': Max Weber on Confucianism and Beyond". Max Weber Studies. 14 (1): 11–31. doi:10.1353/max.2014.a808751. ISSN 1470-8078. JSTOR 24579948. S2CID 170089306. Project MUSE 808751.
- Schluchter, Wolfgang (January 2018). "The Two Great Heterodoxies in Ancient India: An Example of Max Weber's Anti-Hegelian Approach". Max Weber Studies. 18 (1): 87–106. doi:10.1353/max.2018.a808609. ISSN 1470-8078. JSTOR 10.15543/maxweberstudies.18.1.87. S2CID 172040941. Project MUSE 808609.
- Schroeder, Ralph (May 1995). "Disenchantment and Its Discontents: Weberian Perspectives on Science and Technology". The Sociological Review. 43 (2): 227–250. doi:10.1111/j.1467-954X.1995.tb00602.x. ISSN 0038-0261. S2CID 145221714.
- Schweitzer, Arthur (September 1975). "Frank Knight's Social Economics". History of Political Economy. 7 (3): 279–292. doi:10.1215/00182702-7-3-279. ISSN 0018-2702. S2CID 144698116.
- Scott, John (2019). The Emerald Guide to Max Weber. Emerald Guides to Social Thought. Bingley: Emerald Publishing. doi:10.1108/9781787691896. ISBN 978-1-78769-192-6. OCLC 1088436694. S2CID 150570462.
- Sibeon, Roger (2012). Rethinking Social Theory (First ed.). London: SAGE Publications. doi:10.4135/9781446216989. ISBN 978-1-4462-1698-9. OCLC 646696725.
- Sica, Alan (2017). Max Weber and the New Century (First ed.). Abingdon-on-Thames: Routledge. doi:10.4324/9780203786079. ISBN 978-0-203-78607-9. OCLC 1004354573. S2CID 159045162.
- Smith, David Norman (October 2019). "Max Weber's Odyssey: The Wild West, the Frontier, and the Capitalist Spirit". Fast Capitalism. 16 (2): 95–105. doi:10.32855/1930-014X.1275. ISSN 1930-014X. S2CID 213453888.
- Spengler, Oswald; Hughes, H. Stuart (1991). Werner, Helmut; Helps, Arthur (eds.). The Decline of the West: An Abridged Edition. Oxford Paperbacks. Translated by Atkinson, Charles Francis. Oxford University Press. ISBN 978-0-19-506634-0. OCLC 625153554.
- Swatos, William H. Jr.; Kivisto, Peter; Gustafson, Paul M. (1998). "Weber, Max (1864–1920)". In Swatos, William H. Jr. (ed.). Encyclopedia of Religion and Society. Walnut Creek, California: AltaMira Press. pp. 547–552. ISBN 978-0-7619-8956-1. OCLC 37361790. Archived from the original on 24 June 2025.
- Swedberg, Richard (October 1999). "Max Weber as an Economist and as a Sociologist: Towards a Fuller Understanding of Weber's View of Economics". American Journal of Economics and Sociology. 58 (4): 561–582. doi:10.1111/j.1536-7150.1999.tb03385.x. ISSN 0002-9246. JSTOR 3487998. S2CID 142197142.
- Swedberg, Richard; Agevall, Ola (2016). The Max Weber Dictionary: Key Words and Central Concepts (Second ed.). Stanford University Press. doi:10.1515/9781503600225. ISBN 978-1-5036-0022-5. OCLC 956984918.
- Tribe, Keith (January–April 2018). "Max Weber's 'Science as a Vocation': Context, Genesis, Structure". Sociologica. 12 (1): 125–136. doi:10.6092/ISSN.1971-8853/8432. ISSN 1971-8853. S2CID 150045429.
- Turner, Bryan S. (1996). For Weber: Essays on the Sociology of Fate (Second ed.). London: Sage Publications. ISBN 978-0-8039-7633-7. OCLC 47011840.
- Turner, Bryan S. (February 2011). "Max Weber and the Spirit of Resentment: The Nietzsche Legacy". Journal of Classical Sociology. 11 (1): 75–92. doi:10.1177/1468795X10391458. ISSN 1468-795X. S2CID 145236174.
- Turner, Charles (2001a). "Weberian Social Thought, History of". In Smelser, Neil J.; Baltes, Paul B. (eds.). International Encyclopedia of the Social & Behavioral Sciences. Vol. 24 (First ed.). Amsterdam: Elveiser. pp. 16407–16412. doi:10.1016/b0-08-043076-7/00100-5. ISBN 978-0-08-043076-8. OCLC 47869490. S2CID 140310427.
- Turner, Stephen (2019). "Causation, Value Judgments, Verstehen". In Hanke, Edith; Scaff, Lawrence; Whimster, Sam (eds.). The Oxford Handbook of Max Weber. Oxford Handbooks (First ed.). New York: Oxford University Press. pp. 575–595. doi:10.1093/oxfordhb/9780190679545.013.38. ISBN 978-0-19-067954-5. OCLC 1145076376. S2CID 198758257.
- Turner, Stephen (January 2007). "The Continued Relevance of Weber's Philosophy of Social Science". Max Weber Studies. 7 (1): 37–62. doi:10.1353/max.2007.a808884. hdl:10077/5339. ISSN 1470-8078. JSTOR 24579672. S2CID 34737021. Project MUSE 808884.
- Turner, Stephen (2001b). "Weber, Max (1864–1920)". In Smelser, Neil J.; Baltes, Paul B. (eds.). International Encyclopedia of the Social & Behavioral Sciences. Vol. 24 (First ed.). Amsterdam: Elveiser. pp. 16401–16407. doi:10.1016/B0-08-043076-7/00348-X. ISBN 978-0-08-043076-8. OCLC 47869490.
- Waters, Tony; Waters, Dagmar (March 2016). "Are the Terms 'Socio-Economic Status' and 'Class Status' a Warped Form of Reasoning for Max Weber?". Palgrave Communications. 2 (1) 16002: 1–13. doi:10.1057/palcomms.2016.2. ISSN 2055-1045. S2CID 147625219.
- Waters, Tony; Waters, Dagmar (2015). "Max Weber's Writing as a Product of World War I Europe". In Waters, Tony; Waters, Dagmar (eds.). Weber's Rationalism and Modern Society: New Translations on Politics, Bureaucracy, and Social Stratification (First ed.). New York: Palgrave Macmillan. pp. 19–28. doi:10.1057/9781137365866_2. ISBN 978-1-349-47664-0. OCLC 907284212. S2CID 156293402.
- Weber, Max (2019). Tribe, Keith (ed.). Economy and Society: A New Translation. Cambridge, Massachusetts: Harvard University Press. doi:10.4159/9780674240827. ISBN 978-0-674-24082-7. JSTOR j.ctv24trdzh. OCLC 1086210756.
- Weber, Max (1999). Swedberg, Richard (ed.). Essays in Economic Sociology. Princeton University Press. doi:10.1515/9780691218168. ISBN 978-0-691-00906-3. JSTOR j.ctv1416446. OCLC 40714136. S2CID 141823487.
- Weber, Max; Turner, Brian S. (2014). Gerth, Hans; Mills, C. Wright (eds.). From Max Weber: Essays in Sociology (First ed.). Abingdon-on-Thames: Routledge. doi:10.4324/9780203759240. ISBN 978-1-134-68894-4. OCLC 880683665. S2CID 230358177.
- Weber, Max (2023). Tribe, Keith (ed.). General Economic History. Routledge Classics. Translated by Knight, Frank; Tribe, Keith (First ed.). Abingdon-on-Thames: Routledge. doi:10.4324/9781003411857. ISBN 978-1-003-41185-7. OCLC 1393524164. S2CID 260858809.
- Weber, Max (2015). "The Distribution of Power Within the Gemeinschaft: Classes, Stände, Parties". In Waters, Tony; Waters, Dagmar (eds.). Weber's Rationalism and Modern Society: New Translations on Politics, Bureaucracy, and Social Stratification (First ed.). New York: Palgrave Macmillan. pp. 37–58. doi:10.1057/9781137365866_4. ISBN 978-1-349-47664-0. OCLC 907284212. S2CID 156190933.
- Weber, Max (2025). Baumgarten, Eduard (ed.). Max Weber. Werk und Person. Dokumente, Ausgewählt und Kommentiert Von Eduard Baumgarten (in German). Tübingen: Mohr Siebeck. doi:10.1628/978-3-16-169697-8. ISBN 978-3-16-169697-8. OCLC 576084885.
- Weber, Max (2011). "The Nature of Social Action". In Runciman, Garry (ed.). Max Weber: Selections in Translation. Translated by Matthews, Eric. Cambridge University Press. pp. 7–32. doi:10.1017/CBO9780511810831.005. ISBN 978-0-511-81083-1. OCLC 858858223. S2CID 142627438.
- Weber, Max (2012). "The 'Objectivity' of Knowledge in Social Science and Social Policy". In Bruun, Hans Henrik; Whimster, Sam (eds.). Max Weber: Collected Methodological Writings. Translated by Bruun, Hans Henrik (First ed.). Abingdon-on-Thames: Routledge. pp. 100–138. doi:10.4324/9780203804698-4. ISBN 978-0-203-80469-8. OCLC 798534064. S2CID 220744640.
- Weber, Max (2013). Kalberg, Stephen (ed.). The Protestant Ethic and the Spirit of Capitalism. Translated by Kalberg, Stephen (First ed.). Abingdon-on-Thames: Routledge. doi:10.4324/9781315063645. ISBN 978-1-135-97398-8. OCLC 857081731.
- Weber, Max (1997). Wells, Gordon C.; Baehr, Peter (eds.). The Russian Revolutions. Translated by Wells, Gordon C.; Baehr, Peter. Cambridge: Polity. ISBN 978-0-7456-1752-7. OCLC 191809634.
- Weber, Max (2004). Owen, David; Strong, Tracy B. (eds.). The Vocation Lectures. Translated by Livingstone, Rodney. Indianapolis: Hackett Publishing Company. ISBN 978-0-87220-666-3. OCLC 53019391. S2CID 141607292.
- Whimster, Sam (2016). "Introduction to Weber, Ascona and Anarchism". In Whimster, Sam (ed.). Max Weber and the Culture of Anarchy. London: Palgrave Macmillan. pp. 83–109. doi:10.1007/978-1-349-27030-9_1. ISBN 978-1-349-27030-9. OCLC 37843746. S2CID 156361661.
- Whimster, Sam (January 2023). "Legitimizing Bureaucracy and the Challenge of Caesarism". Max Weber Studies. 23 (1): 82–108. doi:10.1353/max.2023.0006. ISSN 1470-8078. S2CID 256106741. Project MUSE 877866.
- Whimster, Sam (December 1995). "Max Weber on the Erotic and Some Comparisons With the Work of Foucault". International Sociology. 10 (4): 447–462. doi:10.1177/026858095010004006. ISSN 0268-5809. S2CID 143771412.
- Whimster, Sam (2007). Understanding Weber (First ed.). Abingdon-on-Thames: Routledge. doi:10.4324/9780203030561. ISBN 978-0-203-03056-1. OCLC 71842656.
