= Political capitalism =

Concept introduced by Max Weber

Political capitalism or politically oriented capitalism is a concept introduced by Max Weber in his 1921 book Economy and Society to describe monetary profit-making through non-market means. In 2018, Holcombe describes political capitalism as an economic system in which the sharp distinction between states and markets is blurred.

Robert Brenner and Dylan Riley have characterized the post-1990 economy of United States as political capitalism, where raw 'political power' rather than 'productive investment' is the "key determinant of rate of return".

Filippa Chatzistavrou broadens the concept of political capitalism applied in the digital age by pushing further the idea of states and high tech markets being co-constitutive in order to include not only rent seeking, property rights' issues and surplus extraction mechanisms, but also models of governance.

== Background ==
The definition of capitalism as an economic system based on monetary profit-making rather than a subsistence economy is shared by Max Weber and Fernand Braudel.

== See also ==
- Crony capitalism
- Political capital
- State capitalism
- Revolving door (politics)
