= Inner-worldly asceticism =

Max Weber's thesis on self-denial

Worldliness (German innerweltliche) was characterized by Max Weber in Economy and Society as the concentration of human behavior upon activities leading to salvation within the context of the everyday world.

He saw it as a prime influence in the emergence of modernity and the technological world, a point developed in The Protestant Ethic and the Spirit of Capitalism.

== Four-fold typology ==
Weber's typology of religion set off the distinction between asceticism and mysticism against that between inner-worldly and other-worldly ( ausserweltliche ) orientations, to produce a four-fold set of religious types. According to Talcott Parsons, otherworldly stances provided no leverage upon socio-economic problems, and inner-worldly mystics attached no significance to the material world surrounding them, the inner-worldly ascetic acted within the institutions of the world, while being opposed to them, and as an instrument of God. However Stefan Zaleski showed that inner-worldly mysticism that is magic was interested in active transformation of reality.

In religions which can be characterized by inner-worldly asceticism, the world appears to the religious virtuoso as his responsibility.

== Rationalism ==
For Weber, the worldly ascetic is a rationalist. He rationalizes his own conduct but also rejects conduct which is specifically irrational, esthetic, or dependent upon his own emotional reactions to the world.

Inner-worldly asceticism, including above all Protestantism, taught the fulfillment of obligations in the world as the sole method of proving religious merit. Its emphasis on the importance of one's calling encouraged the differentiation of life-spheres, while its rationality favoured an emphasis on natural law – further aspects enhancing the impact Weber postulated such asceticism had upon the development of capitalism, or rather the particular type of capitalism Weber saw as marked by "the rational organization and institutionalization of social relationships...rational bourgeois capitalism".

== Criticism ==
Critics have challenged the validity of Weber's linking of Calvinism, and predestination in particular, with the emergence of the capitalist spirit; as well as more generally disputing any inherent or correlative link between Protestantism and capitalism.

Postmodernism in its repudiation of metanarratives has rejected Weber's theory as one Eurocentric aspect of such grand tales; though Fredric Jameson sees it as illuminating at least one facet of the bourgeois cultural revolution—the psycho-sociological transformation that accompanied the move from traditional agrarian society to the modern urban world-system.

== See also ==
- Disenchantment
- Erich Fromm
- R. H. Tawney
