= Economy and Society =

German-language work in economics and sociology by Max Weber

- Hardcover edition
- Author: Max Weber
- Original title: Wirtschaft und Gesellschaft. Grundriß der verstehenden Soziologie
- Translator: Guenther Roth, Claus Wittich
- Language: English
- Subject: Sociology
- Genre: Non-fiction
- Publisher: Bedminster Press
- Publication date: 1968
- Publication place: United States
- Media type: Print
- ISBN: 0-520-03500-3

Economy and Society: An Outline of Interpretive Sociology (1921; German: Wirtschaft und Gesellschaft. Grundriß der verstehenden Soziologie; or simply Economy and Society) is a book by political economist and sociologist Max Weber, published posthumously in Germany by his wife Marianne. Alongside The Protestant Ethic and the Spirit of Capitalism (1905), it is considered to be one of Weber's most important works. Extremely broad in scope, the book covers numerous themes including religion, economics, politics, public administration, and sociology. A complete translation of the work was not published in English until 1968.

In 1998, the International Sociological Association listed this work as the most important sociological book of the 20th century.

== Quotes ==
=== Sociology ===
Sociology…is a science concerning itself with the interpretive understanding of social action and thereby with a causal explanation of its course and consequences. We shall speak of "action" insofar as the acting individual attaches a subjective meaning to his behavior.

=== Ideal types (pure types) ===
For the purposes of a typological scientific analysis it is convenient to treat all irrational, affectually determined elements of behavior as factors of deviation from a conceptually pure type of rational action. For example a panic on the stock exchange can be most conveniently analysed by attempting to determine first what the course of action would have been if it had not been influenced by irrational affects; it is then possible to introduce the irrational components as accounting for the observed deviations from this hypothetical course...Only in this way is it possible to assess the causal significance of irrational factors as accounting for the deviation of this type. The construction of a purely rational course of action in such cases serves the sociologist as a type (ideal type) which has the merit of clear understandability and lack of ambiguity. By comparison with this it is possible to understand the ways in which actual action is influenced by irrational factors of all sorts, such as affects and errors, in that they account for the deviation from the line of conduct which would be expected on hypothesis that the action were purely rational.

== Concepts ==
=== State violence ===
Much like in other works, Weber makes it a point to mention the state's role in legitimizing and perpetuating violence. Weber writes that legal norms exist when they are kept through “...normally directly physical, means of coercion of the political community”. This legal norm can extend into further arms of the government and the public as described when Weber writes, “In the case of certain events occurring there is general agreement that certain organs of the community can be expected to go into official action, and the very expectation of such action is apt to induce conformity with the commands derived from the generally accepted interpretation of that legal norm….

=== Orientations of social action ===
Social action, like all action, may be oriented in four ways:

1. Instrumentally rational (zweckrational): action "determined by expectations as to the behavior of objects in the environment and of other human beings; these expectations are used as "conditions" or "means" for the attainment of the actor's own rationally pursued and calculated ends."
2. Value-rational (wertrational): action "determined by a conscious belief in the value for its own sake of some ethical, aesthetic, religious, or other form of behavior, independently of its prospects of success."
3. Affectual (especially emotional): action "determined by the actor's specific affects and feeling states."
4. Traditional: action "determined by ingrained habituation."

=== Religion ===
In part 2, chapter VI, Weber distinguishes three ideal types of religious activity:

1. World-flying mysticism;
2. World-rejecting asceticism; and
3. Inner-worldly asceticism.

He also separated magic as pre-religious activity.

== The City ==
The City is a 1921 book by Max Weber, a German economist and sociologist. It was published posthumously. In 1924 it was incorporated into Economy and Society.

== See also ==
- Political capitalism – Concept introduced by Max Weber
