= The "Objectivity" of Knowledge in Social Science and Social Policy =

In standard scientific enquiry

"The "Objectivity" of Knowledge in Social Science and Social Policy" (German: Die 'Objektivität' sozialwissenschaftlicher und sozialpolitischer Erkenntnis) is a 1904 essay written by Max Weber, a German economist and sociologist, originally published in German in the 1904 issues of the Archiv für Sozialwissenschaft und Sozialpolitik.

The objectivity essay discusses essential concepts of Weber's sociology: "ideal type," "(social) action," "empathic understanding," "imaginary experiment," "value-free analysis," and "objectivity of sociological understanding".

With his objectivity essay, Weber pursued two goals. On the one hand, he wanted to outline the research program of the Archiv für Sozialwissenschaft und Sozialforschung from his point of view, in particular its position on the question of non-judgmental science. On the other hand, Weber dealt with the question of how objectively valid truths are possible in the field of cultural sciences.

== General and cited sources ==
- Härpfer, Claudius; Kaden, Tom (2020). "Die »Objektivität« sozialwissenschaftlicher und sozialpolitischer Erkenntnis (1904)". In Müller, Hans-Peter; Sigmund, Steffen (eds.). Max Weber-Handbuch. Leben – Werk – Wirkung (in German) (Second ed.). Stuttgart: J.B. Metzler. pp. 289–293. doi:10.1007/978-3-476-05142-4_65. ISBN 978-3-476-05142-4. S2CID 218931144.
- Swedberg, Richard; Agevall, Ola (2016). The Max Weber Dictionary: Key Words and Central Concepts (Second ed.). Stanford University Press. doi:10.1515/9781503600225. ISBN 978-1-5036-0022-5. OCLC 956984918.
- Weber, Max (2012). "The 'Objectivity' of Knowledge in Social Science and Social Policy". In Bruun, Hans Henrik; Whimster, Sam (eds.). Max Weber: Collected Methodological Writings. Translated by Bruun, Hans Henrik (First ed.). Abingdon-on-Thames: Routledge. pp. 100–138. doi:10.4324/9780203804698-4. ISBN 978-0-203-80469-8. OCLC 798534064. S2CID 220744640.
