= Ethic of ultimate ends =

Concept in the moral philosophy of Max Weber

The ethic of ultimate ends, moral conviction, or conviction is a concept in the moral philosophy of Max Weber, in which individuals act in a faithful, rather than rational, manner.

We must be clear about the fact that all ethically oriented conduct may be guided by one of two fundamentally differing and irreconcilably opposed maxims: conduct can be oriented to an "ethic of ultimate ends" or to an "ethic of responsibility." This is not to say that an ethic of ultimate ends is identical with irresponsibility, or that an ethic of responsibility is identical with unprincipled opportunism. Naturally, nobody says that. However, there is an abysmal contrast between conduct that follows the maxim of an ethic of ultimate ends—that, is in religious terms, "the Christian does rightly and leaves the results with the Lord"—and conduct that follows the maxim of an ethic of responsibility, in which case one has to give an account of the foreseeable results of one's action."

— From Politics as a Vocation, Max Weber, 1918.

The "ultimate end" is out of the hands of the actor. So long as he/she acts in a moral manner, any bad results, or negative ends, are not the responsibility of the actor and ultimately a result of God's will or other forces.

== Applications ==
In science, Weber argued that the discovery of laws is not the end of scientific inquiry since they have been rendered irrational by the inductivist and deductivist approaches. The thinker held that the discovery of the causes and reason behind these laws is the ultimate goal. Ultimate end is also expressed in the realm of policymaking in the way decisions are not guided by the moral values of those who are making them. Politicians, for instance, must sometimes use extraordinary and non-moral means to achieve certain goals because an alternative method based on ethics does not often address the realities of everyday life. According to Weber, politics involves constant struggle among bearers of different rationally irreconcilable values and successfully advancing any value depends not on ethics but the reality of power.

== See also ==
- Consequentialism
- Deontology
