= Hans Gerth =

German-American sociologist (1908–1978)

Hans Heinrich Gerth (Kassel, April 24, 1908 – Frankfurt, December 29, 1978) was a German–American sociologist.

Gerth studied in Heidelberg under Karl Jaspers, Emil Lederer, Alfred Weber and especially Karl Mannheim. Later, Paul Tillich and Adolph Lowe were his academic teachers at the University of Frankfurt am Main. He spent the academic year 1929/30 at the London School of Economics. After his doctorate in Frankfurt in 1933, he became a research assistant to Rudolf Heberle at the University of Kiel. He then worked as a journalist until 1937, including as Berlin correspondent for the Chicago Daily News. Gerth emigrated to the United States via Great Britain in 1938. There he initially encountered the mistrust of emigrants who had already left Germany in 1933. According to a phrase he coined himself, he was the prototype of the "Aryan latecomer" in exile.

Until 1940, he taught sociology as an assistant professor at the University of Illinois Urbana-Champaign, then also as an assistant professor and from 1947 as a professor at the University of Wisconsin. During these years he devoted himself intensively to translating the works of Max Weber. In the United States, Gerth worked closely with C. Wright Mills, who had initially been his student. In 1971 he returned to Germany, where he was professor of sociology at the Goethe University Frankfurt until 1975.

He developed a close collaboration with the sociologist Mills. He was the author of works such as Character and Social Structure: The Psychology of Social Institutions (Harcourt, Brace and Company, 1953), together with Mills; or Bürgerliche Intelligenz um 1800: zur Soziologie des deutschen Frühliberalismus (Vandenhoeck & Ruprecht, 1976); among others. He was also the translator and editor, also with Mills, of From Max Weber: Essays in Sociology (Oxford University Press, 1946), texts by Max Weber.

The following have been written about his life: The Monologue: Hans Gerth (1908–1978): A Memoir (Intercontinental Press, 1982), by Don Martindale; and Collaboration, Reputation and Ethics in American Academic Life: Hans H. Gerth and C. Wright Mills (Southern Illinois University Press, 1999), by Guy Oakes and Arthur J. Vidich.

== General and cited sources ==
- Gerth, Hans (1976). Bürgerliche Intelligenz um 1800: zur Soziologie des deutschen Frühliberalismus (in German). Göttingen: Vandenhoeck & Ruprecht.
- Gerth, Nobuko (1993). "Hans H. Gerth and C. Wright Mills: Partnership and Partisanship". International Journal of Politics, Culture, and Society. 7 (1). Springer: 133–154. doi:10.1007/BF02142352. ISSN 1573-3416. JSTOR 20007127.
- Gross, Feliks (1985). "The Monologue: Hans Gerth (1908-1978): A Memoir by Don Martindale". International Social Science Review. 60 (3). Pi Gamma Mu, International Honor Society in Social Sciences: 90–92. ISSN 2332-0419. JSTOR 41881654.
- Jenks, Leland H. (May 1948). "From Max Weber: Essays in Sociology. by H. H. Gerth, C. Wright Mills; Max Weber: The Theory of Social and Economic Organization. by A. M. Henderson, Talcott Parson". The Journal of Economic History. 8 (1). Cambridge University Press / Economic History Association: 69–71. doi:10.1017/S0022050700053857. ISSN 1471-6372. JSTOR 2112951.
- Locher, Frances Carol; Evory, Ann, eds. (1979). Contemporary Authors: A Bio-bibliographical Guide to Current Authors and Their Works. Ed. Frances Carol Locher, Volúmenes 81-84. Gale Research Company. ISBN 9780810300460.
- Nielsen, Donald A. (2000). "Hans H. Gerth, C. Wright Mills, and the Legacy of Max Weber. Collaboration, Reputation and Ethics in American Academic Life: Hans H. Gerth and C. Wright Mills by Guy Oakes, Arthur J. Vidich". International Journal of Politics, Culture, and Society. 13 (4). Springer: 649–661. doi:10.1023/A:1022975124672. ISSN 1573-3416. JSTOR 20020053.
- Thorne, S. E. (November 1946). "From Max Weber: Essays in Sociology by H. H. Gerth, C. Wright Mills". The Yale Law Journal. 56 (1). Yale Law Journal Company, Inc.: 188–191. doi:10.2307/793261. ISSN 0044-0094. JSTOR 793261.
- Vidich, Arthur J. (August 1955). "Character and Social Structure: The Psychology of Social Institutions. Hans Gerth and C. Wright Mills. New York: Harcourt, Brace and Company, 1953". American Anthropologist. 57 (4): 905–907. doi:10.1525/aa.1955.57.4.02a00420. ISSN 0002-7294.
- Weber, Max (1946). Gerth, H. H.; Mills, C. Wright (eds.). From Max Weber: Essays in sociology. New York: Oxford University Press.
