= The Economic Ethics of the World Religions =

Book by Max Weber

The Economic Ethics of the World Religions (German: Die Wirtschaftsethik der Weltreligionen) is an unfinished book series by Max Weber. Weber's work in the field of sociology of religion began with the book The Protestant Ethic and the Spirit of Capitalism. The book series contains The Religion of China, The Religion of India, and Ancient Judaism. However, his work was left incomplete as a result of his sudden death in 1920, which prevented him from following Ancient Judaism with studies of early Christianity and Islam. The three main themes within the books were: religious ideas' effect on economic activities, the relationship between social stratification and religious ideas, and the distinguishable characteristics of Western civilisation. His goal was to find reasons for the different developmental paths of the cultures of the Western world and the Eastern world, without making value judgments, unlike the contemporaneous social Darwinists. Weber simply wanted to explain the distinctive elements of Western civilisation. Weber also proposed a socio-evolutionary model of religious change where societies moved from magic to ethical monotheism, with the intermediatory steps of polytheism, pantheism, and monotheism. According to him, this was the result of growing economic stability, which allowed for professionalisation and the evolution of an increasingly sophisticated priesthood. As societies grew more complex and encompassed different groups, a hierarchy of gods developed. Meanwhile, as their power became more centralised, the concept of a universal God became more popular and desirable.

== General and Cited Sources ==
- Allan, Kenneth D. (2005). Explorations in Classical Sociological Theory: Seeing the Social World. Thousand Oaks, California: Pine Forge Press. ISBN 978-1-4129-0572-5. OCLC 1034668313.
- Bellah, Robert N. (June 1999). "Max Weber and World-Denying Love: A Look at the Historical Sociology of Religion". Journal of the American Academy of Religion. 67 (2): 277–304. doi:10.1093/jaarel/67.2.277. ISSN 0002-7189. JSTOR 1465738. S2CID 170701651. Archived from the original on 28 September 2021.
- Bendix, Reinhard; Roth, Guenther (1977). Max Weber: An Intellectual Portrait. Berkeley, California: University of California Press. ISBN 978-0-520-03194-4. OCLC 1150290821.
- Kim, Sung Ho (2022). "Max Weber". In Zalta, Edward N.; Nodelman, Uri (eds.). The Stanford Encyclopedia of Philosophy (Winter 2022 ed.). Metaphysics Research Lab, Stanford University. OCLC 37550526.
- Schluchter, Wolfgang (January 2018). "The Two Great Heterodoxies in Ancient India: An Example of Max Weber's Anti-Hegelian Approach". Max Weber Studies. 18 (1): 87–106. doi:10.1353/max.2018.a808609. ISSN 1470-8078. JSTOR 10.15543/maxweberstudies.18.1.87. S2CID 172040941. Project MUSE 808609.
- Swedberg, Richard; Agevall, Ola (2016). The Max Weber Dictionary: Key Words and Central Concepts (Second ed.). Stanford University Press. doi:10.1515/9781503600225. ISBN 978-1-5036-0022-5. OCLC 956984918.
- Weber, Max (1999). Swedberg, Richard (ed.). Essays in Economic Sociology. Princeton University Press. doi:10.1515/9780691218168. ISBN 978-0-691-00906-3. JSTOR j.ctv1416446. OCLC 40714136. S2CID 141823487.
