= Max Weber bibliography =

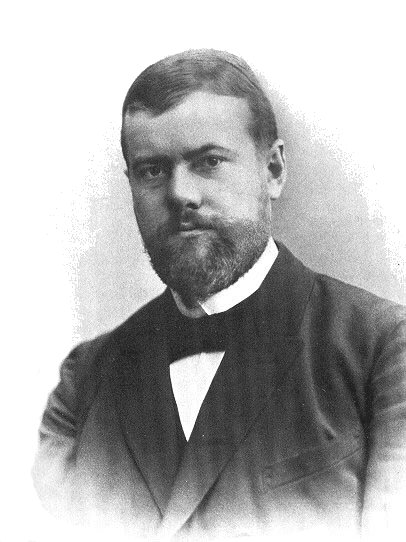
An 1894 portrait of Max Weber

This is a chronological list of works by Max Weber. Original titles with dates of publication and translated titles are given when possible, then a list of works translated into English, with earliest-found date of translation. The list of translations is most likely incomplete.

Weber wrote all his books in German. Original titles published after his death (1920) are likely to be compilations of unfinished works (note the term 'Collected Essays...' in the titles). Many translations are of parts or selections from various German originals, and the names of the translations often do not reveal which German works they are drawn from.

== Originals ==
- Zur Geschichte der Handelgesellschaften im Mittelalter (The History of Medieval Business Organizations) (1889)
- Die Römische Agrargeschichte in ihrer Bedeutung für das Staats- und Privatrecht (Roman Agrarian History and its Significance for Public and Private Law) (1891)
- Die Verhältnisse der Landarbeiter im ostelbischen Deutschland (1892) (Condition of Farm Labor in Eastern Germany)
- Die Börse (1894–1896) (The stock exchange)
- Der Nationalstaat und die Volkswirtschaftspolitik. (1895) (The National State and Economic Policy) - inaugural lecture at Freiburg University
- Gesammelte Aufsatze zur Religionssoziologie (Collected Essays on the Sociology of Religion) (1920–1921)
- Gesammelte Politische Schriften (Collected Political Miscellanies) (1921)
- Die rationalen und soziologischen Grundlagen der Musik (Rational and Sociological Foundations of Music) (1921)
- Gesammelte Aufsätze zur Wissenschaftslehre (Collected Essays on Scientific Theory) (1922)
- Wirtschaft und Gesellschaft (Economy and Society) (1922)
- Gesammelte Aufsätze zur Soziologie und Sozialpolitik (Collected Essays on Sociology and Social Policy) (1924)
- Wirtschaftsgeschichte (General Economic History) (1924)
- Staatssoziologie (Sociology of the State) (1956)
- Max Weber-Gesamtausgabe Critical edition of the Collected Works.

== Translations ==
- The Protestant Ethic and the Spirit of Capitalism (original - 1904–5; 1st translation - 1930; 2nd translation - 2012) translated into English by Talcott Parsons; 2nd translation by Stephen Kalberg.
- From Max Weber: Essays in Sociology (translation - 1946) ISBN 0-19-500462-0
- The Theory of Social and Economic Organization (Talcott Parsons' translation of volume 1 of Economy and Society) (original - 1915?, translation - 1947)
- Max Weber on the Methodology of the Social Sciences (translation 1949)
- General Economic History - The Social Causes of the Decay of Ancient Civilisation (original - 1927, translation 1950)
- The Religion of China: Confucianism and Taoism (translation - 1951)
- Ancient Judaism (original 1917–1920, part of Gesammelte Aufsatze zur Religionssoziologie in 1920–1921, translation - 1952)
- Max Weber on Law in Economy and Society (translation - 1954)
- The City (original - 1921, translation - 1958)
- The Religion of India: The Sociology of Hinduism and Buddhism (translation - 1958)
- Rational and Social Foundations of Music (translation - 1958)
- The Three Types of Legitimate Rule (translation - 1958)
- Basic Concepts in Sociology (translation - 1962)
- Sociology of Religion (original - 1920–1; translation - 1963) translated into English by Ephraim Fischoff.
- Economy and Society: An Outline of Interpretive Sociology (1st translation - 1968; 2nd translation - 2019) - 1st translation into English by Guenther Roth and Claus Wittich; 2nd translation by Keith Tribe.
- The Agrarian Sociology of Ancient Civilizations (translation - 1976)
- Critique of Stammler (translation - 1977)
- On Charisma and Institution Building (translation - 1994)
- Weber: Political Writings (translation - 1994)
- The Russian Revolutions (original - 1905, translation - 1995)
- Essays in Economic Sociology (translation - 1999)
- Weber's Rationalism and Modern Society: New Translations on Politics, Bureaucracy, and Social Stratification (original 1914–1919, translation - 2015)

Translations of unknown date

- Roscher and Knies and the Logical Problem of Historical Economics (original? - 1903–1905)
- Sociology of Community (translation - ?)
- Sociology of the World Religions: Introduction (translation - ?)
- The Rejection and the Meaning of the World (translation - ?)
- The Objectivity of the Sociological and Social-Political Knowledge (original? - 1904)
- Politics as a Vocation (original? - 1919)
- Science as a Vocation [?] ('Wissenschaft wie Beruf, Politik wie Beruf' ='Science as a Job, Politics as a Job')
- Sociology of Rulership and Religion (translation - ?)
- The Protestant Sects and the Spirit of Capitalism [?]

== Works available online ==
See 'External links' section of Max Weber article for a list of websites containing online works of Max Weber.
