= The Protestant Sects and the Spirit of Capitalism =

"The Protestant Sects and the Spirit of Capitalism" (German: Die protestantischen Sekten und der Geist des Kapitalismus) is an essay written by Max Weber. It was published in two parts in the Frankfurter Zeitung on 13 and 15 April 1906.

== Summary ==
The essay is based on Weber's observations of American businessmen in 1904, during a trip he took to visit relatives in Ohio and North Carolina, and to do research in the libraries of American universities that had Protestant affiliations. Despite the strict Separation of Church and State in the US, businessmen never failed to ask (casually) about each other's religious affiliations. Weber eventually realized that this odd custom (from a European point of view) acted as a kind of "credit check".

This worked for two reasons. First, membership in a Protestant sect was voluntary (unlike the state-sponsored Churches in Europe), and they only accepted members who had demonstrated a certain standard of behavior. Any member who failed to behave as expected would face pressure to reform, or lose his membership. Therefore, any member in good standing could be trusted in business (regardless of which sect he belonged to).

Second, the Protestant sects were run by their members, and the pastor was their employee (unlike state-sponsored Churches, where the pastor might be a political appointee). If a pastor became lax or corrupt, the members could replace him. Congregations also insisted that their pastors should preach ethics, rather than the finer points of religious dogma (which they considered to be less important than ethical behavior).

As the influence of religion declined (particularly in the larger cities), this function had been taken up by secular businessmen's organizations. Again, these organizations only accepted members who demonstrated a certain standard of behavior, and that standard was enforced by the members rather than the hierarchy. Traveling salesmen would always be sure to wear a lapel pin indicating membership in one organization or another, because without such an affiliation, people wouldn't trust them. Joining such an organization was often a sign that an immigrant was becoming assimilated into American culture.

Both the religious and secular versions of this phenomenon were already dying out in the larger cities. In his book The Protestant Ethic and the Spirit of Capitalism, Weber theorized that having a large number of businessmen who could be counted on to behave ethically was important to the growth of Capitalism, and that this had its origins in the Protestant Reformation (particularly in Calvinism and its spiritual descendants), although it had later become secularized.
