= Condition of Farm Labour in Eastern Germany =

1892 book by Maximilian Weber

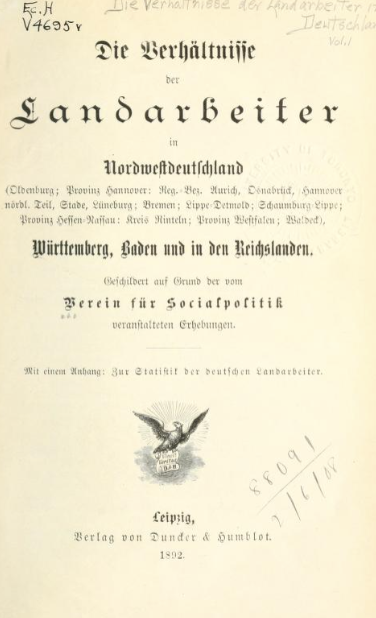
- Title page for Die Verhältnisse der Landarbeiter im ostelbischen Deutschland (1892)
- Author: Max Weber
- Publication date: 1892

Condition of Farm Labour in Eastern Germany (German: Die Verhältnisse der Landarbeiter im ostelbischen Deutschland) is a book written by Max Weber, a German economist and sociologist, in 1892. Note that the original edition was in German and the title can be translated as "Condition of Farm Labour in Eastern Germany".

In 1890 an association (known as the Verein für Socialpolitik) of scholars, government officials and other specialists decided to study the situation of landowners in Germany. Weber assumed responsibility for reviewing data from German provinces east of the Elbe River.

The situation in that part of Germany was influenced by the influx of migratory workers from Eastern Europe, with special regards to Poles and Russians, while the German labourers wanted to increase their upward social mobility, especially by changing the traditional labour relations of that region (workers could only become labourers on annual contract).

However, their demands and expectations were actually putting them in a weaker position regarding the economic struggle for survival, as they were less competitive than migratory workers.

Weber analyzed those changing labour relations as a symptom of widespread changes in the entire German society.
