= Hector Menteith Robertson =

Hector Menteith Robertson (1905–1984) was an economic historian who held the positions of Jagger Professor of Economics at the University of Cape Town and president of the Economic Society of South Africa (1951–52). He was also an editor and frequent contributor to the South African Journal of Economics.

== Life ==
Robertson was born in Leeds to Scottish parents. He studied at Leeds University, graduating B.A. in 1925 and M.A. in 1926, and at Emmanuel College, Cambridge. At Cambridge he was invited to the weekly Political Economy Club set up by John Maynard Keynes. His thesis, a critical response to R. H. Tawney's Religion and the Rise of Capitalism (1926) and Max Weber's The Protestant Ethic and the Spirit of Capitalism (1930; German edition 1905), was published in 1933 as Aspects of the Rise of Economic Individualism.

In 1930 Robertson became senior lecturer in Cape Town, where he remained for the rest of his career. Much of his research focused on the history of the Dutch East India Company, particularly in southern Africa.

His retirement was marked by a Festschrift edited by Marcelle Kooy, Studies in Economics and Economic History: Essays in Honour of Professor H.M. Robertson (Duke University Press, 1972).

== Works ==
=== Books ===
- Aspects of the Rise of Economic Individualism (Cambridge University Press, 1933)
- South Africa: Economic and Political Aspects (Duke University Press, 1957)

=== Articles ===
- "Economic Historians and their Colleagues", SAJE, 1946
- "European Economic Developments in the 16th Century", SAJE, March 1950
- "The Politico-Economic Background of Jan Van Riebeeck's Settlement", SAJE, Sept. 1952
- "The Ricardo Problem", SAJE, Sept. 1957
