= Ancient Judaism (book) =

1919 essay by Max Weber

- First English translation (publ. Free Press)
- Author: Max Weber
- Genre: religious history
- Publication date: 1917

Ancient Judaism (German: Das antike Judentum) is an essay written by the German economist and sociologist Max Weber in the early 20th century. The original edition appeared in the 1917–1919 issues of the Archiv für Sozialwissenschaft und Sozialpolitik. Marianne Weber, his wife, published the essays as Part Three of his Gesammelte Aufsatze zur Religionssoziologie in 1920–1921. An English translation was made in 1952 and several editions were released since then.

It was his fourth and last major work on the sociology of religion, after The Protestant Ethic and the Spirit of Capitalism, The Religion of China: Confucianism and Taoism and The Religion of India: The Sociology of Hinduism and Buddhism. In this work he attempts to explain the factors that were responsible for the early differences between Oriental and Occidental religiosity. It is especially visible when the mysticism developed by Western Christianity is compared with the asceticism that flourished within the religious traditions of India. Weber's premature death in 1920 prevented him from following Ancient Judaism with his planned analysis of the Psalms, the Book of Job, Rabbinic Judaism, early Christianity and Islam.

Weber wrote that

Anyone who is heir to traditions of modern European civilization will approach problems of universal history with a set of questions, which to him appear both inevitable and legitimate. These questions will turn on the combination of circumstances which has brought about the cultural phenomena that are uniquely Western and that have at the same time (...) a universal cultural significance

Weber notes that Judaism not only fathered Christianity and Islam, but was crucial to the rise of the modern Western world, as its influence was as important as those of Hellenistic and Greco-Roman civilizations.

== Types of asceticism and the significance of ancient Judaism ==
Weber noted that some aspects of Christianity sought to conquer and change the world, instead of withdrawing from its imperfections. This fundamental distinctiveness of Christianity (when compared to Eastern religions) stems originally from ancient Jewish prophecy. Weber stated his reasons for investigating ancient Judaism:

For the Jew (...) the social order of the world was conceived to have been turned into the opposite of the one promised for the future, but in the future it was to be overturned so that Jewry could be once again dominant. The world was conceived as neither eternal nor unchangeable, but rather as being created. Its present structure was a product of man's actions, above all those of the Jews, and of God's reaction to them. Hence the world was a historical product designed to give way to the truly God-ordained order [...] There existed in addition a highly rational religious ethic of social conduct; it was free of magic and all forms of irrational quest for salvation; it was inwardly worlds apart from the path of salvation offered by Asiatic religions. To a large extent this ethic still underlies contemporary Middle Eastern and European ethics. World-historical interest in Jewry rests upon this fact. [...] Thus, in considering the conditions of Jewry's evolution, we stand at a turning point of the whole cultural development of the West and the Middle East

== History and social organization of Ancient Israel ==
Weber analysed the interaction between the Bedouins, the cities, the herdsmen and the peasants, the conflicts between them, and the rise and fall of United Monarchy of Israel and Judah. The brief time of United Monarchy divided the period of confederacy since the Exodus and the settlement of the Israelites in Canaan from the period of political decline following the division of the monarchy. Weber discusses the organisation of the early confederacy, the unique qualities of Israelite relations to the God of Israel, the influence of foreign cults, types of religious ecstasy and the struggle of the priests against ecstasy and idol worship. Later he describes the times of the Division of the Monarchy, social aspects of Biblical prophecy, social orientation of the prophets, demagogues and pamphleteers, ecstasy and politics, ethic and theodicity of the Prophets.

Those periods were significant for religious history, as the basic doctrines of Judaism that left their mark on Western civilisation arose during those times.

Reinhard Bendix summarising Weber's work writes:

...free of magic and esoteric speculations, devoted to the study of law, vigiliant in the effort to do what was right in the eyes of the Lord in the hope of a better future, the prophets established a religion of faith that subjected man's daily life to the imperatives of a divinely ordained moral law. In this way, ancient Judaism helped create the moral rationalism of Western civilisation

== See also ==
- Max Weber § External links for websites containing online works of Max Weber.
