= The Religion of China =

1915 book by Max Weber

The Religion of China: Confucianism and Taoism
- Title page for The Religion of China (1951 edition)
- Author: Max Weber
- Original title: Konfuzianismus und Taoismus
- Publication date: 1915

The Religion of China: Confucianism and Taoism is a book written by Max Weber, a German economist and sociologist. It was first published in German under the title Konfuzianismus und Taoismus in 1915 and an adapted version appeared in 1920. An English translation was published in 1951 and several editions have been released since.

It was his second major work on the sociology of religion, after The Protestant Ethic and the Spirit of Capitalism. Weber focused on those aspects of Chinese society that were different from those of Europe and Puritanism, and posed a question why capitalism did not develop in China. From the chronological perspective, he concentrated on early period of Chinese history (Hundred Schools of Thought, Warring States period), during which major Chinese schools of thoughts (Confucianism, Taoism) were invented. In that period, he focused on the issues of Chinese urban development, Chinese patrimonialism and officialdom, and Chinese religion, as the areas in which Chinese development differed most distinctively from the European route.

Weber's choice of topics and analysis inspired further attention and critique. His work has been praised for its ambitious scope and theoretical rigor, but it has also faced criticism for its reliance on Western frameworks to interpret non-Western societies. The sociologist of Chinese religion C.K. Yang, for instance, wrote that Weber's interpretation is "largely the result of viewing the religious situation in Chinese culture from the view of the Christian world, where religion has a formal organizational system and has occupied a prominent structural position in the organizational scheme of Western society."

== Historical background ==
Weber based much of his analysis on the early period of Chinese history. By 200 B.C., the Chinese state had emerged from a loose federation of feudal states of the Warring States period to the unified empire with patrimonal rule. Confucianism emerged to dominate the other schools that had developed in the fertile social upheavals of pre-imperial China such as Daoism (Taoism), Mohism, and Legalism, all of which had criticised Confucianism (c. 400 – c. 200 B.C.). One of Confucius's disciples, Mencius, (c. 372 – c. 289 B.C.) developed a more idealistic version of Confucianism, while Xunzi (Hsün Tzu, c. 313 – c. 238 B.C.) argued that all inclinations are shaped by acquired language and other social forms.

Confucianism rose to the position of an official orthodoxy during the Han dynasty (206 B.C. – A.D. 220).

When the Han disintegrated, Confucianism fell with it and lay dormant for almost 400 years (A.D. 220–618) as Chinese Buddhism and Taoism offered new visions. During this period, Buddhism, which had entered China from India, gained widespread popularity, offering spiritual solace and a new worldview that complemented traditional Chinese thought. China was again unified, by the Sui dynasty (581-618) and by the Tang dynasty (618–906). During the Song (Sung) dynasty (960–1279), Neo-Confucianism emerged interpreting classical Confucian doctrine in a way that addressed Buddhist and Daoist issues. Thinkers like Zhu Xi (1130–1200) played a role in this transformation, emphasizing the importance of moral self-cultivation and the investigation of things (gewu). In the Ming dynasty (1368–1644), Wang Yangming claimed that the mind projects li (principle) onto things rather than just noticing external li. Wang's philosophy, known as the 'School of Mind,' challenged traditional Neo-Confucian thought by asserting that knowledge and morality are rooted in the innate faculties of the mind. In the early 20th-century Chinese intellectuals blamed Confucianism for the scientific and political backwardness of China, after the disastrous conflicts with Western military technology at the dawn of the modern era.

== Cities ==
Similar to Europe, Chinese cities were founded as forts or leader's residences and were the centers of trade and crafts. However, they never received political autonomy and in fact sometimes had fewer rights than villages. Likewise, its citizens had no special political rights or privileges; the resident of Chinese cities never constituted a separate status class like the residents of European cities.

The lack of city development is partially due to strengths of kinship ties, which stems from religious beliefs (in ancestral spirits) and maintaining strong ties to the villages in which one's ancestors lived. The guilds likewise competed against each other for the favour of the Emperor, never uniting in order to fight for more rights.

== Patrimonialism, officialdom and literati ==
Unlike eternally divided Europe, China saw early unification and establishment of imperial government with a centralized officialdom. This unification, achieved under the Qin dynasty (221–206 BCE), laid the foundation for a bureaucratic system that would endure for over two millennia, shaping the political and social fabric of Chinese civilization. Relatively peaceful centuries in the first centuries of Chinese history meant that military never gained significant authority when the power structure was being formed. This meant that the focus of struggle for political power turned from the distribution of land to the distribution of offices, which with their fees and taxes were the most prominent source of income for the holder. The imperial examination system, established during the Sui and Tang dynasties, further institutionalized this shift by selecting officials based on Confucian scholarship rather than aristocratic lineage or military prowess. The state depended on the services of those freely removable and non-hereditary officials, rather than on the service of military (knights), like in Europe. The officialdom nonetheless had significant powers, and its vested interests were in preserving the status quo, opposing any reforms or changes, particularly on a governmental level.

For the members of the officialdom, it was their rank, or status, which was of prime importance. The 'superior' man (literati) should stay away from the pursuit of wealth (though not from the wealth itself). Therefore, becoming a civil servant was preferred to becoming a businessman and granted a much higher status class. Literati did not care about the wealth, although they could and did care about their status. As Weber wrote:

...the "superior" man coveted... a position, not a profit.

== Religious organization and the Confucian orthodoxy ==
Chinese civilization had no religious prophecy nor a powerful priesthood social class. The emperor was the high priest of the state religion and the supreme ruler. Weber emphasized that Confucianism tolerated the simultaneous existence of many popular cults and made no effort to organize them as part of a religious doctrine, while nonetheless curtailing the political ambitions of their priests. Instead it taught adjustment to the world.

This forms a sharp contrast with medieval Europe, where the Church was often able to superimpose its will over those of secular rulers, and where the same, singular religion was the religion of rulers, nobility and the common folk. In Europe, the Catholic Church wielded significant political and spiritual authority, often challenging the power of kings and emperors, while in China, religious authority was subordinated to the imperial state. The Chinese model of governance, with its integration of religious and political authority under the emperor, created a system where religion served the state rather than competing with it.

== State cult and popular religiosity ==
According to Confucianism, the worship of great deities was the affair of the state, ancestral worship is required of all, and a multitude of popular cults are tolerable. Confucianism tolerated magic and mysticism as long as they were useful tools for controlling the masses; it denounced them as heresy and suppressed them when they threatened the established order (hence the opposition to Buddhism). Another notable quality was the avoidance of both irrational ecstasy and excitement, as well as mystic contemplation and metaphysical speculation.

Note that in this context Confucianism can be referred to as the state cult, and Taoism as the popular religion.

== Social structure and the capitalist economy ==
Weber argued that, while several factors were good for development of a capitalist economy (long periods of peace, improved control of rivers, population growth, freedom to acquire land and move outside of native community, freedom of choosing the occupation), they were outweighed by others (mostly stemming from religion) in China:

- technical inventions were opposed on the basis of religion (disturbance of ancestral spirits leading to bad luck), instead of changing the world, adjusting oneself to it was preferred. This emphasis on harmony with the natural and spiritual world, rooted in Confucian and Daoist thought, discouraged the kind of technological innovation that drove industrialization in the West.
- sale of land was often prohibited or made very difficult
- extended kinship groups (based on religion stressing the importance of family ties and ancestry) protected its members against economic adversities, therefore negatively affecting one's motivation for payment of debts and work discipline
- those kinship prevented the development of urban status class, hindered legal developments like creation of legal institutions, codification of laws and a jurist status class.

== Confucianism and Puritanism ==
According to Weber, Confucianism and Puritanism are mutually exclusive types of rational thought, each attempting to prescribe a way of life based on religious dogma. Notably, they both valued self-control and restraint, and did not oppose accumulation of wealth.

However, to both those qualities where just means to the final goal, and here they were divided by a key difference. The Confucianism goal was "a cultured status position", while Puritanism's goal was to create individuals who are "tools of God". The intensity of belief and enthusiasm for action were rare in Confucianism, but common in Protestantism. Actively working for wealth was unbecoming a proper Confucian. Therefore, Weber states that it was this difference in social attitudes and mentality, shaped by the respective, dominant religions, that contributed to the development of capitalism in the West and the absence of it in China.

== Influence and evaluations ==
The sociologist Andreas Buss wrote in 1985 that many Western scholars felt the so-called "Weber-thesis" belonged to a "bygone era" yet it continued to inspire discussion and reference. He cautioned that English language scholars would find it difficult to read Weber. One problem is that Weber did not intend the essays on China and India to be read separately or as definitive treatments. His purpose was to sketch selected elements in Indian or Chinese culture to contrast with and test his essay "The Protestant Ethic and the Rise of Capitalism." The essay on Confucianism and Taoism was published in English under the "misleading" title, The Religion of China, a title which does "not at all reflect Weber's intentions". In addition, Buss continued, the translations are of "poor quality", even a "disgrace", and add to the misunderstanding that Weber over-generalized.

== See also ==
- Sociology of religion
- The Religion of India
- Ancient Judaism

== References and further reading ==
- Buss, Andreas E. (1985), "Introduction", in Buss, Andreas E. (ed.), Max Weber and Asia: Contributions to the Sociology of Development, München: Weltforum Verlag, pp. 1–16, ISBN 3-8039-0314-9
- Eisenstadt, Shmuel Noah (1985). "This Worldly Transcendentalism and the Structuring of the World: Weber's Religion of China and the Format of Chinese History and Civilization". Journal of Developing Societies. 1 (2): 168. ProQuest 1307834348.
- Hamilton, Gary G. (1985). "Why No Capitalism in China? Negative Questions in Historical, Comparative Research". Max Weber in Asian Studies. pp. 65–89. doi:10.1163/9789004477339_006. ISBN 978-90-04-47733-9.
- Bendix, Reinhard (1977). Max Weber: An Intellectual Portrait. University of California Press. ISBN 978-0-520-03194-4.
- Van Der Sprenkel, Otto B (1964). "Max Weber on China". History and Theory. 3 (3): 348–370. doi:10.2307/2504237. JSTOR 2504237.
- Yang, C.K., "Introduction," to Max Weber, translated by Hans H. Gerth, The Religion of China: Confucianism and Taoism (New York: Macmillan, 1951).
- Yang, C. K. (1961). Religion in Chinese Society: A Study of Contemporary Social Functions of Religion and Some of Their Historical Factors. University of California Press. ISBN 978-0-520-01371-1.
- Van Ess, Hans (2020). "Konfuzianismus und Taoismus (1915; 1920)". Max Weber-Handbuch. pp. 317–323. doi:10.1007/978-3-476-05142-4_70. ISBN 978-3-476-05141-7.
- Sun, Anna (4 December 2020). "Confucianism and Daoism: From Max Weber to the Present". Review of Religion and Chinese Society. 7 (2): 161–163. doi:10.1163/22143955-00702001.
