= Sociology =

Scientific study of human society and relationships

Sociology is the scientific study of human society that focuses on human social behaviour, patterns of social relationships, social interaction, and aspects of culture associated with everyday life. The term sociology was coined in the late 18th century to describe the scientific study of society. As a social science, sociology uses various methods of empirical investigation and critical analysis to develop a body of knowledge about social order and social change. Sociological subject matter ranges from micro-level analyses of individual interaction and agency to macro-level analyses of social systems and social structure. Applied sociological research may be directed toward social policy and welfare, whereas theoretical approaches may focus on understanding social processes and the phenomenological method.

Traditional focuses of sociology include social stratification, social class, social mobility, religion, secularization, law, sexuality, gender, race, social norms, and deviance. Recent studies have added socio-technical aspects of the digital divide as a new focus. Digital sociology examines the impact of digital technologies on social behaviour and institutions, encompassing professional, analytical, critical, and public dimensions. The internet has reshaped social networks and power relations, illustrating the growing importance of digital sociology. As all spheres of human activity are affected by the interplay between social structure and individual agency, sociology has gradually expanded its focus to other subjects and institutions, such as health and the institution of medicine; economy; military; punishment and systems of control; the Internet; sociology of education; social capital; and the role of social activity in the development of scientific knowledge.

The range of social scientific methods has also expanded, as social researchers draw upon a variety of qualitative and quantitative techniques. The linguistic and cultural turns of the mid-20th century, in particular, have led to increasingly interpretative, hermeneutic, and philosophical approaches to the analysis of society. Conversely, the turn of the 21st century has seen the rise of new analytically, mathematically, and computationally rigorous techniques, such as agent-based modelling and social network analysis.

Social research influences various industries and sectors of life, such as among politicians, policy makers, and legislators; educators; planners; administrators; developers; business magnates and managers; social workers; non-governmental organizations; and non-profit organizations, as well as individuals interested in resolving social issues in general.

== History ==
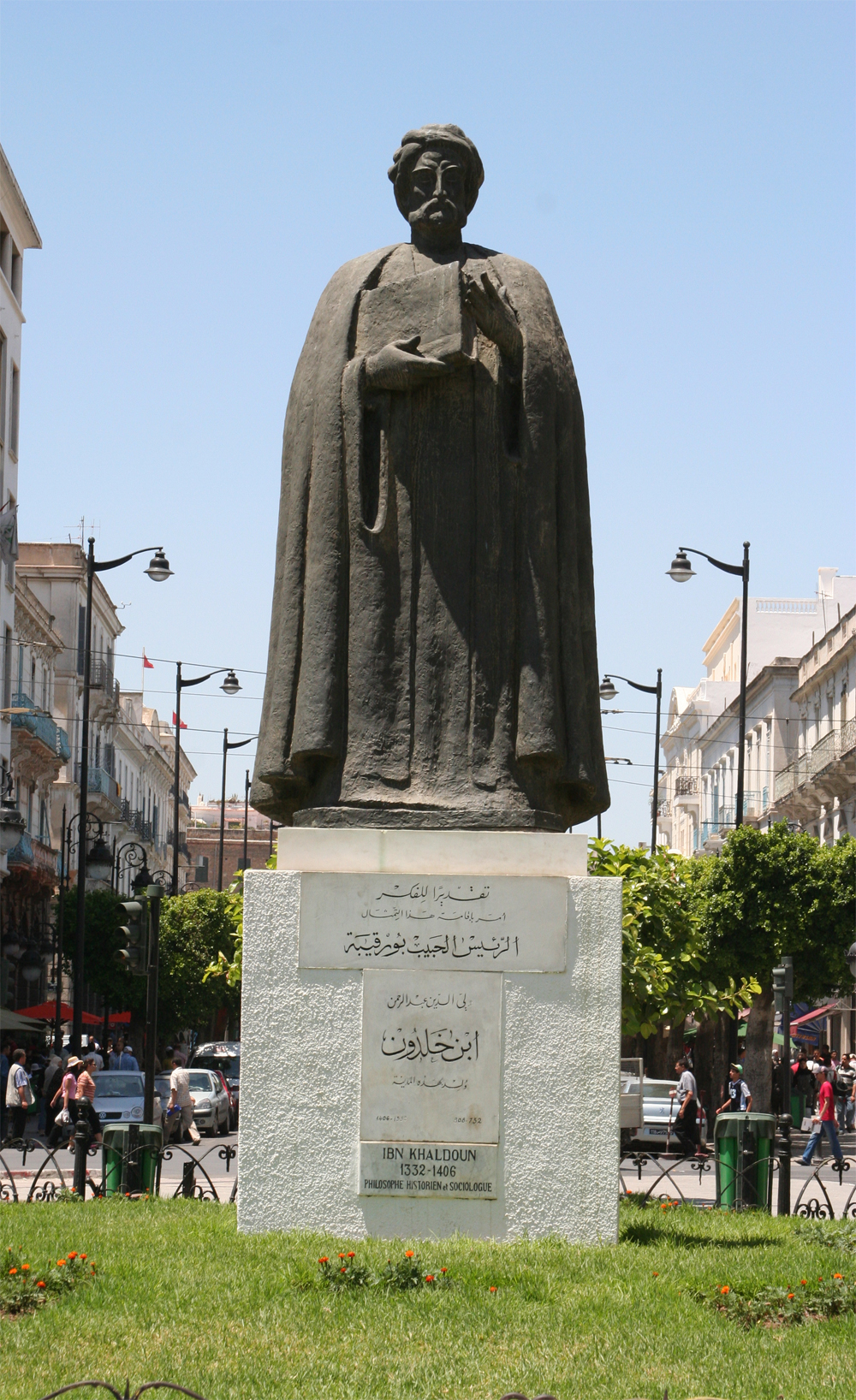
Ibn Khaldun statue in Tunis, Tunisia (1332–1406)

Sociological reasoning predates the foundation of the discipline itself. Social analysis has origins in the common stock of universal, global knowledge and philosophy, having been carried out as far back as the time of old comic poetry which features social and political criticism, and ancient Greek philosophers Socrates, Plato, and Aristotle. For instance, the origin of the survey can be traced back to at least the Domesday Book in 1086, while ancient philosophers such as Confucius wrote about the importance of social roles.

Medieval Arabic writings encompass a rich tradition that offers early insights into sociology. Some sources consider Ibn Khaldun, a 14th-century Muslim scholar from Tunisia, (Note: See Branches of the early Islamic philosophy.) to have been the father of sociology, although there is no reference to his work in the writings of European contributors to modern sociology. Khaldun's Muqaddimah was considered to be amongst the first works to advance social-scientific reasoning on social cohesion and social conflict.

=== Etymology ===
The word sociology derives part of its name from the Latin word socius ('companion' or 'fellowship'). The suffix -logy ('the study of') comes from that of the Greek -λογία, derived from λόγος (lógos, 'word' or 'knowledge').

The term sociology was first coined in 1780 by the French essayist Emmanuel-Joseph Sieyès in an unpublished manuscript. (Note: See also Fauré, Christine, and Jacques Guilhaumou. 2006. "Sieyès et le non-dit de la sociologie: du mot à la chose." Revue d'histoire des sciences humaines 15. Naissances de la science sociale. See also the article 'sociologie' in the French-language Wikipedia.) Sociology was later defined independently by French philosopher of science Auguste Comte (1798–1857) in 1838 as a new way of looking at society. Comte had earlier used the term social physics, but it had been subsequently appropriated by others, most notably the Belgian statistician Adolphe Quetelet. Comte endeavoured to unify history, psychology, and economics through the scientific understanding of social life. Writing shortly after the malaise of the French Revolution, he proposed that social ills could be remedied through sociological positivism, an epistemological approach outlined in the Course in Positive Philosophy (1830–1842), later included in A General View of Positivism (1848). Comte believed a positivist stage would mark the final era in the progression of human understanding, after conjectural theological and metaphysical phases. In observing the circular dependence of theory and observation in science, and having classified the sciences, Comte may be regarded as the first philosopher of science in the modern sense of the term.

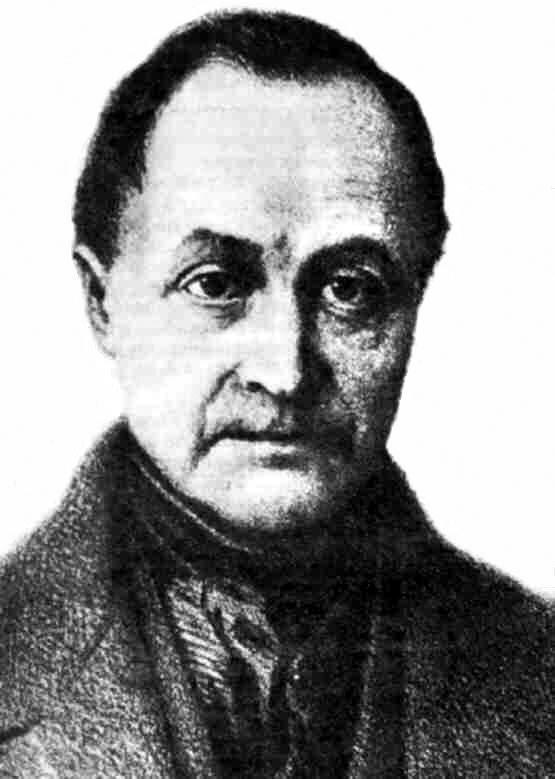
Auguste Comte (1798–1857)

Comte gave a powerful impetus to the development of sociology, an impetus that bore fruit in the later decades of the nineteenth century. To say this is certainly not to claim that French sociologists such as Durkheim were devoted disciples of the high priest of positivism. But by insisting on the irreducibility of each of his basic sciences to the particular science of sciences which it presupposed in the hierarchy and by emphasizing the nature of sociology as the scientific study of social phenomena Comte put sociology on the map. To be sure, [its] beginnings can be traced back well beyond Montesquieu, for example, and to Condorcet, not to speak of Saint-Simon, Comte's immediate predecessor. But Comte's clear recognition of sociology as a particular science, with a character of its own, justified Durkheim in regarding him as the father or founder of this science, even though Durkheim did not accept the idea of the three states and criticized Comte's approach to sociology.

— Frederick Copleston, A History of Philosophy: IX Modern Philosophy (1974), p. 118

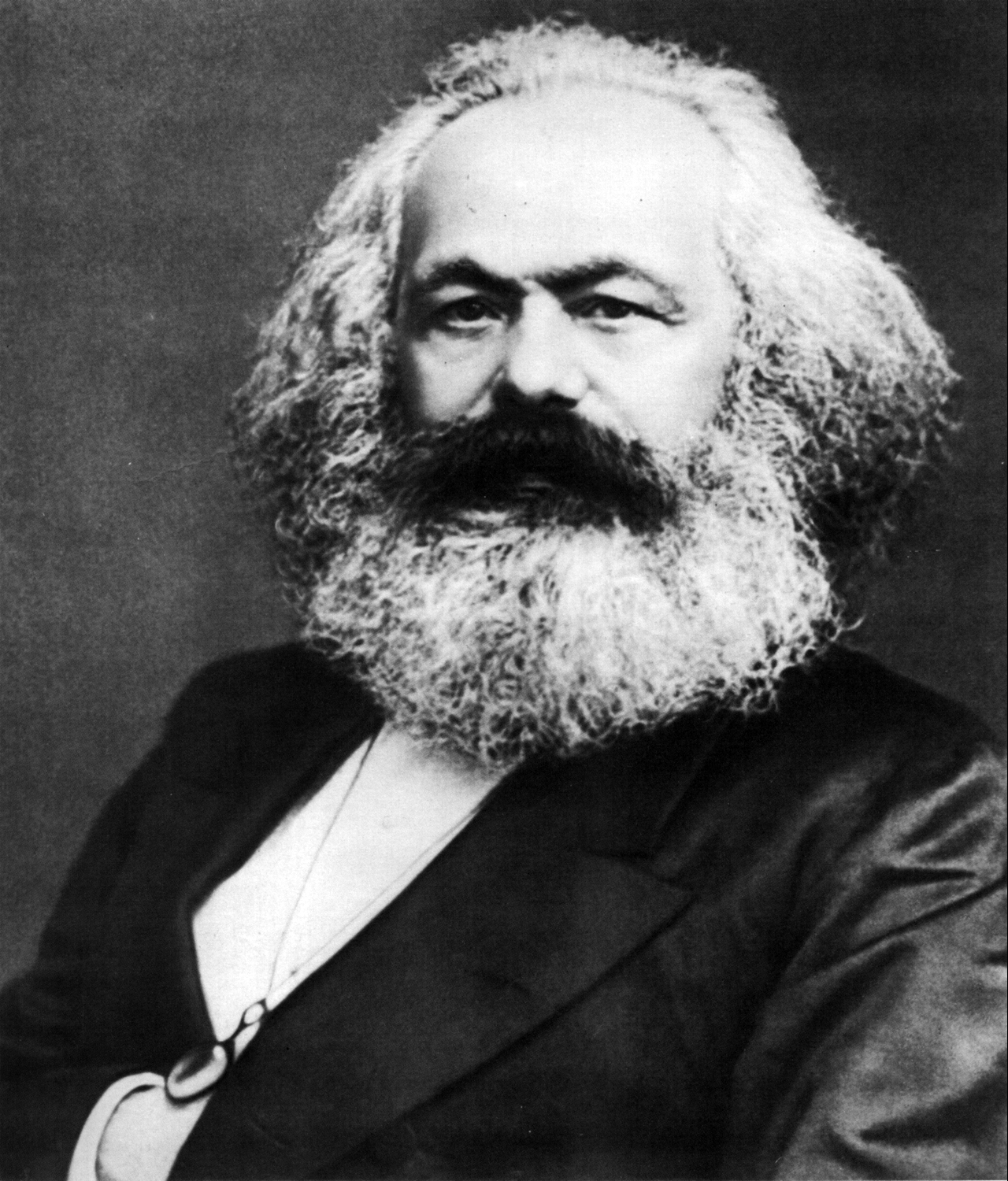
Karl Marx (1818–1883)

=== Marx ===
Both Comte and Karl Marx set out to develop scientifically justified systems in the wake of European industrialization and secularization, informed by key movements in the philosophies of history and science. Marx rejected Comtean positivism but in attempting to develop a "science of society" nevertheless came to be recognized as a founder of sociology as the word gained wider meaning. For Isaiah Berlin, even though Marx did not consider himself to be a sociologist, he may be regarded as the "true father" of modern sociology, "in so far as anyone can claim the title".

=== Spencer ===
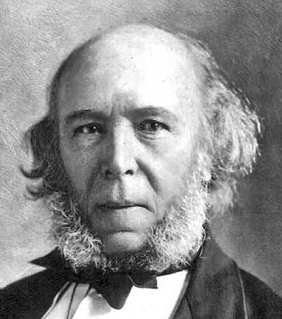
Herbert Spencer (1820–1903)

Herbert Spencer was one of the most popular and influential 19th-century sociologists. It is estimated that he sold one million books in his lifetime, far more than any other sociologist at the time. So strong was his influence that many other 19th-century thinkers, including Émile Durkheim, defined their ideas in relation to his. Durkheim's Division of Labour in Society is to a large extent an extended debate with Spencer, from whose sociology Durkheim borrowed extensively.

Also a notable biologist, Spencer coined the term survival of the fittest. While Marxian ideas defined one strand of sociology, Spencer was a critic of socialism, as well as a strong advocate for a laissez-faire style of government. His ideas were closely observed by conservative political circles, especially in the United States and England.

=== Foundations of the academic discipline ===
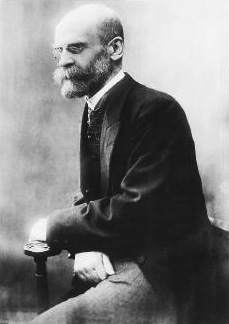
Émile Durkheim

The first formal Department of Sociology in the world was established in 1892 by Albion Small—from the invitation of William Rainey Harper—at the University of Chicago. The American Journal of Sociology was founded shortly thereafter in 1895 by Small as well. The first scientific school of sociology, the Atlanta Sociological Laboratory, was founded at Atlanta University in 1896 by W. E. B. Du Bois.

The institutionalization of sociology as an academic discipline, however, was chiefly led by Émile Durkheim, who developed positivism as a foundation for practical social research. While Durkheim rejected much of the detail of Comte's philosophy, he retained and refined its method, maintaining that the social sciences are a logical continuation of the natural ones into the realm of human activity, and insisting that they may retain the same objectivity, rationalism, and approach to causality. Durkheim set up the first European department of sociology at the University of Bordeaux in 1895, publishing his Rules of the Sociological Method (1895). For Durkheim, sociology could be described as the "science of institutions, their genesis and their functioning".

Durkheim's monograph Suicide (1897) is considered a seminal work in statistical analysis by contemporary sociologists. Suicide is a case study of variations in suicide rates among Catholic and Protestant populations, and served to distinguish sociological analysis from psychology or philosophy. It also marked a major contribution to the theoretical concept of structural functionalism. By carefully examining suicide statistics in different police districts, he attempted to demonstrate that Catholic communities have a lower suicide rate than that of Protestants, something he attributed to social (as opposed to individual or psychological) causes. He developed the notion of objective social facts to delineate a distinct empirical object for sociology to study. Through such studies, he posited that sociology would be able to determine whether any given society is healthy or pathological, and seek social reform to negate organic breakdown, or "social anomie".

Sociology quickly evolved as an academic response to the perceived challenges of modernity, such as industrialization, urbanization, secularization, and rationalization. The field predominated in continental Europe, with British anthropology and statistics generally following on a separate trajectory. By the turn of the 20th century, however, many theorists were active in the English-speaking world. Few early sociologists were confined strictly to the subject, interacting also with economics, jurisprudence, psychology, and philosophy, with theories being appropriated in a variety of different fields. Since its inception, sociological epistemology, methods, and frames of inquiry have significantly expanded and diverged.

Durkheim, Marx, and the German theorist Max Weber are typically cited as the three principal architects of sociology. W. E. B. Du Bois is typically cited as the father of urban and American sociology. Herbert Spencer, William Graham Sumner, Lester F. Ward, Vilfredo Pareto, Alexis de Tocqueville, Werner Sombart, Thorstein Veblen, Ferdinand Tönnies, Georg Simmel, Jane Addams and Karl Mannheim are often included on academic curricula as founding theorists. Curricula also may include Charlotte Perkins Gilman, Marianne Weber, Harriet Martineau, and Friedrich Engels as founders of the feminist tradition in sociology; and Ida B. Wells-Barnett and Anna Julia Cooper as pioneers of Black Feminist Sociology. Each key figure is associated with a particular theoretical perspective and orientation.

=== Further developments ===
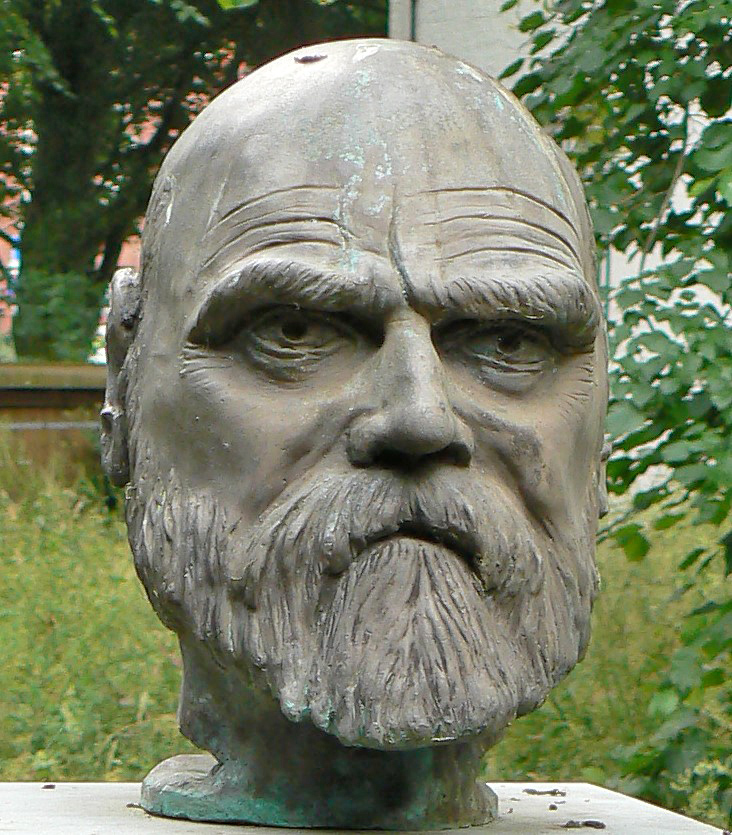
Bust of Ferdinand Tönnies in Husum, Germany

The first college course entitled "Sociology" was taught in the United States at Yale in 1875 by William Graham Sumner. In 1883, Lester F. Ward, who later became the first president of the American Sociological Association (ASA), published Dynamic Sociology—Or Applied social science as based upon statical sociology and the less complex sciences, attacking the laissez-faire sociology of Herbert Spencer and Sumner. Ward's 1,200-page book was used as core material in many early American sociology courses. In 1890, the oldest continuing American course in the modern tradition began at the University of Kansas, lectured by Frank W. Blackmar. The Department of Sociology at the University of Chicago was established in 1892 by Albion Small, who also published the first sociology textbook: An introduction to the study of society. George Herbert Mead and Charles Cooley, who had met at the University of Michigan in 1891 (along with John Dewey), moved to Chicago in 1894. Their influence gave rise to social psychology and the symbolic interactionism of the modern Chicago School. The American Journal of Sociology was founded in 1895, followed by the ASA in 1905.

The sociological canon of classics with Durkheim and Max Weber at the top owes its existence in part to Talcott Parsons, who is largely credited with introducing both to American audiences. Parsons consolidated the sociological tradition and set the agenda for American sociology at the point of its fastest disciplinary growth. Sociology in the United States was less historically influenced by Marxism than its European counterpart, and to this day broadly remains more statistical in its approach.

The first sociology department established in the United Kingdom was at the London School of Economics and Political Science (home of the British Journal of Sociology) in 1904. Leonard Trelawny Hobhouse and Edvard Westermarck became the lecturers in the discipline at the University of London in 1907. Harriet Martineau, an English translator of Comte, has been cited as the first female sociologist. In 1909, the German Sociological Association was founded by Ferdinand Tönnies, Max Weber, and Georg Simmel, among others. Weber established the first department in Germany at LMU Munich in 1919, having presented an influential new antipositivist sociology. In 1920, Florian Znaniecki set up the first department in Poland. The Institute for Social Research at the University of Frankfurt (later to become the Frankfurt School of critical theory) was founded in 1923. International co-operation in sociology began in 1893, when René Worms founded the Institut International de Sociologie, an institution later eclipsed by the much larger International Sociological Association (ISA), founded in 1949.

== Theoretical traditions ==
Three stages of Sociology

=== Positivism and anti-positivism ===
==== Positivism ====
The overarching methodological principle of positivism is to conduct sociology in broadly the same manner as natural science. An emphasis on empiricism and the scientific method is sought to provide a tested foundation for sociological research, based on the assumption that the only authentic knowledge is scientific, and that such knowledge can only be obtained through positive affirmation via scientific methodology.

Our main goal is to extend scientific rationalism to human conduct.... What has been called our positivism is but a consequence of this rationalism.

— Émile Durkheim, The Rules of Sociological Method (1895)

The term has long since ceased to carry this meaning; there are no fewer than twelve distinct epistemologies that are referred to as positivism. Many of these approaches do not self-identify as "positivist", some because they themselves arose in opposition to older forms of positivism, and some because the label has over time become a pejorative term by being mistakenly linked with a theoretical empiricism. The extent of antipositivist criticism has also diverged, with many rejecting the scientific method and others only seeking to amend it to reflect 20th-century developments in the philosophy of science. However, positivism (broadly understood as a scientific approach to the study of society) remains dominant in contemporary sociology, especially in the United States.

Loïc Wacquant distinguishes three major strains of positivism: Durkheimian, Logical, and Instrumental. None of these is the same as that set forth by Comte, who was unique in advocating such a rigid (and perhaps optimistic) version. While Émile Durkheim rejected much of the detail of Comte's philosophy, he retained and refined its method. Durkheim maintained that the social sciences are a logical continuation of the natural ones into the realm of human activity, and insisted that they should retain the same objectivity, rationalism, and approach to causality. He developed the notion of objective sui generis "social facts" to serve as unique empirical objects for the science of sociology to study.

The variety of positivism that remains dominant today is termed instrumental positivism. This approach eschews epistemological and metaphysical concerns (such as the nature of social facts) in favour of methodological clarity, replicability, reliability and validity. This positivism is more or less synonymous with quantitative research, and so only resembles older positivism in practice. Since it carries no explicit philosophical commitment, its practitioners may not belong to any particular school of thought. Modern sociology of this type is often credited to Paul Lazarsfeld, who pioneered large-scale survey studies and developed statistical techniques for analysing them. This approach lends itself to what Robert K. Merton called middle-range theory: abstract statements that generalize from segregated hypotheses and empirical regularities rather than starting with an abstract idea of a social whole.

==== Antipositivism ====
The German philosopher Hegel criticized traditional empiricist epistemology, which he rejected as uncritical, and determinism, which he viewed as overly mechanistic. Karl Marx's methodology borrowed from Hegelian dialecticism, but also a rejection of positivism in favour of critical analysis, seeking to supplement the empirical acquisition of "facts" with the elimination of illusions. He maintained that appearances need to be critiqued rather than documented. Early hermeneuticians such as Wilhelm Dilthey pioneered the distinction between natural and social science ('Geisteswissenschaft'). Various neo-Kantian philosophers, phenomenologists and human scientists further theorized how the analysis of the social world differs to that of the natural world due to the irreducibly complex aspects of human society, culture, and being.

In the Italian context of the development of the social sciences and of sociology in particular, there are oppositions to the first foundation of the discipline, sustained by speculative philosophies and by the anti-scientific tendencies that had matured through the critique of positivism and evolutionism, and a progressive tradition struggles to establish itself.

At the turn of the 20th century, the first generation of German sociologists formally introduced methodological anti-positivism, proposing that research should concentrate on human cultural norms, values, symbols, and social processes viewed from a resolutely subjective perspective. Max Weber argued that sociology may be loosely described as a science as it can identify causal relationships of human "social action"—especially among "ideal types", or hypothetical simplifications of complex social phenomena. As a non-positivist, however, Weber sought relationships that are not as "historical, invariant, or generalisable" as those pursued by natural scientists. Fellow German sociologist, Ferdinand Tönnies, theorized on two crucial abstract concepts with his work on "gemeinschaft and gesellschaft" (lit. 'community' and 'society'). Tönnies marked a sharp line between the realm of concepts and the reality of social action: the first must be treated axiomatically and in a deductive way ("pure sociology"), whereas the second empirically and inductively ("applied sociology").

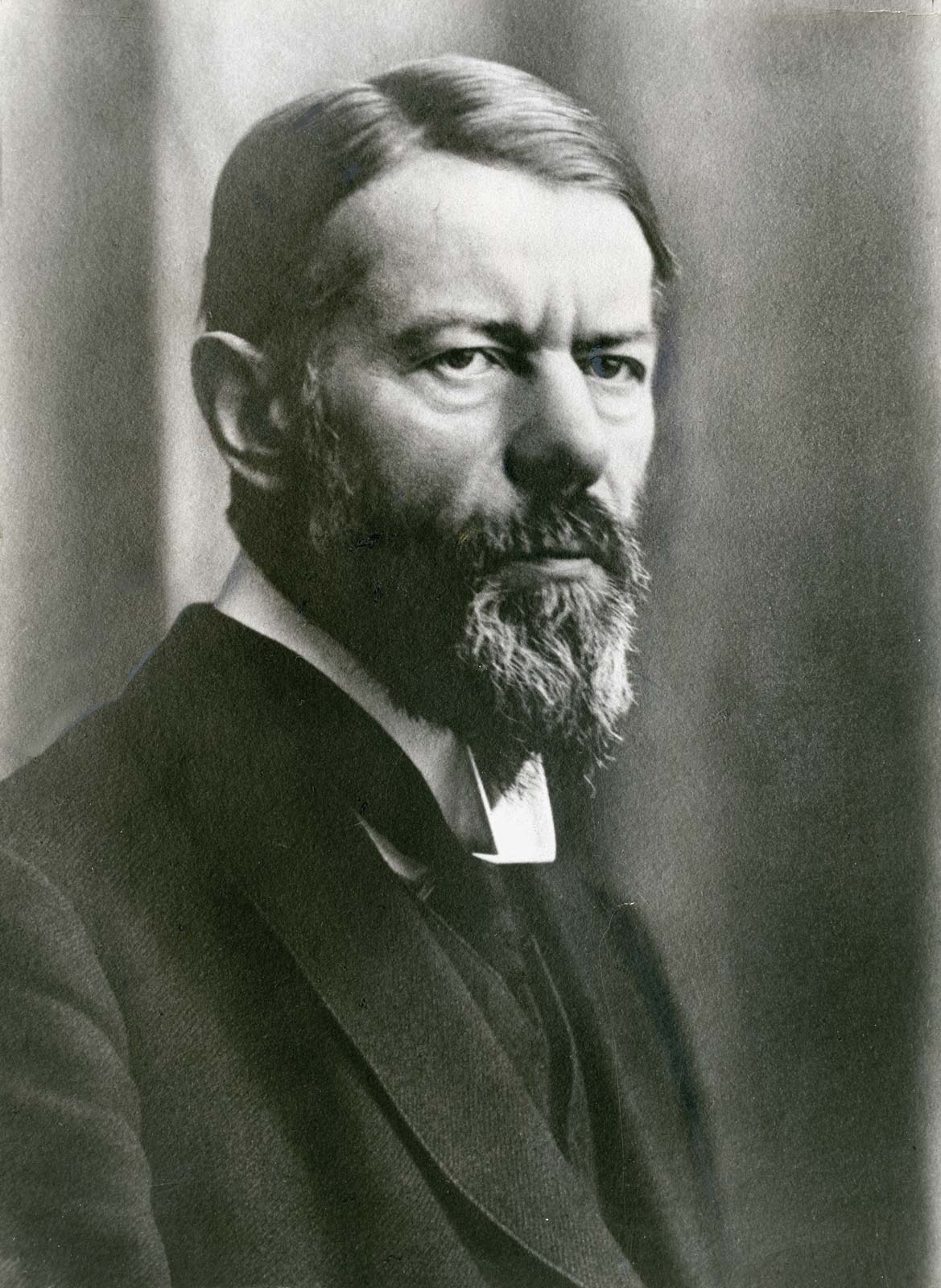
Max Weber in 1918

[Sociology is] ... the science whose object is to interpret the meaning of social action and thereby give a causal explanation of the way in which the action proceeds and the effects which it produces. By 'action' in this definition is meant the human behaviour when and to the extent that the agent or agents see it as subjectively meaningful ... the meaning to which we refer may be either (a) the meaning actually intended either by an individual agent on a particular historical occasion or by a number of agents on an approximate average in a given set of cases, or (b) the meaning attributed to the agent or agents, as types, in a pure type constructed in the abstract. In neither case is the 'meaning' to be thought of as somehow objectively 'correct' or 'true' by some metaphysical criterion. This is the difference between the empirical sciences of action, such as sociology and history, and any kind of prior discipline, such as jurisprudence, logic, ethics, or aesthetics, whose aim is to extract from their subject-matter 'correct' or 'valid' meaning.

— Max Weber, The Nature of Social Action (1922), p. 7

Both Weber and Georg Simmel pioneered the "Verstehen" (or 'interpretative') method in social science; a systematic process by which an outside observer attempts to relate to a particular cultural group, or indigenous people, on their own terms and from their own point of view. Through the work of Simmel, in particular, sociology acquired a possible character beyond positivist data-collection or grand, deterministic systems of structural law. Relatively isolated from the sociological academy throughout his lifetime, Simmel presented idiosyncratic analyses of modernity more reminiscent of the phenomenological and existential writers than of Comte or Durkheim, paying particular concern to the forms of, and possibilities for, social individuality. His sociology engaged in a neo-Kantian inquiry into the limits of perception, asking 'What is society?' in a direct allusion to Kant's question 'What is nature?'

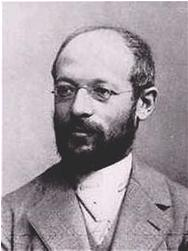
Georg Simmel

=== Classical theory ===
The contemporary discipline of sociology is theoretically multi-paradigmatic in line with the contentions of classical social theory. Randall Collins' well-cited survey of sociological theory retroactively labels various theorists as belonging to four theoretical traditions: functionalism, conflict, symbolic interactionism, and utilitarianism.

Accordingly, modern sociological theory predominantly descends from functionalist (Durkheim) and conflict (Marx and Weber) approaches to social structure, as well as from symbolic-interactionist approaches to social interaction, such as micro-level structural (Simmel) and pragmatist (Mead, Cooley) perspectives. Utilitarianism (also known as rational choice or social exchange and distinct from utilitarianism in ethics), although often associated with economics, is an established tradition within sociological theory.

Lastly, as argued by Raewyn Connell, a tradition that is often forgotten is that of Social Darwinism, which applies the logic of Darwinian biological evolution to people and societies. This tradition often aligns with classical functionalism, and was once the dominant theoretical stance in American sociology, from c. 1881 – c. 1915, associated with several founders of sociology, primarily Herbert Spencer, Lester F. Ward, and William Graham Sumner.

Contemporary sociological theory retains traces of each of these traditions, and they are by no means mutually exclusive.

==== Functionalism ====
A broad historical paradigm in both sociology and anthropology, functionalism addresses the social structure—referred to as "social organization" by the classical theorists—with respect to the whole and the necessary functions of its constituent elements. A common analogy (popularized by Herbert Spencer) is to regard norms and institutions as 'organs' that work towards the proper functioning of the entire 'body' of society. The perspective was implicit in the original sociological positivism of Comte but was theorized in full by Durkheim, again with respect to observable, structural laws.

Functionalism also has an anthropological basis in the work of theorists such as Marcel Mauss, Bronisław Malinowski, and Radcliffe-Brown. It is in the latter's specific usage that the prefix "structural" emerged. Classical functionalist theory is generally united by its tendency towards biological analogy and notions of social evolutionism, in that the basic form of society would increase in complexity. Those forms of social organization that promoted solidarity would eventually overcome social disorganization. As Giddens states:

Functionalist thought, from Comte onwards, has looked particularly towards biology as the science providing the closest and most compatible model for social science. Biology has been taken to provide a guide to conceptualizing the structure and the function of social systems and to analyzing processes of evolution via mechanisms of adaptation. Functionalism strongly emphasizes the pre-eminence of the social world over its individual parts (i.e. its constituent actors, human subjects).

==== Conflict theory ====
Functionalist theories emphasize "cohesive systems" and are often contrasted with "conflict theories", which critique the overarching socio-political system or emphasize the inequality between particular groups. The following quotes from Durkheim and Marx epitomize the political, as well as theoretical, disparities between functionalist and conflict thought, respectively:

To aim for a civilization beyond that made possible by the nexus of the surrounding environment will result in unloosing sickness into the very society we live in. Collective activity cannot be encouraged beyond the point set by the condition of the social organism without undermining health.

— Émile Durkheim, The Division of Labour in Society (1893)

The history of all hitherto existing society is the history of class struggles. Freeman and slave, patrician and plebeian, lord and serf, guild-master and journeyman, in a word, oppressor and oppressed, stood in constant opposition to one another, carried on an uninterrupted, now hidden, now open fight, a fight that each time ended, either in a revolutionary re-constitution of society at large, or in the common ruin of the contending classes.

— Karl Marx & Friedrich Engels, The Communist Manifesto (1848)

==== Symbolic interactionism ====
Symbolic interaction—often associated with interactionism, phenomenology, dramaturgy, interpretivism—is a sociological approach that places emphasis on subjective meanings and the empirical unfolding of social processes, generally accessed through micro-analysis. This tradition emerged in the Chicago School of the 1920s and 1930s, which, before World War II, "had been the center of sociological research and graduate study". The approach focuses on creating a framework for building a theory that sees society as the product of the everyday interactions of individuals. Society is nothing more than the shared reality that people construct as they interact with one another. This approach views people interacting in countless settings, using symbolic communication to accomplish the tasks at hand. Therefore, society is a complex, ever-changing mosaic of subjective meanings. Some critics of this approach argue that it only looks at what is happening in a particular social situation, and disregards the effects that culture, race or gender (i.e. social-historical structures) may have in that situation. Some important sociologists associated with this approach include Max Weber, George Herbert Mead, Erving Goffman, George Homans, and Peter Blau. It is also in this tradition that the radical-empirical approach of ethnomethodology emerges from the work of Harold Garfinkel.

==== Utilitarianism ====
In normative ethics, utilitarianism is a consequentialist theory that prescribes actions that maximize overall welfare. But in sociology, utilitarianism often refers instead to the exchange theory or the rational choice theory. In this sense, the utilitarian tradition tends to privilege the agency of individual rational actors and to model individuals as seeking to maximize the satisfaction of their preferences. As argued by Josh Whitford, rational actors are assumed to have four basic elements:

1. "a knowledge of alternatives";
2. "a knowledge of, or beliefs about the consequences of the various alternatives";
3. "an ordering of preferences over outcomes"; and
4. "a decision rule, to select among the possible alternatives"

Exchange theory is specifically attributed to the work of George C. Homans, Peter Blau and Richard Emerson. Organizational sociologists James G. March and Herbert A. Simon noted that an individual's rationality is bounded by the context or organizational setting. The utilitarian perspective in sociology was, most notably, revitalized in the late 20th century by the work of former ASA president James Coleman.

=== 20th-century social theory ===
Following the decline of sociocultural evolution theories in the United States, interactionist thought from the Chicago School came to dominate American sociology. As Anselm Strauss describes, "we didn't think symbolic interaction was a perspective in sociology; we thought it was sociology." Moreover, philosophical and psychological pragmatism grounded this tradition. After World War II, mainstream sociology shifted to the survey-research of Paul Lazarsfeld at Columbia University and the general theorizing of Pitirim Sorokin, followed by Talcott Parsons at Harvard University. Ultimately, "the failure of the Chicago, Columbia, and Wisconsin [sociology] departments to produce a significant number of graduate students interested in and committed to general theory in the years 1936–45 was to the advantage of the Harvard department." As Parsons began to dominate general theory, his work primarily referenced European sociology—almost entirely omitting citations of both the American tradition of sociocultural-evolution as well as pragmatism. In addition to Parsons' revision of the sociological canon (which included Marshall, Pareto, Weber, and Durkheim), the lack of theoretical challenges from other departments nurtured the rise of the Parsonian structural-functionalist movement, which reached its crescendo in the 1950s, but by the 1960s was in rapid decline.

By the 1980s, most functionalist perspectives in Europe had broadly been replaced by conflict-oriented approaches, and to many in the discipline, functionalism was considered "as dead as a dodo:" According to Giddens:

The orthodox consensus terminated in the late 1960s and 1970s as the middle ground shared by otherwise competing perspectives gave way. A baffling variety of competing perspectives replaced them. This third 'generation' of social theory includes phenomenologically inspired approaches, critical theory, ethnomethodology, symbolic interactionism, structuralism, post-structuralism, and theories written in the tradition of hermeneutics and ordinary language philosophy.

==== Pax Wisconsana ====
While some conflict approaches also gained popularity in the United States, the mainstream of the discipline instead shifted to a variety of empirically oriented middle-range theories with no single overarching, or "grand", theoretical orientation. John Levi Martin refers to this "golden age of methodological unity and theoretical calm" as the Pax Wisconsana, as it reflected the composition of the sociology department at the University of Wisconsin–Madison: numerous scholars working on separate projects with little contention. Omar Lizardo describes the pax wisconsana as "a Midwestern flavored, Mertonian resolution of the theory/method wars in which [sociologists] all agreed on at least two working hypotheses: (1) grand theory is a waste of time; [and] (2) good theory has to be good to think with or goes in the trash bin". Despite the aversion to grand theory in the latter half of the 20th century, several new traditions have emerged that propose various syntheses: structuralism, post-structuralism, cultural sociology, and systems theory. Some sociologists have called for a return to 'grand theory' to combat the rise of scientific and pragmatist influences within the tradition of sociological thought (see Duane Rousselle).

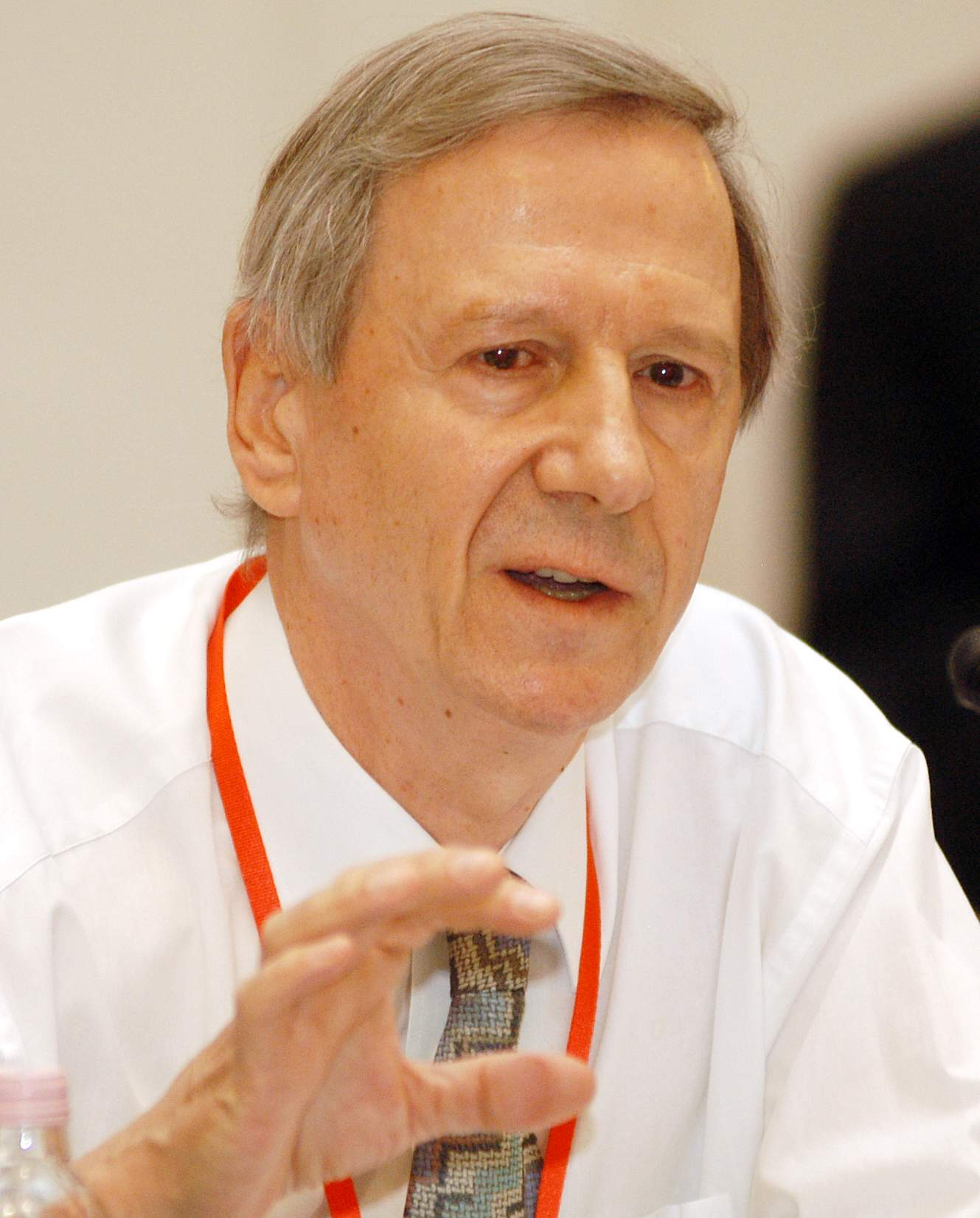
Anthony Giddens

==== Structuralism ====
The structuralist movement originated primarily from the work of Durkheim as interpreted by two European scholars: Anthony Giddens, a sociologist, whose theory of structuration draws on the linguistic theory of Ferdinand de Saussure; and Claude Lévi-Strauss, an anthropologist. In this context, 'structure' does not refer to 'social structure', but to the semiotic understanding of human culture as a system of signs. One may delineate four central tenets of structuralism:

1. Structure is what determines the structure of a whole.
2. Structuralists believe that every system has a structure.
3. Structuralists are interested in 'structural' laws that deal with coexistence rather than changes.
4. Structures are the 'real things' beneath the surface or the appearance of meaning.

The second tradition of structuralist thought, contemporaneous with Giddens, emerges from the American School of social network analysis in the 1970s and 1980s, spearheaded by the Harvard Department of Social Relations led by Harrison White and his students. This tradition of structuralist thought argues that, rather than semiotics, social structure is a network of patterned social relations. And, rather than Levi-Strauss, this school of thought draws on the notions of structure as theorized by Levi-Strauss' contemporary anthropologist, Radcliffe-Brown. Some refer to this as "network structuralism", and equate it to "British structuralism" as opposed to the "French structuralism" of Levi-Strauss.

==== Post-structuralism ====
Post-structuralist thought has tended to reject 'humanist' assumptions in the construction of social theory. Michel Foucault provides an important critique in his Archaeology of the Human Sciences, though Habermas (1986) and Rorty (1986) have both argued that Foucault merely replaces one such system of thought with another. The dialogue between these intellectuals highlights a trend in recent years for certain schools of sociology and philosophy to intersect. The anti-humanist position has been associated with "postmodernism", a term used in specific contexts to describe an era or phenomena, but occasionally construed as a method.

== Central theoretical problems ==
Overall, there is a strong consensus regarding the central problems of sociological theory, which are largely inherited from the classical theoretical traditions. This consensus is: how to link, transcend, or cope with the following "big three" dichotomies:

1. subjectivity and objectivity, which deal with knowledge;
2. structure and agency, which deal with action;
3. and synchrony and diachrony, which deal with time.

Lastly, sociological theory often grapples with integrating or transcending the divide among micro-, meso-, and macro-scale social phenomena, which is a subset of the three central problems.

=== Subjectivity and objectivity ===
The problem of subjectivity and objectivity can be divided into two parts: a concern over the general possibilities of social actions, and the specific problem of social scientific knowledge. In the former, the subjective is often equated (though not necessarily) with the individual, and the individual's intentions and interpretations of the objective. The objective is often considered to be any public or external action or outcome, up to and including society writ large. A primary question for social theorists, then, is how knowledge reproduces along the chain of subjective-objective-subjective, that is to say: how is intersubjectivity achieved? While qualitative methods have historically sought to tease out subjective interpretations, quantitative survey methods also seek to capture individual subjectivities. Qualitative methods take an approach to objective description known as in situ, meaning that descriptions must include appropriate contextual information to be understood.

The latter concern with scientific knowledge results from the fact that a sociologist is part of the very object they seek to explain, as Bourdieu explains:

How can the sociologist effect in practice this radical doubting which is indispensable for bracketing all the presuppositions inherent in the fact that she is a social being, that she is therefore socialised and led to feel "like a fish in water" within that social world whose structures she has internalised? How can she prevent the social world itself from carrying out the construction of the object, in a sense, through her, through these unself-conscious operations or operations unaware of themselves of which she is the apparent subject?

— Pierre Bourdieu, "The Problem of Reflexive Sociology", An Invitation to Reflexive Sociology (1992), p. 235

=== Structure and agency ===
Structure and agency, sometimes referred to as determinism versus voluntarism, form an enduring ontological debate in social theory: "Do social structures determine an individual's behaviour or does human agency?" In this context, agency refers to the capacity of individuals to act independently and make free choices, whereas structure relates to factors that limit or affect the choices and actions of individuals (e.g., social class, religion, gender, ethnicity, etc.). Discussions over the primacy of either structure or agency relate to the core of sociological epistemology (i.e. "what is the social world made of?", "what is a cause in the social world, and what is an effect?"). A perennial question within this debate is that of "social reproduction": how are structures (specifically, structures producing inequality) reproduced through the choices of individuals?

=== Synchrony and diachrony ===
Synchrony and diachrony (or statics and dynamics) within social theory are terms that refer to a distinction that emerged through the work of Levi-Strauss who inherited it from the linguistics of Ferdinand de Saussure. Synchrony slices moments for analysis, thus it is an analysis of static social reality. Diachrony, on the other hand, attempts to analyse dynamic sequences. Following Saussure, synchrony would refer to social phenomena as a static concept like a language, while diachrony would refer to unfolding processes like actual speech. In Anthony Giddens' introduction to Central Problems in Social Theory, he states that, "to show the interdependence of action and structure…we must grasp the time space relations inherent in the constitution of all social interaction." And like structure and agency, time is integral to the discussion of social reproduction.

In sociology, historical sociology is often better positioned to analyse social life diachronically, while survey research takes a snapshot of social life and is thus better equipped to understand it synchronically. Some argue that the synchrony of social structure is a methodological perspective rather than an ontological claim. Nonetheless, the problem for theory is how to integrate the two manners of recording and thinking about social data.

== Research methodology ==
Sociological research methods may be divided into two broad, though often supplementary, categories:

- Qualitative designs emphasize understanding of social phenomena through direct observation, communication with participants, or analysis of texts, and may stress contextual and subjective accuracy over generality.
- Quantitative designs approach social phenomena through quantifiable evidence, and often rely on statistical analysis of many cases (or across intentionally designed treatments in an experiment) to establish valid and reliable general claims.

Sociologists are often divided into camps of support for particular research techniques. These disputes relate to the epistemological debates at the historical core of social theory. While very different in many aspects, both qualitative and quantitative approaches involve a systematic interaction between theory and data. Quantitative methodologies hold the dominant position in sociology, especially in the United States. In the discipline's two most cited journals, quantitative articles have historically outnumbered qualitative ones by a factor of two. (Most articles published in the largest British journal, on the other hand, are qualitative.) Most textbooks on the methodology of social research are written from the quantitative perspective, and the very term "methodology" is often used synonymously with "statistics". Practically all sociology PhD programmes in the United States require training in statistical methods. The work produced by quantitative researchers is also deemed more 'trustworthy' and 'unbiased' by the general public, though this judgment continues to be challenged by antipositivists.

The choice of method often depends largely on what the researcher intends to investigate. For example, a researcher concerned with drawing a statistical generalization about an entire population may administer a survey questionnaire to a representative sample. By contrast, a researcher who seeks full contextual understanding of an individual's social actions may choose ethnographic participant observation or open-ended interviews. Studies will commonly combine, or 'triangulate', quantitative and qualitative methods as part of a 'multi-strategy' design. For instance, a quantitative study may be performed to obtain statistical patterns on a target sample, and then combined with a qualitative interview to determine the play of agency.

=== Sampling ===
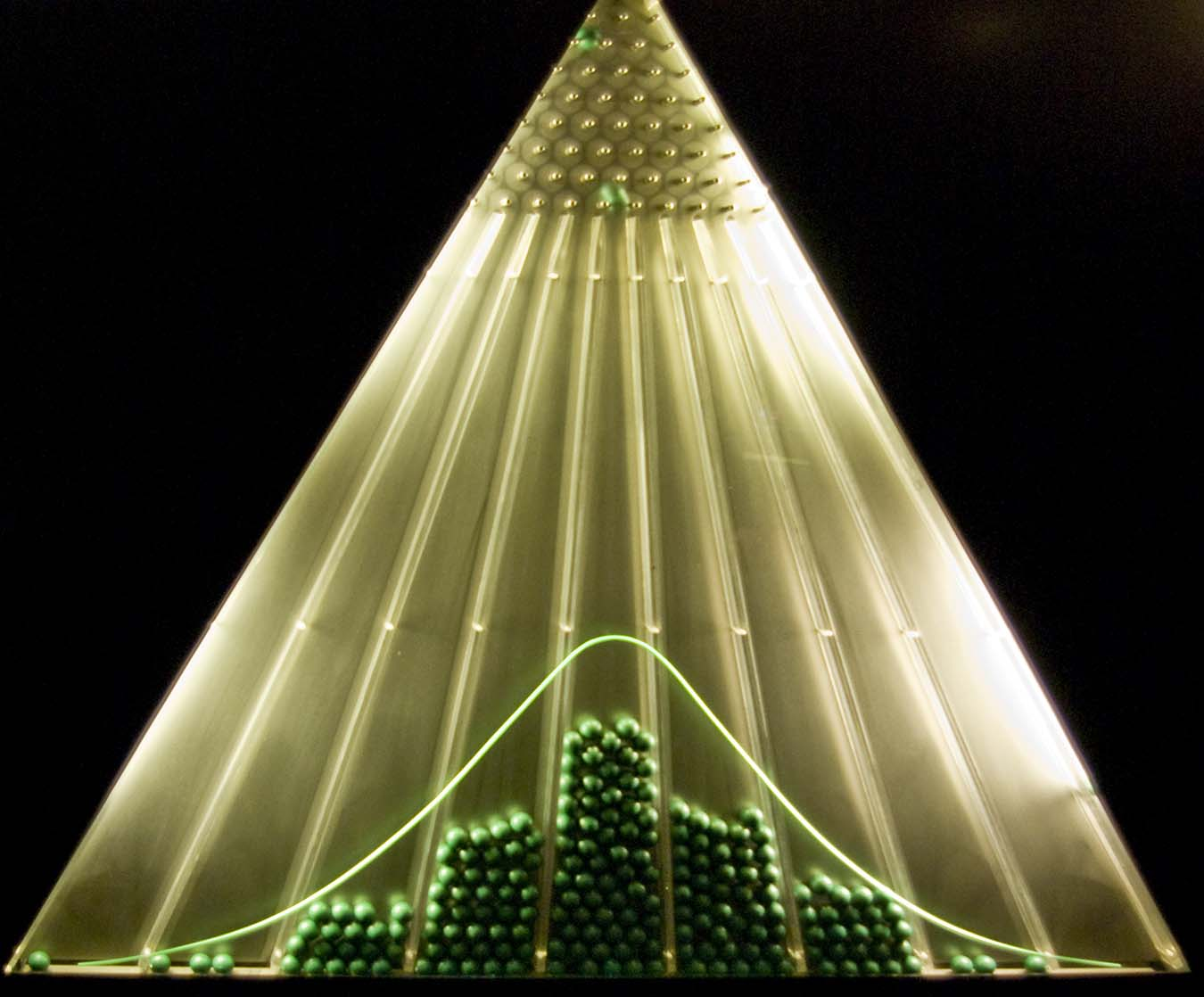
The bean machine, designed by early social research methodologist Sir Francis Galton to demonstrate the normal distribution, which is important to much of quantitative hypothesis testing (Note: The normal distribution is important in many fields of science, not just the social sciences)

Quantitative methods are often used to ask questions about a very large population, making a census or a complete enumeration of all its members infeasible. A 'sample' then forms a manageable subset of a population. In quantitative research, statistics are used to draw inferences from this sample regarding the population as a whole. The process of selecting a sample is referred to as 'sampling'. While it is usually best to sample randomly, concerns about differences between specific subpopulations sometimes call for stratified sampling. Conversely, the impossibility of random sampling sometimes necessitates nonprobability sampling, such as convenience sampling or snowball sampling.

=== Methods ===
The following list of research methods is neither exclusive nor exhaustive:

- Archival research (or the Historical method): Draws upon the secondary data located in historical archives and records, such as biographies, memoirs, journals, and so on.
- Content analysis: The content of interviews and other texts is systematically analysed. Often data is 'coded' as a part of the 'grounded theory' approach using qualitative data analysis (QDA) software, such as Atlas.ti, MAXQDA, NVivo, or QDA Miner.
- Experimental research: The researcher isolates a single social process and reproduces it in a laboratory (for example, by creating a situation where unconscious sexist judgements are possible), seeking to determine whether or not certain social variables can cause, or depend upon, other variables (for instance, seeing if people's feelings about traditional gender roles can be manipulated by the activation of contrasting gender stereotypes). Participants are randomly assigned to different groups that either serve as controls—acting as reference points because they are tested with regard to the dependent variable, albeit without having been exposed to any independent variables of interest—or receive one or more treatments. Randomization allows the researcher to be confident that any differences between groups are due to the treatment.
- Longitudinal study: An extensive examination of a specific person or group over a long period of time.
- Observation: Using data from the senses, the researcher records information about a social phenomenon or behaviour. Observation techniques may or may not feature participation. In participant observation, the researcher goes into the field (e.g., a community or a place of work) and participates in the activities of the field for a prolonged period of time to acquire a deep understanding of it. Data acquired through these techniques may be analysed either quantitatively or qualitatively. In observational research, a sociologist might study global warming in a less populated part of the world.
- Programme Evaluation is a systematic method for collecting, analysing, and using information to answer questions about projects, policies, and programmes, particularly about their effectiveness and efficiency. In both the public and private sectors, stakeholders often want to know whether the programmes they fund, implement, vote for, or object to are producing the intended effect. While programme evaluation first focuses on this definition, important considerations often include the programme's cost per participant, how it could be improved, whether it is worthwhile, whether there are better alternatives, whether there are unintended outcomes, and whether the programme's goals are appropriate and useful.
- Survey research: The researcher gathers data using interviews, questionnaires, or similar feedback from a set of people sampled from a particular population of interest. Survey items from an interview or questionnaire may be open-ended or closed-ended. Data from surveys is usually analysed statistically on a computer.

=== Computational sociology ===
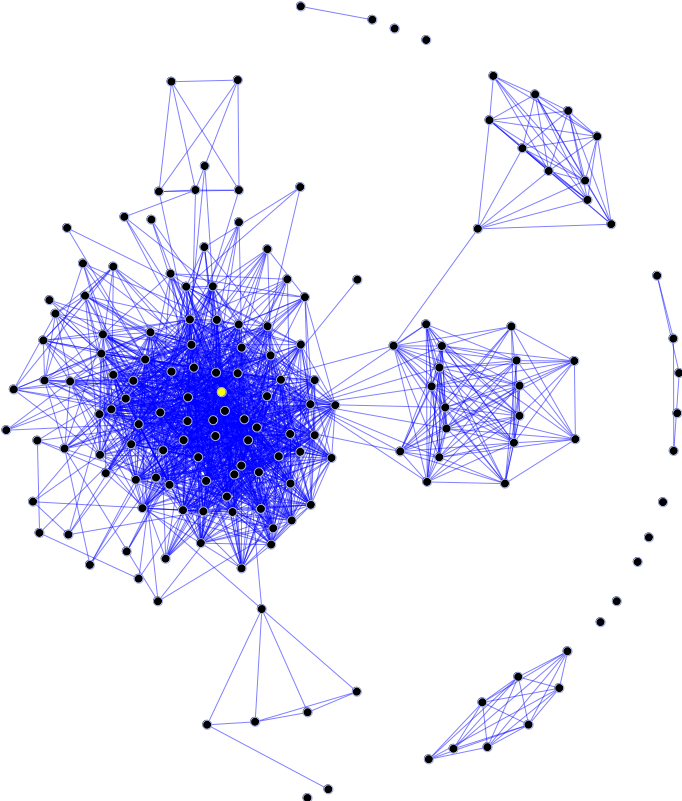
A social network diagram: individuals (or 'nodes') connected by relationships

Sociologists increasingly draw upon computationally intensive methods to analyse and model social phenomena. Using computer simulations, artificial intelligence, text mining, complex statistical methods, and new analytic approaches like social network analysis and social sequence analysis, computational sociology develops and tests theories of complex social processes through bottom-up modelling of social interactions.

Although the subject matter and methodologies in social science differ from those in natural science or computer science, several of the approaches used in contemporary social simulation originated from fields such as physics and artificial intelligence. By the same token, some of the approaches that originated in computational sociology have been imported into the natural sciences, such as measures of network centrality from the fields of social network analysis and network science. In relevant literature, computational sociology is often related to the study of social complexity. Social complexity concepts such as complex systems, non-linear interconnection among macro and micro process, and emergence, have entered the vocabulary of computational sociology. A practical and well-known example is the construction of a computational model in the form of an "artificial society", by which researchers can analyse the structure of a social system.

== Subfields ==
=== Culture ===
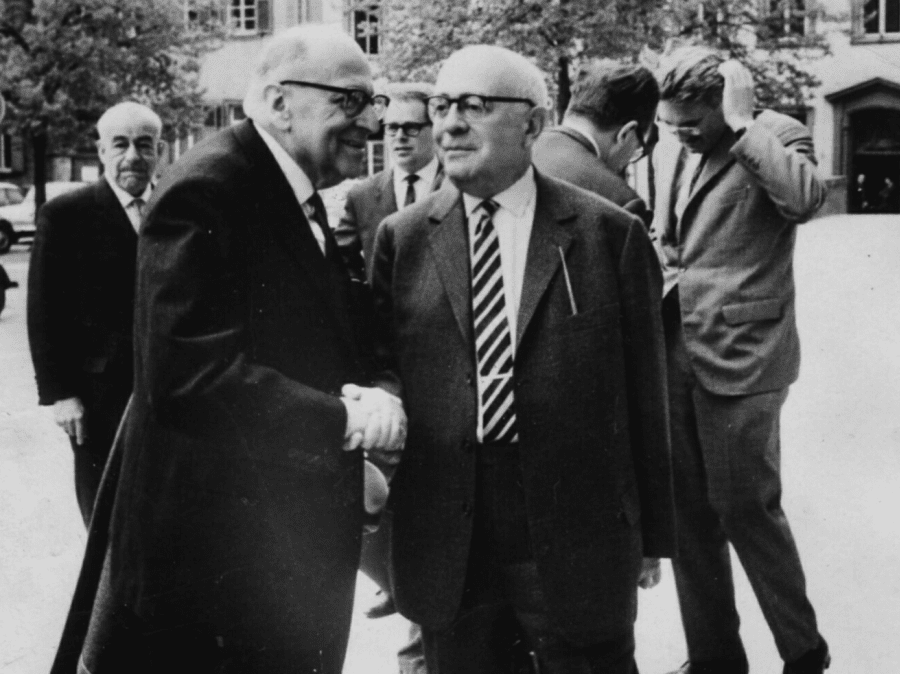
Max Horkheimer (left, front), Theodor Adorno (right, front), and Jürgen Habermas (right, back), 1965

Sociologists' approach to culture can be divided into "sociology of culture" and "cultural sociology"—terms that are similar, though not entirely interchangeable. Sociology of culture is an older term, and it considers some topics and objects as more or less "cultural" than others. Conversely, cultural sociology sees all social phenomena as inherently cultural. Sociology of culture often attempts to explain certain cultural phenomena as a product of social processes, while cultural sociology sees culture as a potential explanation of social phenomena.

For Simmel, culture referred to "the cultivation of individuals through the agency of external forms which have been objectified in the course of history". While early theorists such as Durkheim and Mauss were influential in cultural anthropology, sociologists of culture are generally distinguished by their concern for modern (rather than primitive or ancient) society. Cultural sociology often involves the hermeneutic analysis of words, artefacts and symbols, or ethnographic interviews. However, some sociologists employ historical-comparative or quantitative techniques in the analysis of culture, such as Weber and Bourdieu. The subfield is sometimes allied with critical theory in the vein of Theodor W. Adorno, Walter Benjamin, and other members of the Frankfurt School. Loosely distinct from the sociology of culture is the field of cultural studies. Birmingham School theorists such as Richard Hoggart and Stuart Hall questioned the division between "producers" and "consumers" evident in earlier theory, emphasizing the reciprocity in the production of texts. Cultural Studies aims to examine its subject matter in terms of cultural practices and their relation to power. For example, a study of a subculture (e.g., white working-class youth in London) would consider the group's social practices in relation to the dominant class. The "cultural turn" of the 1960s ultimately placed culture much higher on the sociological agenda.

==== Art, music, and literature ====
Sociology of literature, film, and art is a subset of the sociology of culture. This field studies the social production of artistic objects and their social implications. A notable example is Pierre Bourdieu's Les Règles de L'Art: Genèse et Structure du Champ Littéraire (1992). None of the founding fathers of sociology produced a detailed study of art, but they did develop ideas that were subsequently applied to literature by others. Marx's theory of ideology was directed at literature by Pierre Macherey, Terry Eagleton, and Fredric Jameson. Weber's theory of modernity as cultural rationalization, which he applied to music, was later extended by Frankfurt School writers such as Theodor Adorno and Jürgen Habermas to all the arts, including literature. Durkheim's view of sociology as the study of externally defined social facts was redirected towards literature by Robert Escarpit. Bourdieu's own work is clearly indebted to Marx, Weber, and Durkheim.

=== Criminality, deviance, law and punishment ===
Criminologists analyse the nature, causes, and control of criminal activity, drawing upon methods from sociology, psychology, and the behavioural sciences. The sociology of deviance focuses on actions or behaviours that violate norms, including both infringements of formally enacted rules (e.g., crime) and informal violations of cultural norms. It is the remit of sociologists to study why these norms exist, how they change over time, and how they are enforced. The concept of social disorganization refers to the idea that broader social systems lead to norm violations. For instance, Robert K. Merton produced a typology of deviance, which includes both individual and system-level causal explanations of deviance.

==== Sociology of law ====
The study of law played a significant role in the formation of classical sociology. Durkheim famously described law as the "visible symbol" of social solidarity. The sociology of law refers to both a sub-discipline of sociology and an approach within the field of legal studies. Sociology of law is a diverse field of study that examines the interaction between law and other aspects of society, including the development of legal institutions and the effects of laws on social change, and vice versa. For example, an influential recent work in the field relies on statistical analyses to argue that the increase in incarceration in the US over the last 30 years is due to changes in law and policing and not to an increase in crime; and that this increase has significantly contributed to the persistence of racial stratification.

=== Communications and information technologies ===
The sociology of communications and information technologies includes "the social aspects of computing, the Internet, new media, computer networks, and other communication and information technologies".

==== Internet and digital media ====
The Internet is of interest to sociologists in various ways, most practically as a tool for research and as a discussion platform. The sociology of the Internet in the broad sense concerns the analysis of online communities (e.g. newsgroups, social networking sites) and virtual worlds, meaning that there is often overlap with community sociology. Online communities may be studied statistically through network analysis or interpreted qualitatively through virtual ethnography. Moreover, organizational change is catalysed by new media, thereby influencing social change at large, perhaps forming the framework for a transformation from an industrial to an informational society. One notable text is Manuel Castells' The Internet Galaxy—the title of which forms an inter-textual reference to Marshall McLuhan's The Gutenberg Galaxy. Closely related to the sociology of the Internet is digital sociology, which expands the scope of study to address not only the Internet but also the impact of other digital media and devices that have emerged since the first decade of the twenty-first century.

==== Media ====
As with cultural studies, media studies is a distinct discipline that owes its development to the convergence of sociology and other social sciences and the humanities, in particular literary criticism and critical theory. Though neither the production process nor the critique of aesthetic forms is in the remit of sociologists, analyses of socializing factors, such as ideological effects and audience reception, stem from sociological theory and method. Thus, the 'sociology of the media' is not a subdiscipline per se, but the media is a common and often indispensable topic.

=== Economic sociology ===
The term "economic sociology" was first used by William Stanley Jevons in 1879 and was later coined in the works of Durkheim, Weber, and Simmel between 1890 and 1920. Economic sociology arose as a new approach to the analysis of economic phenomena, emphasizing class relations and modernity as a philosophical concept. The relationship between capitalism and modernity is a salient issue, perhaps best demonstrated in Weber's The Protestant Ethic and the Spirit of Capitalism (1905) and Simmel's The Philosophy of Money (1900). The contemporary period of economic sociology, also known as new economic sociology, was consolidated by the 1985 work of Mark Granovetter titled "Economic Action and Social Structure: The Problem of Embeddedness". This work elaborated the concept of embeddedness, which states that economic relations between individuals or firms take place within existing social relations (and are thus structured by these relations as well as the greater social structures of which those relations are a part). Social network analysis has been the primary methodology for studying this phenomenon. Granovetter's theory of the strength of weak ties and Ronald Burt's concept of structural holes are two of the best-known theoretical contributions of this field.

==== Work, employment, and industry ====
The sociology of work, or industrial sociology, examines "the direction and implications of trends in technological change, globalization, labour markets, work organization, managerial practices and employment relations to the extent to which these trends are intimately related to changing patterns of inequality in modern societies and to the changing experiences of individuals and families how workers challenge, resist and make their own contributions to the patterning of work and shaping of work institutions".

=== Education ===
The sociology of education is the study of how educational institutions determine social structures, experiences, and other outcomes. It is particularly concerned with the schooling systems of modern industrial societies. A classic 1966 study in this field by James Coleman, known as the "Coleman Report", analysed the performance of over 150,000 students and found that student background and socioeconomic status are much more important in determining educational outcomes than are measured differences in school resources (i.e. per pupil spending). The controversy over "school effects" ignited by that study has continued to this day. The study also found that socially disadvantaged black students profited from schooling in racially mixed classrooms, and thus served as a catalyst for desegregation busing in American public schools.

=== Environment ===
Environmental sociology is the study of human interactions with the natural environment, typically emphasizing the human dimensions of environmental problems, their social impacts, and efforts to resolve them. As with other subfields of sociology, scholarship in environmental sociology may operate at one or multiple levels of analysis, from global (e.g., world-systems) to societal to individual. Attention is also paid to the processes by which environmental problems become defined and known to humans. As argued by the notable environmental sociologist John Bellamy Foster, the precursor to modern environmental sociology is Marx's analysis of the metabolic rift, which has influenced contemporary thought on sustainability. Environmental sociology is often interdisciplinary and overlaps with the sociology of risk, rural sociology, and the sociology of disaster.

==== Human ecology ====
Human ecology is the interdisciplinary study of the relationships between humans and their natural, social, and built environments. In addition to Environmental sociology, this field overlaps with architectural sociology, urban sociology, and to some extent visual sociology. In turn, visual sociology—which is concerned with all visual dimensions of social life—overlaps with media studies in that it uses photography, film, and other media technologies.

==== Social pre-wiring ====
Social pre-wiring concerns the study of foetal social behaviour and interactions in a multi-foetal environment. Specifically, social pre-wiring refers to the ontogeny of social interaction. Also informally referred to as "wired to be social". The theory questions whether there is a propensity to socially oriented action already present before birth. Research in the field concludes that newborns are born with a unique genetic wiring for social behaviour.

Circumstantial evidence supporting the social pre-wiring hypothesis can be revealed when examining newborns' behaviour. Newborns, not even hours after birth, have been found to display a preparedness for social interaction. This preparedness is expressed in ways such as their imitation of facial gestures. This observed behaviour cannot be attributed to any current form of socialization or social construction. Rather, newborns most likely inherit to some extent social behaviour and identity through genetics.

The principal evidence for this theory is uncovered by examining Twin pregnancies. The main argument is, if there are social behaviour that are inherited and developed before birth, then one should expect twin foetuses to engage in some form of social interaction before they are born. Thus, 10 foetuses were analysed over time using ultrasound. Using kinematic analysis, the experiment found that the twin foetuses interacted with each other for longer periods and more often as the pregnancies progressed. Researchers concluded that the movements between the co-twins were not accidental but specifically aimed.

The social pre-wiring hypothesis was proved correct:

The central advance of this study is the demonstration that 'social actions' are already performed in the second trimester of gestation. Starting from the 14th week of gestation, twin foetuses plan and execute movements specifically aimed at the co-twin. These findings force us to predate the emergence of social behavior: when the context enables it, as in the case of twin foetuses, other-directed actions are not only possible but predominant over self-directed actions.

=== Family, gender, and sexuality ===
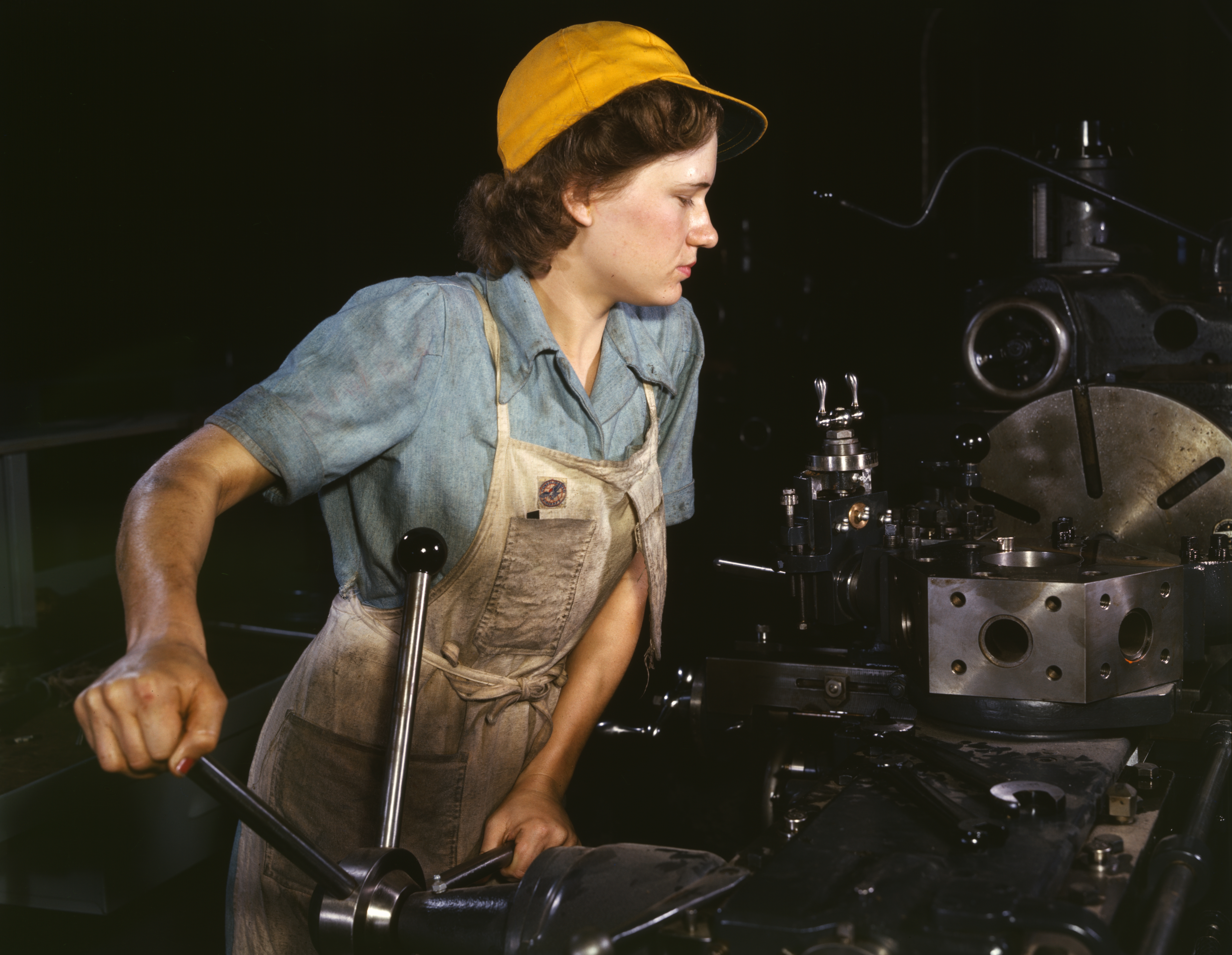
"Rosie the Riveter" was an iconic symbol of the American homefront and a departure from gender roles due to wartime necessity.

Family, gender, and sexuality constitute a broad area of inquiry studied across many subfields of sociology. A family is a group of people related by kinship ties: blood/marriage/civil partnership, or adoption. The family unit is one of the most important social institutions found in some form in nearly all known societies. It is the basic unit of social organization and plays a key role in socializing children into their society's culture. The sociology of the family examines the family as an institution and a unit of socialization, with particular concern for the comparatively modern emergence of the nuclear family and its distinct gender roles. The notion of "childhood" is also significant. As one of the more basic institutions to which sociological perspectives may be applied, the family is a common component of introductory academic curricula. Feminist sociology, on the other hand, is a normative sub-field that observes and critiques the cultural categories of gender and sexuality, particularly with respect to power and inequality. The primary concern of feminist theory is the patriarchy and the systematic oppression of women apparent in many societies, both at the level of small-scale interaction and in terms of the broader social structure. Feminist sociology also analyses how gender interlocks with race and class to produce and perpetuate social inequalities. "How to account for the differences in definitions of femininity and masculinity and in sex role across different societies and historical periods" is also a concern.

=== Health, illness, and the body ===
The sociology of health and illness focuses on the social effects of, and public attitudes toward, illnesses, diseases, mental health, and disabilities. This sub-field also overlaps with gerontology and the study of the ageing process. Medical sociology, by contrast, focuses on the inner workings of the medical profession, its organizations and institutions, and how these can shape knowledge and interactions. In Britain, sociology was introduced into the medical curriculum following the Goodenough Report (1944).. In Europe, the field of sociology of health and illness is academically represented by the European Society of Health and Medical Sociology (ESHMS). Founded in 1983, the society organises the European biennial conference and awards the Health and Medical Sociology Excellence Prize, among other distinctions.

The sociology of the body and embodiment takes a broad perspective on the idea of "the body". It includes "a wide range of embodied dynamics including human and non-human bodies, morphology, human reproduction, anatomy, body fluids, biotechnology, genetics". This often intersects with health and illness, as well as theories of bodies as political, social, cultural, economic and ideological productions. The ISA maintains a Research Committee devoted to "the Body in the Social Sciences".

==== Death, dying, bereavement ====
A subfield of the sociology of health and illness that overlaps with cultural sociology is the study of death, dying and bereavement, sometimes referred to broadly as the sociology of death. This topic is exemplified by the work of Douglas Davies and Michael C. Kearl.

=== Knowledge and science ===
The sociology of knowledge is the study of the relationship between human thought and the social context within which it arises, and of the effects prevailing ideas have on societies. The term first came into widespread use in the 1920s, when several German-speaking theorists, most notably Max Scheler and Karl Mannheim, wrote extensively on it. With the dominance of functionalism through the middle years of the 20th century, the sociology of knowledge tended to remain on the periphery of mainstream sociological thought. It was largely reinvented and applied much more closely to everyday life in the 1960s, particularly by Peter L. Berger and Thomas Luckmann in The Social Construction of Reality (1966) and is still central for methods dealing with qualitative understanding of human society (compare socially constructed reality). The "archaeological" and "genealogical" studies of Michel Foucault are of considerable contemporary influence.

The sociology of science involves the study of science as a social activity, especially the study of "with the social conditions and effects of science, and with the social structures and processes of scientific activity". Important theorists in the sociology of science include Robert K. Merton and Bruno Latour. These branches of sociology have contributed to the formation of science and technology studies. Both the ASA and the BSA have sections devoted to the subfield of Science, Knowledge and Technology. The ISA maintains a Research Committee on Science and Technology.

=== Leisure ===
Sociology of leisure is the study of how humans organize their free time. Leisure includes a broad array of activities, such as sport, tourism, and the playing of games. The sociology of leisure is closely tied to the sociology of work, as each explores a different side of the work–leisure relationship. More recent studies in the field move away from the work–leisure relationship and focus on the relation between leisure and culture. This area of sociology began with Thorstein Veblen's Theory of the Leisure Class.

=== Peace, war, and conflict ===
This subfield of sociology broadly studies the dynamics of war, conflict resolution, peace movements, war refugees, and military institutions. As a subset of this subfield, military sociology aims towards the systematic study of the military as a social group rather than as an organization. It is a highly specialized sub-field which examines issues related to service personnel as a distinct group with coerced collective action based on shared interests linked to survival in vocation and combat, with purposes and values that are more defined and narrower than within civil society. Military sociology also concerns civilian-military relations and interactions between other groups or governmental agencies. Topics include the dominant assumptions held by those in the military, changes in military members' willingness to fight, military unionization, military professionalism, the increased use of women, the military-industrial-academic complex, the military's dependence on research, and the military's institutional and organizational structure.

=== Political sociology ===
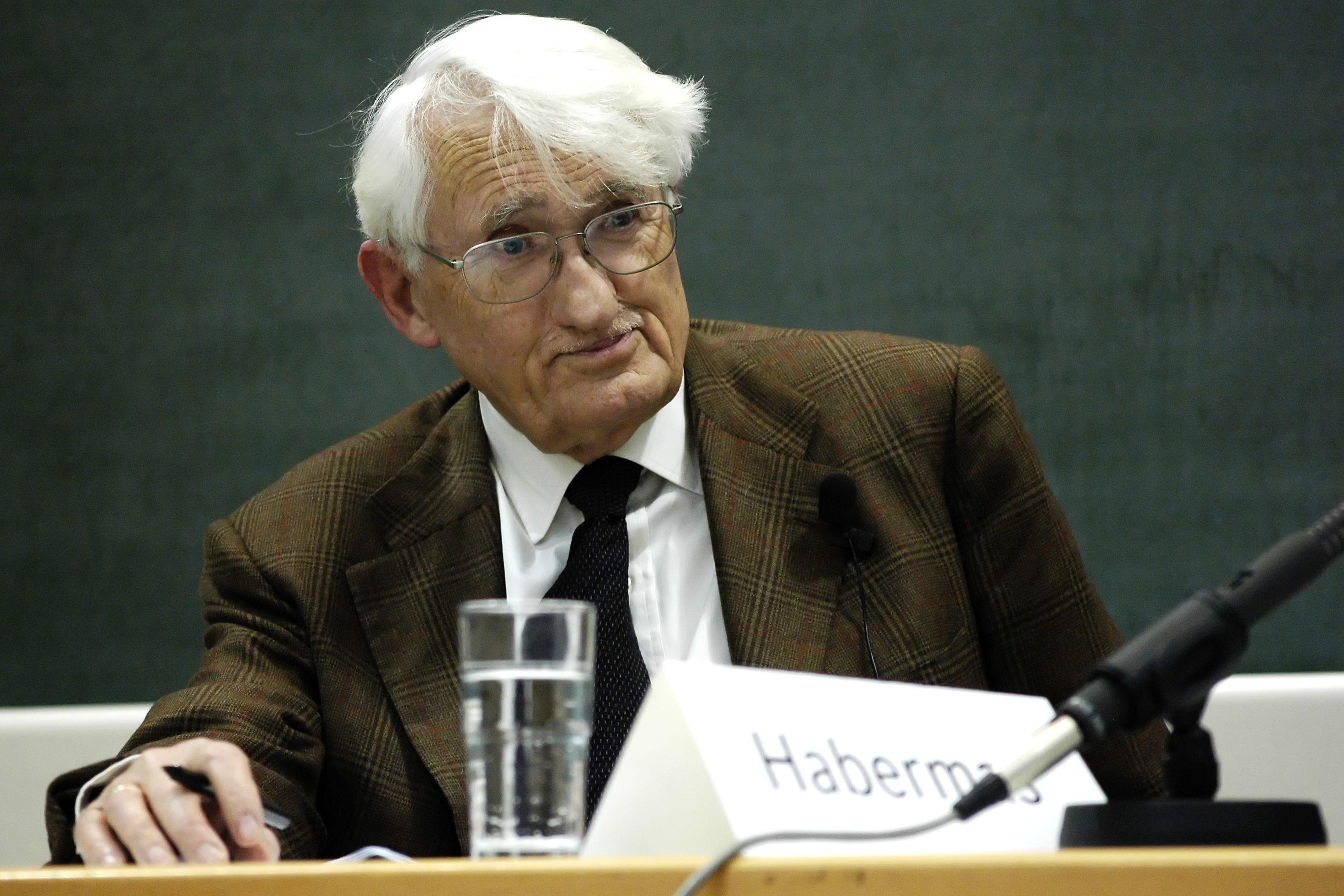
Jürgen Habermas

Historically, political sociology concerned the relations between political organization and society. A typical research question in this area might be: "Why do so few American citizens choose to vote?" In this respect, questions of political opinion formation brought about some of the pioneering uses of statistical survey research by Paul Lazarsfeld. A major subfield of political sociology developed in relation to such questions and draws on comparative history to analyse socio-political trends. The field developed from the work of Max Weber and Moisey Ostrogorsky.

Contemporary political sociology includes these areas of research, but it has also been opened to broader questions of power and politics. Today, political sociologists are as likely to be concerned with how identities are formed that contribute to structural domination by one group over another; the politics of who knows how and with what authority; and questions of how power is contested in social interactions in such a way as to bring about widespread cultural and social change. Such questions are more likely to be studied qualitatively. The study of social movements and their effects has been especially important in relation to these wider definitions of politics and power.

Political sociology has also moved beyond methodological nationalism and analysed the role of non-governmental organizations, the diffusion of the nation-state throughout the Earth as a social construct, and the role of stateless entities in the modern world society. Contemporary political sociologists also study interstate interactions and human rights.

=== Population and demography ===
Demographers or sociologists of population study the size, composition, and change over time of a given population. Demographers study how these characteristics impact, or are impacted by, various social, economic, or political systems. The study of population is also closely related to human ecology and environmental sociology, which studies a population's relationship with the surrounding environment and often overlaps with urban or rural sociology. Researchers in this field may study the movement of populations: transportation, migrations, diaspora, etc., which falls into the subfield known as mobilities studies and is closely related to human geography. Demographers may also study the spread of disease within a given population, a field known as epidemiology.

=== Public sociology ===
Public sociology refers to an approach to the discipline that seeks to transcend the academy to engage with wider audiences. It is perhaps best understood as a style of sociology rather than a particular method, theory, or set of political values. This approach is primarily associated with Michael Burawoy, who contrasted it with professional sociology, a form of academic sociology that is concerned primarily with addressing other professional sociologists. Public sociology is also part of the broader field of science communication or science journalism.

=== Race and ethnic relations ===
The sociology of race and of ethnic relations is the area of the discipline that studies the social, political, and economic relations between races and ethnicities at all levels of society. This area encompasses the study of racism, residential segregation, and other complex social processes between different racial and ethnic groups. This research frequently interacts with other areas of sociology, such as stratification and social psychology, as well as with postcolonial theory. At the level of political policy, ethnic relations are discussed in terms of either assimilationism or multiculturalism. Anti-racism is another policy approach, particularly popular in the 1960s and 1970s.

=== Religion ===
The sociology of religion concerns the practices, historical backgrounds, developments, universal themes, and roles of religion in society. There is particular emphasis on the recurring role of religion in all societies and throughout recorded history. The sociology of religion is distinguished from the philosophy of religion in that sociologists do not set out to assess the validity of religious truth-claims, instead assuming what Peter L. Berger has described as a position of "methodological atheism". It may be said that the modern formal discipline of sociology began with the analysis of religion in Durkheim's 1897 study of suicide rates among Roman Catholic and Protestant populations. Max Weber published four major texts on religion in a context of economic sociology and social stratification: The Protestant Ethic and the Spirit of Capitalism (1905), The Religion of China: Confucianism and Taoism (1915), The Religion of India: The Sociology of Hinduism and Buddhism (1915), and Ancient Judaism (1920). Contemporary debates often centre on topics such as secularization, civil religion, the intersection of religion and economics, and the role of religion in a context of globalization and multiculturalism.

=== Social change and development ===
The sociology of change and development attempts to understand how societies develop and how they can be changed. This includes studying many different aspects of society, for example demographic trends, political or technological trends, or changes in culture. Within this field, sociologists often use macrosociological methods or historical-comparative methods. In contemporary studies of social change, there are overlaps with international development or community development. However, most founders of sociology developed theories of social change based on their studies of history. For instance, Marx contended that the material circumstances of society ultimately caused the ideal or cultural aspects of society, while Weber argued that it was in fact the cultural mores of Protestantism that ushered in a transformation of material circumstances. In contrast to both, Durkheim argued that societies moved from simple to complex through a process of sociocultural evolution. Sociologists in this field also study processes of globalization and imperialism. Most notably, Immanuel Wallerstein extends Marx's theoretical framework to encompass long spans of time and the entire globe in what is known as world systems theory. Development sociology is also heavily influenced by post-colonialism. In recent years, Raewyn Connell issued a critique of the bias in sociological research towards countries in the Global North. She argues that this bias blinds sociologists to the lived experiences of the Global South, specifically, so-called "Northern Theory" lacks an adequate theory of imperialism and colonialism.

Many organizations are studying social change, including the Fernand Braudel Center for the Study of Economies, Historical Systems, and Civilizations, and the Global Social Change Research Project.

=== Social networks ===
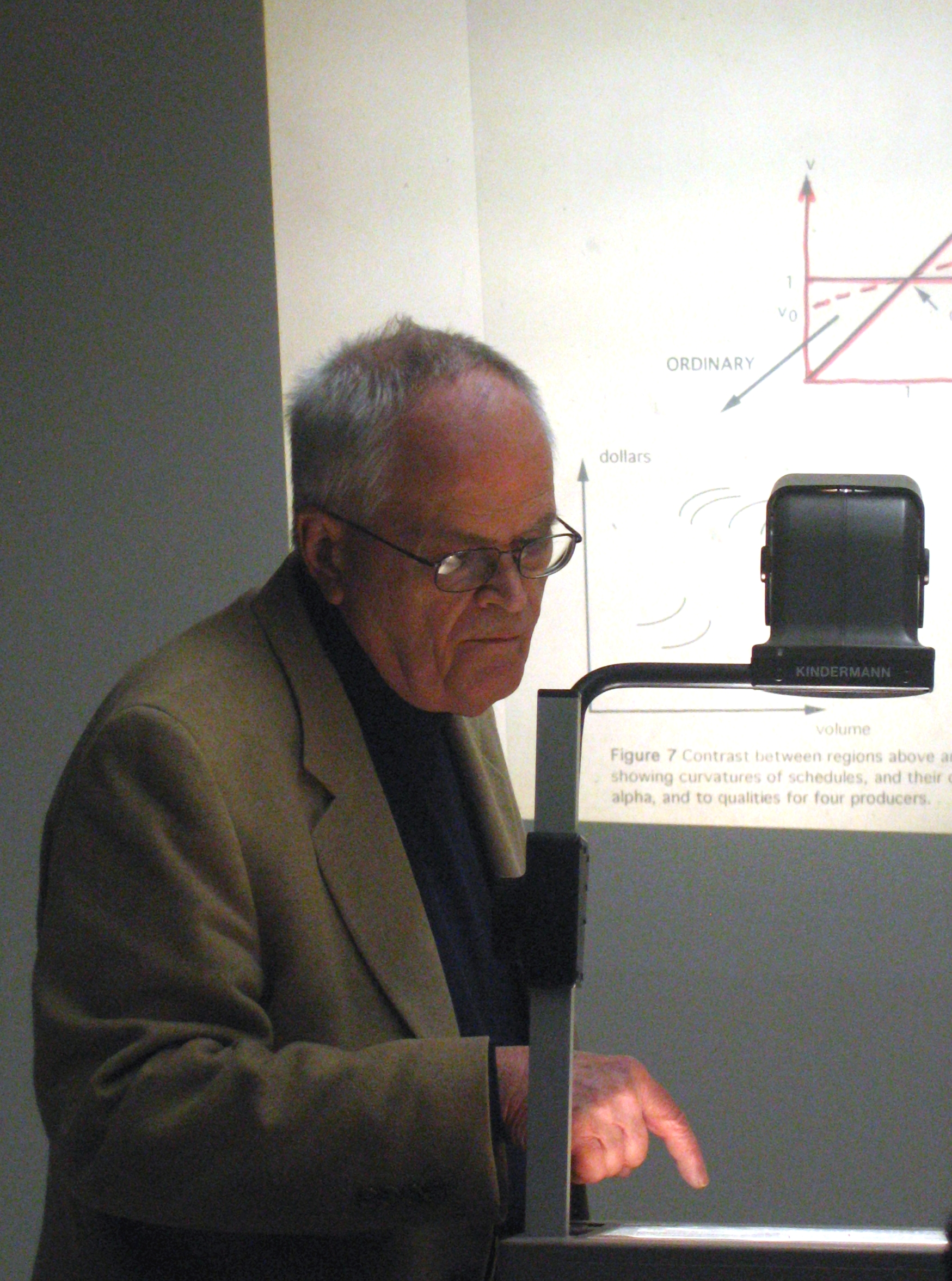
Harrison White

A social network is a social structure composed of individuals (or organizations) called "nodes", which are tied (connected) by one or more specific types of interdependency, such as friendship, kinship, financial exchange, dislike, sexual relationships, or relationships of beliefs, knowledge or prestige. Social networks operate on many levels, from families to nations, and play a critical role in determining how problems are solved, how organizations are run, and the extent to which individuals succeed in achieving their goals. An underlying theoretical assumption of social network analysis is that groups are not necessarily the building blocks of society: the approach is open to studying less-bounded social systems, from non-local communities to networks of exchange. Drawing theoretically on relational sociology, social network analysis avoids treating individuals (persons, organizations, states) as discrete units of analysis; it instead focuses on how the structure of ties affects and constitutes individuals and their relationships. In contrast to analyses that assume socialization into norms determines behaviour, network analysis examines the extent to which the structure and composition of ties affect norms. On the other hand, recent research by Omar Lizardo also demonstrates that preexisting cultural tastes shape network ties. Social network theory is usually defined in formal mathematics and may include integration of geographical data into sociomapping.

=== Social psychology ===
Sociological social psychology focuses on micro-scale social actions. This area may be described as adhering to "sociological miniaturism", examining whole societies by studying individual thoughts and emotions, as well as the behaviour of small groups. One special concern to psychological sociologists is how to explain a variety of demographic, social, and cultural facts in terms of human social interaction. Some of the major topics in this field are social inequality, group dynamics, prejudice, aggression, social perception, group behaviour, social change, non-verbal behaviour, socialization, conformity, leadership, and social identity. Social psychology may be taught with psychological emphasis. In sociology, researchers in this field are the most prominent users of the experimental method (however, unlike their psychological counterparts, they also frequently employ other methodologies). Social psychology examines social influences, social perception, and social interaction.

=== Stratification, poverty, and inequality ===
Social stratification is the hierarchical arrangement of individuals into social classes, castes, and divisions within a society. Modern Western societies stratification traditionally relates to cultural and economic classes arranged in three main layers: upper class, middle class, and lower class, but each class may be further subdivided into smaller classes (e.g., occupational). Social stratification is interpreted in radically different ways within sociology. Proponents of structural functionalism suggest that, since the stratification of classes and castes is evident in all societies, hierarchy must be beneficial in stabilizing their existence. Conflict theorists, by contrast, critique the inaccessibility of resources and lack of social mobility in stratified societies.

Karl Marx distinguished social classes by their connection to the means of production in the capitalist system: the bourgeoisie own the means, but this effectively includes the proletariat itself as the workers can only sell their own labour power (forming the material base of the cultural superstructure). Max Weber critiqued Marxist economic determinism, arguing that social stratification is not based solely on economic inequalities but also on other status and power differentials (e.g., patriarchy). According to Weber, stratification may occur among at least three complex variables:

1. Property (class): A person's economic position in a society, based on birth and individual achievement. Weber differs from Marx in that he does not see this as the supreme factor in stratification. Weber noted how managers of corporations or industries control firms they do not own; Marx would have placed such a person in the proletariat.
2. Prestige (status): A person's prestige, or popularity in a society. This could be determined by the kind of job this person does or their wealth.
3. Power (political party): A person's ability to get their way despite the resistance of others. For example, individuals in state positions, such as an employee of the Federal Bureau of Investigation or a member of the United States Congress, may have little property or status, yet still wield immense power.

Pierre Bourdieu provides a modern example in the concepts of cultural and symbolic capital. Theorists such as Ralf Dahrendorf have noted the tendency towards an enlarged middle-class in modern Western societies, particularly in relation to the necessity of an educated workforce in technological or service-based economies. Perspectives concerning globalization, such as dependency theory, suggest this effect owes to the shift of workers to the developing countries.

=== Urban and rural sociology ===
Urban sociology involves the analysis of social life and human interaction in metropolitan areas. It is a discipline that seeks to provide advice on planning and policy-making. W. E. B. Du Bois published The Philadelphia Negro, the first empirical urban sociological study, in 1899. He proposed the theory of double consciousness in later essays in The Souls of Black Folk (1903). After the Industrial Revolution, works such as Georg Simmel's The Metropolis and Mental Life (1903) focused on urbanization and its effects on alienation and anonymity. In the 1920s and 1930s, the Chicago School produced a major body of theory on the nature of the city, important to both urban sociology and criminology, utilizing symbolic interactionism as a method of field research. Contemporary research is commonly placed in a context of globalization, for instance, in Saskia Sassen's study of the "global city". Rural sociology, by contrast, is the analysis of non-metropolitan areas. Because agriculture and wilderness are more prominent social facts in rural regions, rural sociologists often overlap with environmental sociologists.

==== Community sociology ====
Often grouped with urban and rural sociology is that of community sociology, or the sociology of community. Taking various communities—including online communities—as the unit of analysis, community sociologists study the origin and effects of different associations of people. For instance, German sociologist Ferdinand Tönnies distinguished between two types of human association: gemeinschaft (usually translated as "community") and gesellschaft ("society" or "association"). In his 1887 work, Gemeinschaft und Gesellschaft, Tönnies argued that Gemeinschaft is perceived as a tighter, more cohesive social entity due to the presence of a "unity of will". The 'development' or 'health' of a community is also a central concern of community sociologists, who also engage in development sociology, exemplified by the literature surrounding the concept of social capital.

== Other academic disciplines ==
Sociology overlaps with a variety of disciplines that study society, in particular social anthropology, political science, economics, social work, and social philosophy. Many comparatively new fields, such as communication studies, cultural studies, demography, and literary theory, draw upon methods that originated in sociology. The terms "social science" and "social research" have both gained a degree of autonomy since they originated in classical sociology. The distinct field of social anthropology or anthroposociology is the dominant constituent of anthropology throughout the United Kingdom and Commonwealth and much of Europe (France in particular), where it is distinguished from cultural anthropology. In the United States, social anthropology is commonly subsumed within cultural anthropology (or under the relatively new designation of sociocultural anthropology).

Sociology and applied sociology are connected to the professional and academic discipline of social work. Both disciplines study social interactions, community, and the effect of various systems (i.e., family, school, community, laws, political sphere) on the individual. However, social work is generally more focused on practical strategies to alleviate social dysfunctions; sociology in general provides a thorough examination of the root causes of these problems. For example, a sociologist might study why a community is plagued with poverty. The applied sociologist would be more focused on practical strategies on what needs to be done to alleviate this burden. The social worker would be focused on action; implementing theses strategies "directly" or "indirectly" by means of mental health therapy, counselling, advocacy, community organization or community mobilization.

Social anthropology is the branch of anthropology that studies how contemporary living human beings behave in social groups. Practitioners of social anthropology, like sociologists, investigate various facets of social organization. Traditionally, social anthropologists analysed non-industrial and non-Western societies, whereas sociologists focused on industrialized societies in the Western world. In recent years, however, social anthropology has expanded its focus to modern Western societies, leading the two disciplines to converge.

Sociocultural anthropology, which includes linguistic anthropology, is concerned with the problems of difference and similarity within and between human populations. The discipline arose concomitantly with the expansion of European colonial empires, and its practices and theories have been questioned and reformulated along with processes of decolonization. Such issues have re-emerged as transnational processes have challenged the centrality of the nation-state to theorizations about culture and power. New challenges have emerged as public debates about multiculturalism, and the increasing use of the culture concept outside of the academy and among peoples studied by anthropology.

Irving Louis Horowitz, in his The Decomposition of Sociology (1994), has argued that the discipline, while arriving from a "distinguished lineage and tradition", is in decline due to deeply ideological theory and a lack of relevance to policy making: "The decomposition of sociology began when this great tradition became subject to ideological thinking, and an inferior tradition surfaced in the wake of totalitarian triumphs." Furthermore: "A problem yet unmentioned is that sociology's malaise has left all the social sciences vulnerable to pure positivism—to an empiricism lacking any theoretical basis. Talented individuals who might, in an earlier time, have gone into sociology are seeking intellectual stimulation in business, law, the natural sciences, and even creative writing; this drains sociology of much needed potential." Horowitz cites the lack of a 'core discipline' as exacerbating the problem. Randall Collins, the Dorothy Swaine Thomas Professor in Sociology at the University of Pennsylvania and a member of the Advisory Editors Council of the Social Evolution & History journal, has voiced similar sentiments: "we have lost all coherence as a discipline, we are breaking up into a conglomerate of specialities, each going on its own way and with none too high regard for each other."

In 2007, The Times Higher Education Guide published a list of 'The most cited authors of books in the Humanities' (including philosophy and psychology). Seven of the top ten are listed as sociologists: Michel Foucault (1), Pierre Bourdieu (2), Anthony Giddens (5), Erving Goffman (6), Jürgen Habermas (7), Max Weber (8), and Bruno Latour (10).

== Journals ==
The most highly ranked general journals which publish original research in the field of sociology are the American Journal of Sociology and the American Sociological Review. The Annual Review of Sociology, which publishes original review essays, is also highly ranked. Many other generalist and specialized journals exist.

== See also ==
- Bibliography of sociology
- Critical juncture theory
- Cultural theory
- Engaged theory
- Historic recurrence
- History of the social sciences
- List of sociologists
- Outline of sociology
- Political sociology
- Post-industrial society
- Social theory
- Social policy
- Social psychology
- Sociological Francoism
