= The Religion of India =

1916 book by Max Weber

The Religion of India: The Sociology of Hinduism and Buddhism
- Title page for The Religion of India (1958 edition)
- Author: Max Weber
- Original title: Hinduismus und Buddhismus
- Publication date: 1916

The Religion of India: The Sociology of Hinduism and Buddhism is a book on the sociology of religion written by Max Weber, a German economist and sociologist of the early twentieth century. The original edition was in German under the title Hinduismus und Buddhismus and published in 1916. An English translation was made in 1958 and several editions have been released since then.

It was his third major work on the sociology of religion, after The Protestant Ethic and the Spirit of Capitalism (1905) and The Religion of China: Confucianism and Taoism (1915). In this work he deals with the structure of Indian society, with the orthodox doctrines of Hinduism and the heterodox doctrines of Buddhism, with the changes wrought by popular religiosity and their influence on the secular ethic of Indian society.

== The Hindu social system ==
The Indian social system was influenced by the concept of varna. It directly linked religious belief and the segregation of society into status groups. Weber goes on to describe the Varna system (the Brahmins – priests, the Kshatriyas – warriors, the Vaishyas – merchants, the Shudras – laborers and the Untouchable).

Weber pays special attention to Brahmins and considers why they occupied the highest place in Indian society for many centuries. With regards to the concept of dharma he concludes that the Indian ethical pluralism is very different both from the universal ethic of Confucianism and Christianity. He notes that the varna system prevented the development of urban status groups.

== Hindu orthodoxy and Brahmin restoration ==
After the structure of the society, Weber analysed the Hindu religious beliefs – asceticism and the Hindu view of the world, the Brahman orthodox doctrines, the rise and fall of Buddhism in India, the Hindu restoration and the evolution of guru.

== Secular ethic and impact of Hindu beliefs on economy ==
Weber discussed what influence Hinduism and Buddhism had on the mundane activities, and how they impacted the economy. He noted the idea of unchanging world order consisting of the eternal cycles of rebirth, and the deprecation of mundane world. By the traditionalism of the Varna system supported by the dharma, the economic development is slowed as, – according to Weber – the "spirit" of the varna system worked against the development of capitalism.

== Asian belief system ==
Weber ended his research of society and religion in India by bringing in insights from his previous work on China to discuss similarities of the Asian belief systems. He notes that the beliefs saw the meaning of life as otherworldy mystical experience. The social world is fundamentally divided between the educated elite, following the guidance of a prophet or wise man, and the uneducated masses whose beliefs are centered on magic. In Asia, there was no Messianic prophecy to plan and meaning to the everyday life of educated and uneducated alike. Weber juxtaposed such Messianic prophecies, notably from the Near East region to those found on the Asiatic mainland, focusing more on exemplary ways to live one's life. It was those differences that prevented the countries of the Occident from following the paths of the earlier Chinese and Indian civilizations. His next work, Ancient Judaism was an attempt to prove this theory.

== See also ==
- Outline of Hinduism
- Index of Buddhism-related articles
- Sociology of religion
- Secularism in India
- Secular Buddhism
