= The Protestant Ethic and the Spirit of Capitalism =

1905 sociology book by Max Weber

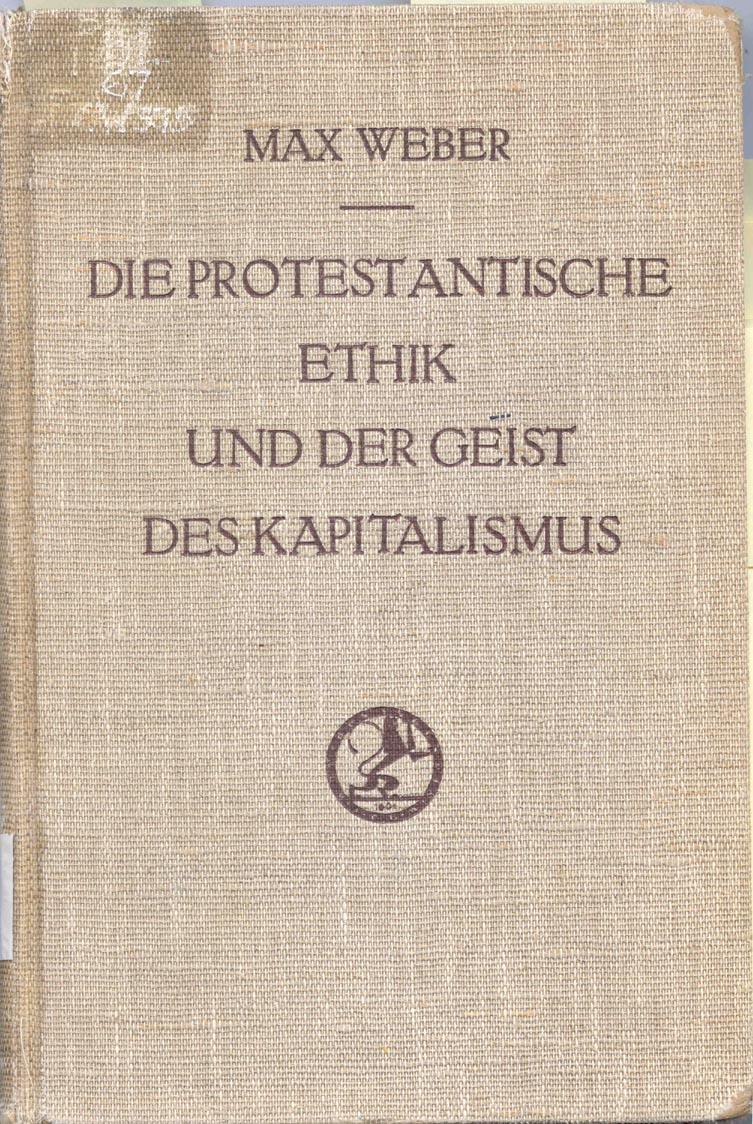
- Cover of the German edition from 1934
- Author: Max Weber
- Original title: Die protestantische Ethik und der Geist des Kapitalismus
- Language: German
- Genre: Economic sociology
- Publication date: 1904–05
- Publication place: Germany
- Text: The Protestant Ethic and the Spirit of Capitalism at Wikisource

The Protestant Ethic and the Spirit of Capitalism (German: Die protestantische Ethik und der Geist des Kapitalismus) is a book written by Max Weber, a German sociologist, economist, and politician. First written as a series of essays, the original German text was published in 1904 and 1905 in Archiv für Sozialwissenschaft und Sozialpolitik, and was translated into English for the first time by American sociologist Talcott Parsons in 1930. It is considered a founding text in economic sociology and a milestone contribution to sociological thought in general.

In the book, Weber wrote that capitalism in Northern Europe evolved when the Protestant (particularly Calvinist) ethic influenced large numbers of people to engage in work in the secular world, developing their own enterprises and engaging in trade and the accumulation of wealth for investment. In other words, the Protestant work ethic was an important influence on the emergence of modern capitalism. In his book, apart from Calvinists, Weber also discusses Lutherans (especially Pietists, but also notes differences between traditional Lutherans and Calvinists), Methodists, Baptists, Quakers, and Moravians (specifically referring to the Herrnhut-based community under Count von Zinzendorf's spiritual lead).

In 1998, the International Sociological Association listed this work as the fourth most important sociological book of the 20th century, after Weber's Economy and Society, C. Wright Mills' The Sociological Imagination, and Robert K. Merton's Social Theory and Social Structure. It is the eighth most cited book in the social sciences published before 1950.

== Summary ==
=== Basic concepts ===
Although not a detailed study of Protestantism but rather an introduction to Weber's later studies of interaction between various religious ideas and economics (The Religion of China: Confucianism and Taoism 1915, The Religion of India: The Sociology of Hinduism and Buddhism 1916, and Ancient Judaism 1917), The Protestant Ethic and the Spirit of Capitalism argues that Puritan ethics and ideas influenced the development of capitalism. The 'spirit of capitalism' does not refer to the spirit in the metaphysical sense but rather a set of values, the spirit of hard work and progress.

Religious devotion, Weber argues, is usually accompanied by a rejection of worldly affairs, including the pursuit of wealth and possessions. To illustrate his theory, Weber quotes the ethical writings of Benjamin Franklin:

Remember, that time is money. He that can earn ten shillings a day by his labor, and goes abroad, or sits idle, one half of that day, though he spends but sixpence during his diversion or idleness, ought not to reckon that the only expense; he has really spent, or rather thrown away, five shillings besides. [...] Remember, that money is the prolific, generating nature. Money can beget money, and its offspring can beget more, and so on. Five shillings turned is six, turned again is seven and threepence, and so on, till it becomes a hundred pounds. The more there is of it, the more it produces every turning, so that the profits rise quicker and quicker. He that kills a breeding-sow, destroys all her offspring to the thousandth generation. He that murders a crown, destroys all that it might have produced, even scores of pounds.

Weber notes that this is not a philosophy of mere greed, but a statement laden with moral language. Indeed, Franklin claims that God revealed the usefulness of virtue to him.

The Reformation profoundly affected the view of work, dignifying even the most mundane professions as adding to the common good and thus blessed by God, as much as any "sacred" calling (German: Ruf). A common illustration is that of a cobbler, hunched over his work, who devotes his entire effort to the praise of God.

To emphasize the work ethic in Protestantism relative to Catholics, he notes a common problem that industrialists face when employing precapitalist laborers: Agricultural entrepreneurs will try to encourage time spent harvesting by offering a higher wage, with the expectation that laborers will see time spent working as more valuable and so engage it longer. However, in precapitalist societies this often results in laborers spending less time harvesting. Laborers judge that they can earn the same, while spending less time working and having more leisure. He also notes that societies having more Protestants are those that have a more developed capitalist economy.

It is particularly advantageous in technical occupations for workers to be extremely devoted to their craft. To view the craft as an end in itself, or as a "calling" would serve this need well. This attitude is well-noted in certain classes which have endured religious education, especially of a Pietist background.

He defines the spirit of capitalism as the ideas and esprit that favour the rational pursuit of economic gain: "We shall nevertheless provisionally use the expression 'spirit of capitalism' for that attitude which, in the pursuit of a calling [berufsmäßig], strives systematically for profit for its own sake in the manner exemplified by Benjamin Franklin."

Weber points out that such a spirit is not limited to Western culture if one considers it as the attitude of individuals, but that such individuals – heroic entrepreneurs, as he calls them – could not by themselves establish a new economic order (capitalism). He further noted that the spirit of capitalism could be divorced from religion, and that those passionate capitalists of his era were either passionate against the Church or at least indifferent to it. Desire for profit with minimum effort and seeing work as a burden to be avoided, and doing no more than what was enough for modest life, were common attitudes. As he wrote in his essays:

In order that a manner of life well adapted to the peculiarities of the capitalism… could come to dominate others, it had to originate somewhere, and not in isolated individuals alone, but as a way of life common to the whole groups of man.

After defining the "spirit of capitalism," Weber argues that there are many reasons to find its origins in the religious ideas of the Reformation. Many others like William Petty, Montesquieu, Henry Thomas Buckle, John Keats have noted the affinity between Protestantism and the development of commercialism.

Weber shows that certain branches of Protestantism had supported worldly activities dedicated to economic gain, seeing them as endowed with moral and spiritual significance. This recognition was not a goal in itself; rather they were a byproduct of other doctrines of faith that encouraged planning, hard work and self-denial in the pursuit of worldly riches.

=== Origins of the Protestant work ethic ===
Weber traced the origins of the Protestant ethic to the Reformation, though he acknowledged some respect for secular everyday labor as early as the Middle Ages. The Roman Catholic Church assured salvation to individuals who accepted the church's sacraments and submitted to the clerical authority. However, the Reformation had effectively removed such assurances. From a psychological viewpoint, the average person had difficulty adjusting to this new worldview, and only the most devout believers or "religious geniuses" within Protestantism, such as Martin Luther, were able to make this adjustment, according to Weber.

In the absence of such assurances from religious authority, Weber argued that Protestants began to look for other "signs" that they were saved. Calvin and his followers taught a doctrine of double predestination, in which from the beginning God chose some people for salvation and others for damnation. The inability to influence one's own salvation presented a very difficult problem for Calvin's followers, who, in Weber's view, considered it an absolute duty to believe that one was chosen for salvation and to dispel any doubt about that: lack of self-confidence was evidence of insufficient faith and a sign of damnation. So, self-confidence took the place of priestly assurance of God's grace.

Worldly success became one measure of that self-confidence. Luther made an early endorsement of Europe's emerging divisions. Weber identifies the applicability of Luther's conclusions, noting that a "vocation" from God was no longer limited to the clergy or church, but applied to any occupation or trade. Weber had always detested Lutheranism for the servility it inspired toward the bureaucratic state. When he discussed it in the Protestant Ethic, he used Lutheranism as the chief example of the unio mystica that contrasted sharply with the ascetic posture. Later he would associate "Luther, the symbolic exponent of bureaucratic despotism, with the ascetic hostility to Eros — an example of Weber's sporadic tendency to link together bureaucratic and ascetic modes of life and to oppose both from mystical and aristocratic perspectives."

However, Weber saw the fulfillment of the Protestant ethic not in Lutheranism, which was too concerned with the reception of divine spirit in the soul, but in Calvinistic forms of Christianity. The trend was carried further still in Pietism. The Baptists diluted the concept of the calling relative to Calvinists, but other aspects made its congregants fertile soil for the development of capitalism—namely, a lack of paralyzing ascetism, the refusal to accept state office and thereby develop unpolitically, and the doctrine of control by conscience which caused rigorous honesty.

What Weber argued, in simple terms:

- According to the new Protestant religions, an individual was religiously compelled to follow a secular vocation (German: Beruf) with as much zeal as possible. A person living according to this world view was more likely to accumulate money.
- The new religions (in particular, Calvinism and other more austere Protestant sects) effectively forbade wastefully using hard earned money and identified the purchase of luxuries as a sin. Donations to an individual's church or congregation were limited due to the rejection by certain Protestant sects of icons. Finally, donation of money to the poor or to charity was generally frowned on as it was seen as furthering beggary. This social condition was perceived as laziness, burdening their fellow man, and an affront to God; by not working, one failed to glorify God.

The manner in which this dilemma was resolved, Weber argued, was the investment of this money, which gave an extreme boost to nascent capitalism.

=== Protestant work ethic in Weber's time ===
By the time Weber wrote his essay, he believed that the religious underpinnings of the Protestant ethic had largely gone from society. He cited the writings of Benjamin Franklin, which emphasized frugality, hard work and thrift, but were mostly free of spiritual content. Weber also attributed the success of mass production partly to the Protestant ethic. Only after expensive luxuries were disdained could individuals accept the uniform products, such as clothes and furniture, that industrialization offered.

In his conclusion to the book, Weber lamented that the loss of religious underpinning to capitalism's spirit has led to a kind of involuntary servitude to mechanized industry.

The Puritan wanted to work in calling; we are forced to do so. For when asceticism was carried out of monastic cells into everyday life, and began to dominate worldly morality, it did its part in building the tremendous cosmos of the modern economic order. This order is now bound to the technical and economic conditions of machine production which today determine the lives of all the individuals who are born into this mechanism, not only those directly concerned with economic acquisition, with irresistible force. Perhaps it will so determine them until the last ton of fossilized coal is burnt. In Baxter's view the care for external goods should only lie on the shoulders of the 'saint like a light cloak, which can be thrown aside at any moment.' But fate decreed that the cloak should become an iron cage. (Page 181, 1953 Scribner's edition.)

Weber maintained that while Puritan religious ideas had significantly impacted the development of economic systems in Europe and United States, there were other factors in play, as well. They included a closer relationship between mathematics and observation, the enhanced value of scholarship, rational systematization of government administration, and an increase in entrepreneurship ventures. In the end, the study of Protestant ethic, according to Weber, investigated a part of the detachment from magic, that disenchantment of the world that could be seen as a unique characteristic of Western culture.

=== Conclusions ===
In the final endnotes Weber states that he abandoned research into Protestantism because his colleague Ernst Troeltsch, a professional theologian, had begun work on The Social Teachings of the Christian Churches and Sects. Another reason for Weber's decision was that Troeltsch's work already achieved what he desired in that area, which is laying groundwork for comparative analysis of religion and society. Weber moved beyond Protestantism with his research but would continue research into sociology of religion within his later works (the study of Judaism and the religions of China and India).

This book is also Weber's first brush with the concept of rationalization. His idea of modern capitalism as growing out of the religious pursuit of wealth meant a change to a rational means of existence, wealth. That is to say, at some point the Calvinist rationale informing the "spirit" of capitalism became unreliant on the underlying religious movement behind it, leaving only rational capitalism. In essence then, Weber's "Spirit of Capitalism" is effectively and more broadly a Spirit of Rationalization.

== Reception ==
The essay can also be interpreted as one of Weber's criticism of Karl Marx and his theories. While Marx's historical materialism held that all human institutions – including religion – were based on economic foundations, many have seen The Protestant Ethic as turning this theory on its head by implying that a religious movement fostered capitalism, not the other way around.

Other scholars have taken a more nuanced view of Weber's argument. Weber states in the closing of this essay, "it is, of course, not my aim to substitute for a one-sided materialistic an equally one-sided spiritualistic causal interpretation of culture and history. Each is equally possible, but each if it does not serve as the preparation, but as the conclusion of an investigation, accomplishes equally little in the interest of historical truth." Weber's argument can be understood as an attempt to deepen the understanding of the cultural origins of capitalism, which does not exclude the historical materialist origins described by Marx: modern capitalism emerged from an elective affinity of 'material' and 'ideal' factors.

== Table of contents ==
Table of contents from the 1958 Scribner's edition, with section titles added by Talcott Parsons:

- Part 1. The Problem
  I. Religious Affiliation and Social Stratification
  II. The Spirit of Capitalism
  III. Luther's Conception of the Calling. Task of the Investigation.
- Part 2. The Practical Ethics of the Ascetic Branches of Protestantism.
  IV. The Religious Foundations of Worldly Asceticism
  A. Calvinism
  Predestination; Elimination of Magic; Rationalization of the World; Certainty of Salvation; Lutheranism vs. Calvinism; Catholicism vs. Calvinism; Monasticism vs. Puritanism; Methodical Ethic; Idea of Proof.
  B. Pietism
  Emotionalism; Spener; Francke; Zinzendorf; German Pietism.
  C. Methodism
  D. The Baptism Sects
  Baptist and Quaker; Sect Principle; Inner Worldly Asceticism; Transformation of the World.
  V. Asceticism and the Spirit of Capitalism
  Richard Baxter; Meaning of Work; Justification of Profit; Jewish vs. Puritan Capitalism; Puritanism and Culture; Saving and Capital; Paradox of Asceticism and Rich; Serving Both Worlds; Citizenry Capitalistic Ethic; Iron Cage of Capitalism.

== Criticism ==
=== Methodology ===
Weber's causal claim that the Protestant ethic led to capitalism has been criticized for endogeneity problems and case selection problems. Rather than Protestantism leading to capitalism, it may be the case that individuals and communities who were more prone to capitalism were also more likely to adopt Protestantism.

=== Economic criticism ===
The economist and historian Henryk Grossman criticises Weber's analysis on two fronts. Firstly, Grossman refers to Karl Marx's work to show that the stringent legal measures that were taken against poverty and vagabondage were a reaction to the massive population shifts caused by the enclosure of the commons, which evicted many peasants from the common land on which they had lived. Secondly, Grossman's own work shows how this "bloody legislation" against evicted peasants was implemented across Europe, especially in France. Grossman asserts that this legislation physically forced people from serfdom into wage-labor. This history is unrelated to Protestantism. Thus, capitalism came about largely by force, and not by any vocational training regarding an inner-worldliness of Protestantism. It remains possible that the "Protestant work ethic" socially legitimized or otherwise reinforced the legal measures that Grossman details, within a larger cultural context.

In a 2015 study, Davide Cantoni tested Weber's Protestant hypothesis on German cities over the period 1300–1900, finding no effects of Protestantism on economic growth.

Historian Laurence R. Iannaccone has written that "Ironically, the most noteworthy feature of the Protestant Ethic thesis is its absence of empirical support", citing the work of Swedish economic historian Kurt Samuelsson that "economic progress was uncorrelated with religion, or was temporally incompatible with Weber's thesis, or actually reversed the pattern claimed by Weber."

Other recent scholarship has found some valid Protestant ethic effects both in historical and contemporary development patterns. Dudley and Blum, using city growth as a proxy for wages growth, write:

Evidence of falling wages in Catholic cities and rising wages in Protestant cities between 1500 and 1750, during the spread of literacy in the vernacular, is inconsistent with most theoretical models of economic growth. In The Protestant Ethic, Weber suggested an alternative explanation based on culture. Here, a theoretical model confirms that a small change in the subjective cost of cooperating with strangers can generate a profound transformation in trading networks. … A re-examination of Weber’s Protestant Ethic indicates that what was important for long-term economic growth was not a greater propensity to save and work of individual Protestants but rather the manner in which a group of Protestants interacted compared with a group of Catholics.

— Ulrich Blum & Leonard Dudley, ‘Religion and Economic Growth: Was Weber Right?’, Journal of Evolutionary Economics, vol. 11, no. 2 (Feb. 2001): 207–30

Daron Acemoglu and James A. Robinson in their book Why Nations Fail reject the relationship between economic progress and Protestantism writing:

What about Max Weber’s Protestant ethic? Though it may be true that predominantly Protestant countries, such as the Netherlands and England, were the first economic successes of the modern era, there is little relationship between religion and economic success. France, a predominantly Catholic country, quickly mimicked the economic performance of the Dutch and English in the nineteenth century, and Italy is as prosperous as any of these nations today. Looking farther east, you’ll see that none of the economic successes of East Asia have anything to do with any form of Christian religion, so there is not much support for a special relationship between Protestantism and economic success there, either.

=== Revisionist criticism ===
Hector Menteith Robertson, in his book Aspects of Economic Individualism (1933), argued against the historical and religious claims of Weber. Robertson pointed out that capitalism began to flourish not in Britain, but in 14th-century Italy, so the rise of capitalism cannot be attributed to Adam Smith, the Protestant Reformation, etc. Robertson goes further, and states that what happened in Britain was rather a retrogression from what was achieved in Italy centuries earlier.

Robertson shows that Adam Smith and David Ricardo did not found economic science de novo. In fact, liberal economic theory was developed by French and Italian Catholics, who were influenced by the Scholastics. According to other critics, British economic thought was rather a step backwards since it espoused the labor theory of value, which had been critiqued by the School of Salamanca.

=== Other criticism ===
It has recently been suggested that Protestantism has indeed influenced positively the capitalist development of respective social systems not so much through the "Protestant ethics" but rather through the promotion of literacy. Sascha Becker and Ludger Wossmann of LMU Munich showed that literacy levels differing in religious areas can sufficiently explain the economic gaps cited by Weber. The results were supported even under a concentric diffusion model of Protestantism using distance from Wittenberg as a model.

Weber's conclusion has also been criticized for ignoring the ethnic dimensions. Weber focused on religion, but ignored the fact that Germany contained a large Polish minority (due to the partitions of Poland); and Poles were primarily Catholic and Germans, Protestant. As such, scholars have suggested that what Weber observed was in fact "anti-Polish discrimination" visible in the different levels of income, savings and literacy between Germans and Poles.

The noted French historian Fernand Braudel, considered one of the greatest of the modern historians, vigorously criticized Weber's theory, noting its lack of foundation and veracity, stating:

All historians have opposed this tenuous theory, although they have not managed to be rid of it once and for all. Yet it is clearly false. The northern countries took over the place that earlier had so long and so brilliantly been occupied by the old capitalist centers of the Mediterranean. They invented nothing, either in technology or in business management. Amsterdam copied Venice, as London would subsequently copy Amsterdam, and as New York would one day copy London.

== Support ==
In 1958, American sociologist Gerhard Lenski conducted an empirical inquiry into "religion's impact on politics, economics, and family life" in the Detroit, Mich., area. It revealed, among other insights, that there were significant differences between Catholics on the one hand and (white) Protestants and Jews on the other hand with respect to economics and the sciences. Lenski's data supported basic hypotheses of Weber's work The Protestant Ethic and the Spirit of Capitalism. According to Lenski, "the contribution of Protestantism to material progress have been largely unintended by-products of certain distinctive Protestant traits. This was a central point in Weber's theory." Lenski noted that more than a hundred years prior to Weber, John Wesley, one of the founders of the Methodist church, had observed that "diligence and frugality" made Methodists wealthy. "In an early era, Protestant asceticism and dedication to work, as noted both by Wesley and Weber, seem to have been important patterns of action contributing to economic progress. Both facilitated the accumulation of capital, so critically important to the economic growth and development of nations."

German theologian Friedrich Wilhelm Graf notes: "Sociologists of religion like Peter L. Berger and David Martin have interpreted the Protestant revolution in Latin America as implicit support of basic elements of Weber's thesis. [...] At any rate, many pious persons there interpret their transition from the Roman Catholic church to Protestant Pentecostal congregations in terms of a moral idea that promises long-term economic gains through strong innerworldly asceticism. The strict ascetic self-discipline that has been successfully institutionalized in the Pentecostal congregations, the readiness to work more and with greater effort and to take less leisurely attitudes lead many Pentecostal Christians to believe that their new faith in God is supported by their economic successes."

In a journal article published in 2019, scholar of religion Benjamin Kirby critiques Peter L. Berger's analysis for its over-emphasis on the influence of Holiness-oriented Pentecostal churches, neglecting the growing influence of neo-Pentecostal churches across the globe. Kirby argues that it is difficult to draw parallels between contemporary neo-Pentecostals and Weber's ascetic Protestants, specifically because the former group of practitioners, many of whom espouse Prosperity theologies, often do not exhibit the same commitment to "sober economic virtue" and "rational bourgeois economic life" as Weber's Calvinistic Puritans. Nevertheless, Kirby stresses that Weber's text remains important for understanding enduring affinities between Christianity and capitalism. Kirby posits a "new elective affinity" between contemporary Pentecostalism and neoliberal capitalism, suggesting that neo-Pentecostal churches may act as vehicles for embedding neoliberal economic processes, for instance by encouraging practitioners to become entrepreneurial, responsibilised citizens.

== See also ==
- Anglo-Saxon economy
- Disenchantment
- Iron cage
- Merton thesis
- Prosperity theology
- Protestant work ethic
- Rationalization
- Social evolutionism
