= Vogelstein =

Vogelstein is a surname. Notable people with the surname include:

- Bert Vogelstein (born 1949), an American Howard Hughes Medical Institute investigator at The Johns Hopkins University
- Carl Christian Vogel von Vogelstein (1788–1868), German painter
- Rabbi Heinemann Vogelstein (1841–1911), German liberal rabbi
  - Rabbi Hermann Vogelstein (1870–1942), German-American historian, liberal rabbi
  - Ludwig Vogelstein (1871–1934), German-American industrialist and philanthropist
  - Theodor Vogelstein (1880–1957), banker and industrialist
  - Julie Braun-Vogelstein (1883–1971), German-American art historian, author, editor, and journalist
