= Otto Braun (poet) =

German poet

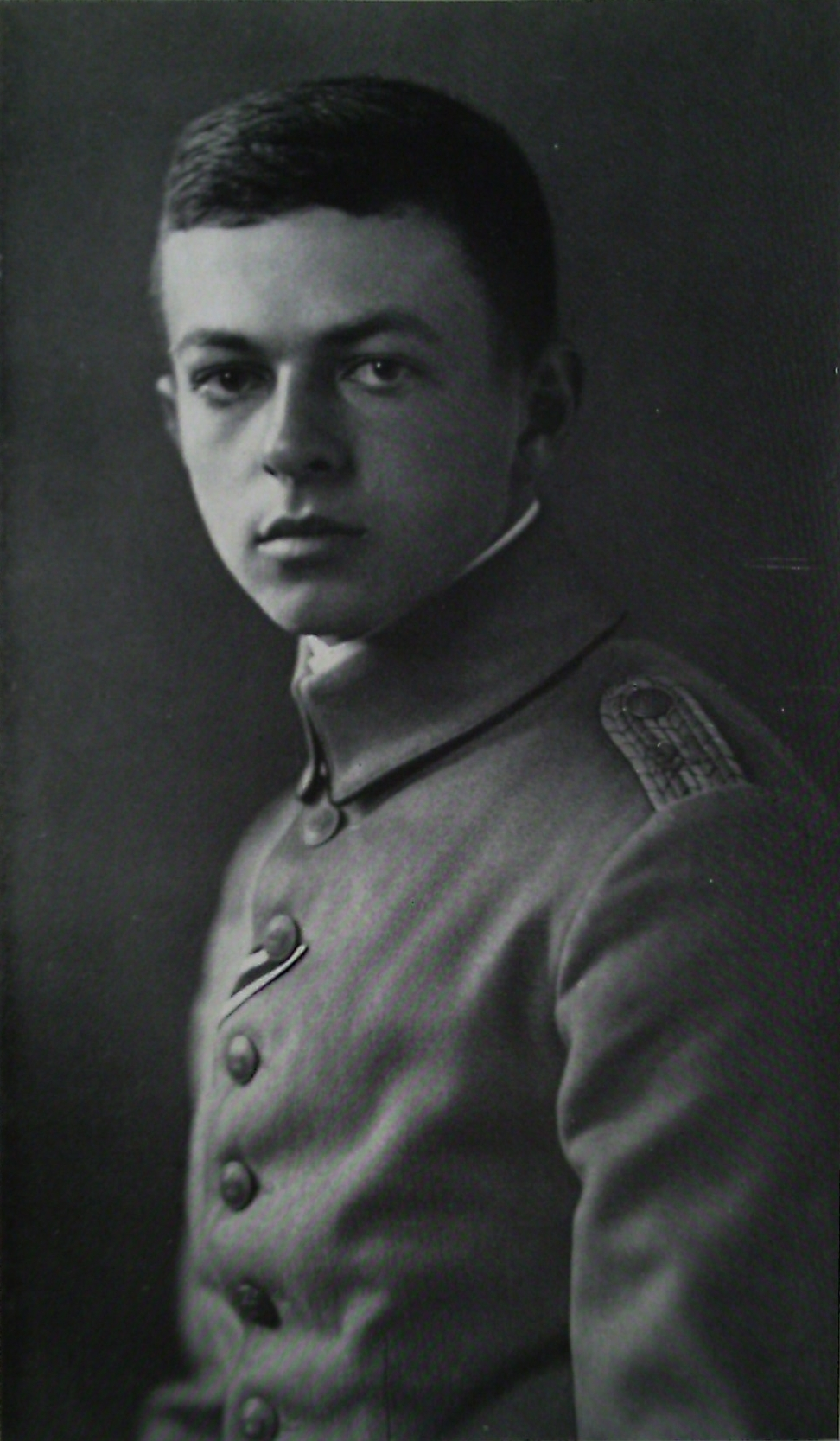
- Otto Braun as an Orderly decorated with Iron Cross, 1917/18
- Born: 27 June 1897; Berlin, Province of Brandenburg, German Empire
- Died: 29 April 1918 (aged 20); Marcelcave, Somme, France
- Occupations: Poet, Soldier
- Writing career
- Language: German

Otto Braun (27 June (Note: In the preface of his mother Lily Braun's autobiography published in 1908, Memoirs of a Socialist. Lehrjahre, Kampfjahre, June 24 is given as Otto Braun's birthday. In the published casualty list of the Reserve Jäger Battalion No. 21, however, June 27 is recorded as his birthday.) 1897 – 29 April (Note: In the published casualty list of the Reserve Jäger Battalion No. 21 lists April 27, 1918 as the date of death of Leutnant Otto Braun (1st Company).) 1918) was a German poet. During his lifetime, only one poem of his was published: Nachmittag an der Bzura appeared in 1915 in the patriotic magazine Wieland, without his knowledge or consent. After World War I however, his works were published posthumously in Germany, Great Britain, and the United States, amassing popularity and even becoming a bestseller in Germany. He was praised by authors such as Rudolf Borchardt, Hugo von Hofmannsthal and Rudolf Alexander Schröder.

== Biography ==
=== Early life ===
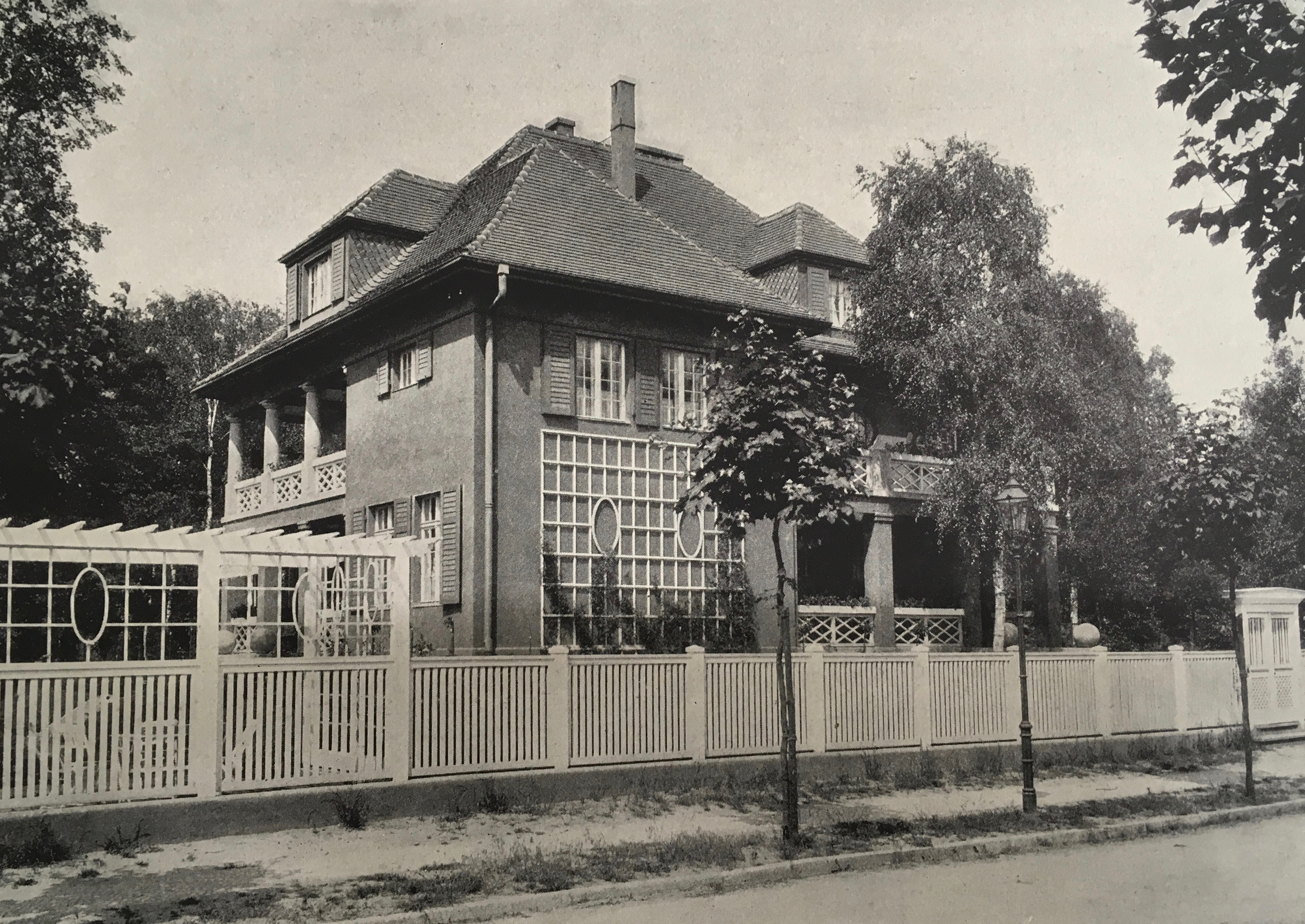
The villa of the Braun family in Kleinmachnow near Berlin, built in 1909

The only son born of journalist, writer and social democratic women's rights activist Lily Braun and the social democratic politician and publicist Heinrich Braun, Otto was considered a "child prodigy" and admired the poet Stefan George.

After initially attending school in Berlin, from April 1907 to the end of September 1908 he attended the Landerziehungsheim Freie Schulgemeinde in Wickersdorf near Saalfeld in the Thuringian Forest, where he became friends with his classmate Otto Gründler, three and a half years his senior. Introverted from a young age, Braun stood out due to his extraordinary erudition. This gave his adult contemporaries the impression of an "overbearing precociousness." During this boarding school stay, he became involved in the simmering conflict between principal Paul Geheeb and the spiritus rector of the country school, Gustav Wyneken. The resulting everyday tensions caused the young Braun a large amount of trouble. When he took up with Geheeb's position, Wyneken regarded Braun as an opponent and treated him accordingly. He suffered from mood swings, isolating himself from his classmates and retreating into solitude, where he developed poems as well as fantasies. On 6 February 1908, Braun characterized Wyneken in a letter to his mother as the "embodiment of all intrigue". He also reported that Wyneken chose certain favorites among the male students whom he preferred.

In Gustav Wyneken's estate in the Archive of the German Youth Movement, a copy of Otto Braun's posthumous lyrical works and diaries published in 1919 were later found. In it, Wyneken had commented in handwriting: "It is significant that so much fuss is being made about this book, as it is ideally suited as an example of mediocrity... Open any page! G. W."

Braun found the lack of time and peace for his self-study unbearable during his time at boarding school. On September 2, 1908, he wrote to his mother:

"I just can't get into a good mood, because it can only be brought about by immersing myself with you. But there is no time for that. [...] Now I have a very strange feeling that I have never had before. I don't feel at home in Wickersdorf. I swear to you, with all that is sacred to us, with all that is beautiful and good, with all that is true in the world, that this feeling is not because I wanted to go to Berlin. I have it, there's no helping it now. It is mainly a feeling, of course, but there is also a rational reason: W. [Wyneken] gave a speech on the Wickersdorf world view at the foundation festival the day before yesterday. Something has changed, either I have changed or the others have changed; I think I have changed. [...] And this too: I cannot strengthen my will and my character here".

In the same month, he attempted to escape from the boarding school, but this attempt ended at the train station in Saalfeld. This cry for help reached his parents, who then deregistered him from the Freie Schulgemeinde. Lily Braun personally picked up her son from there. In Spandau near Berlin, he began attending the Königliches Gymnasium before finally being taught by personal tutors.

=== The seeds of a poet ===
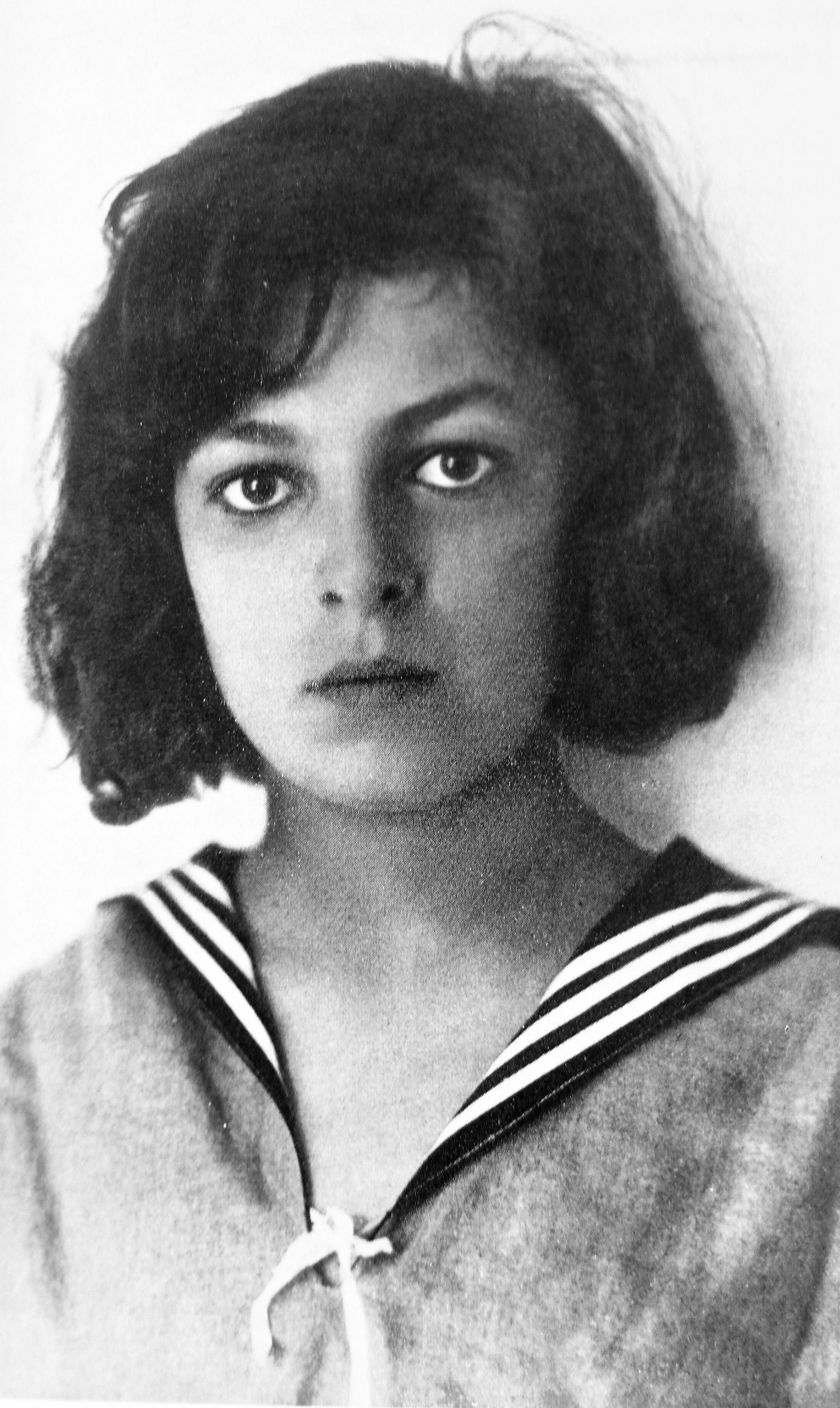
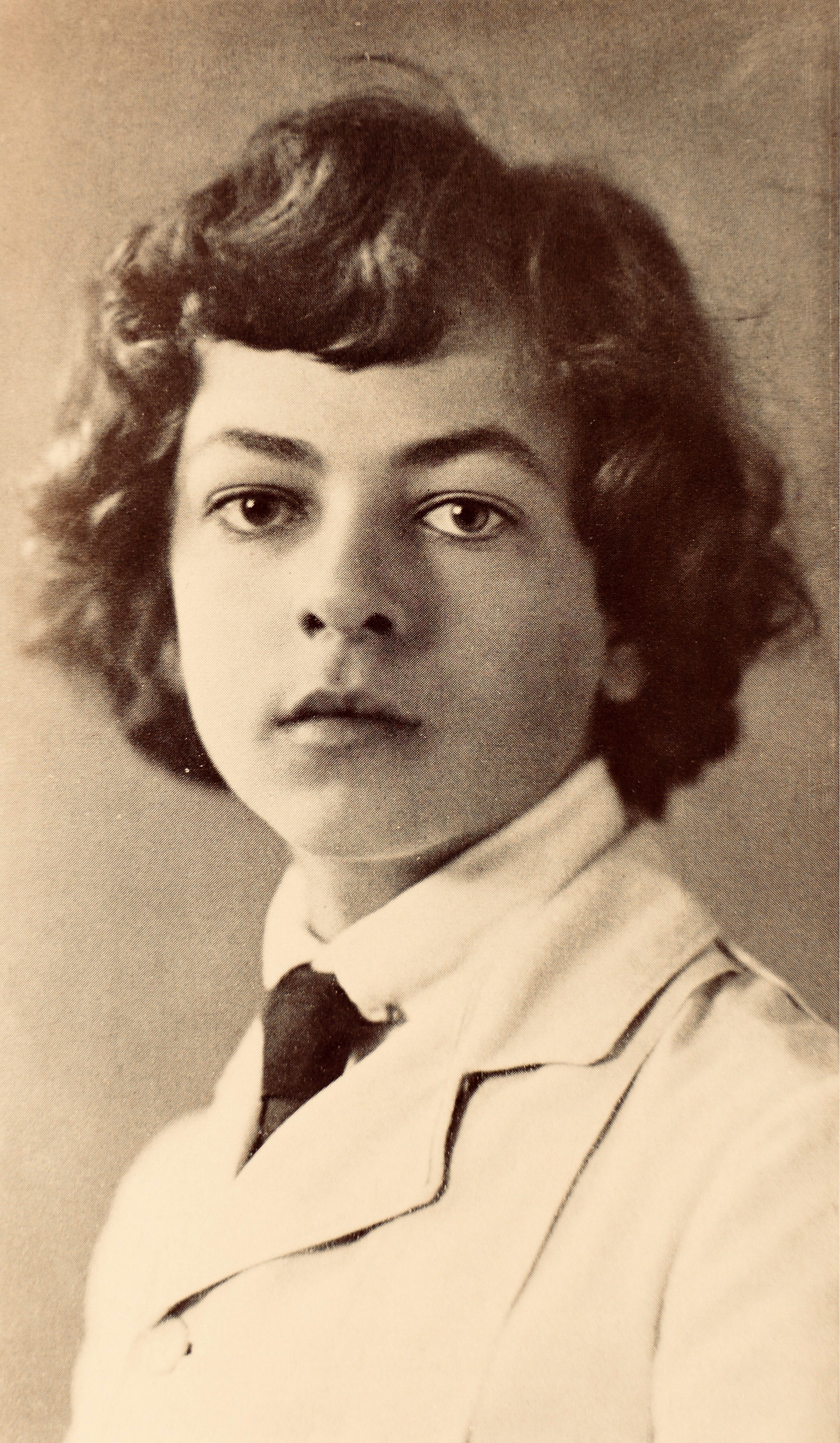
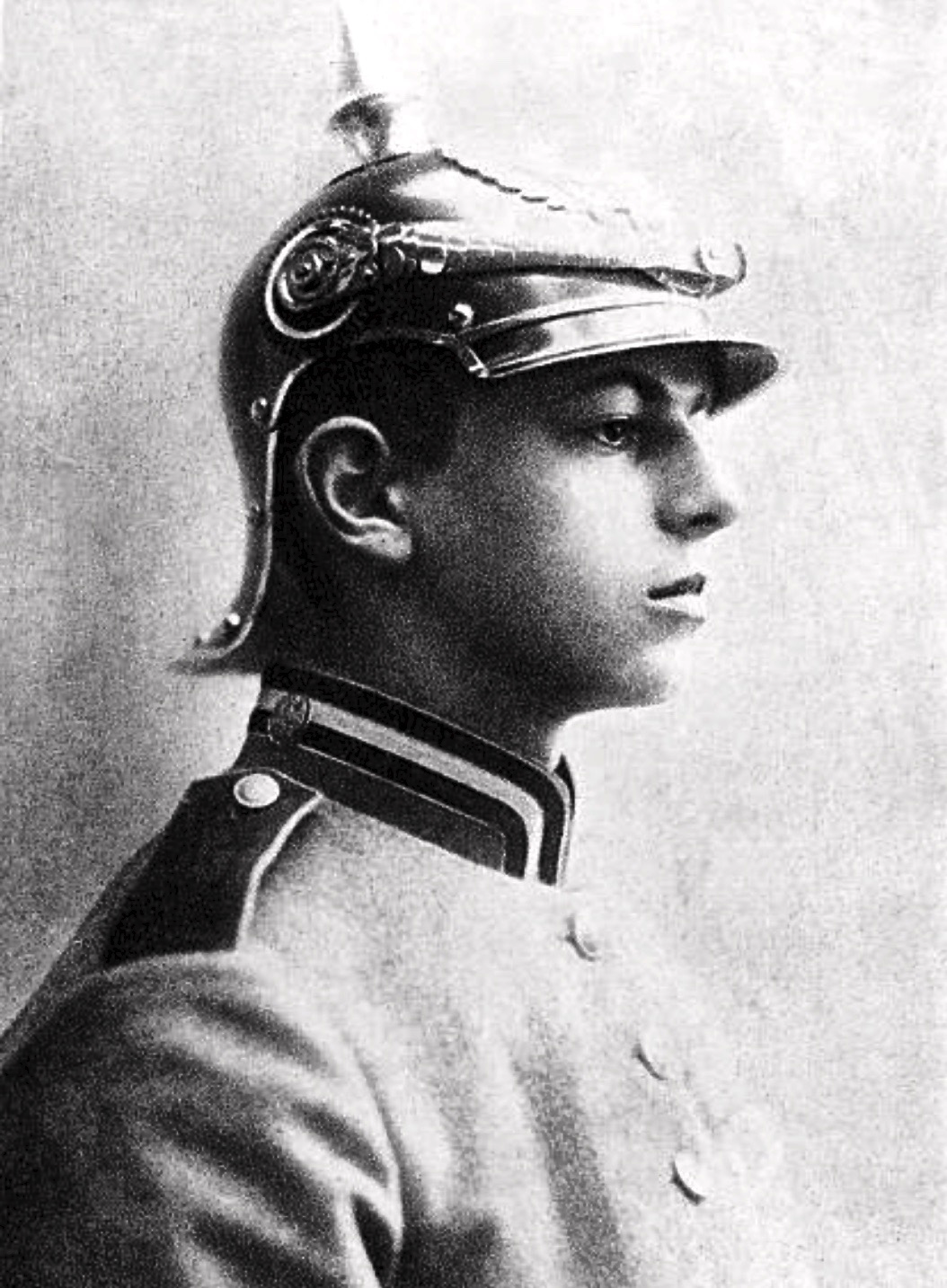
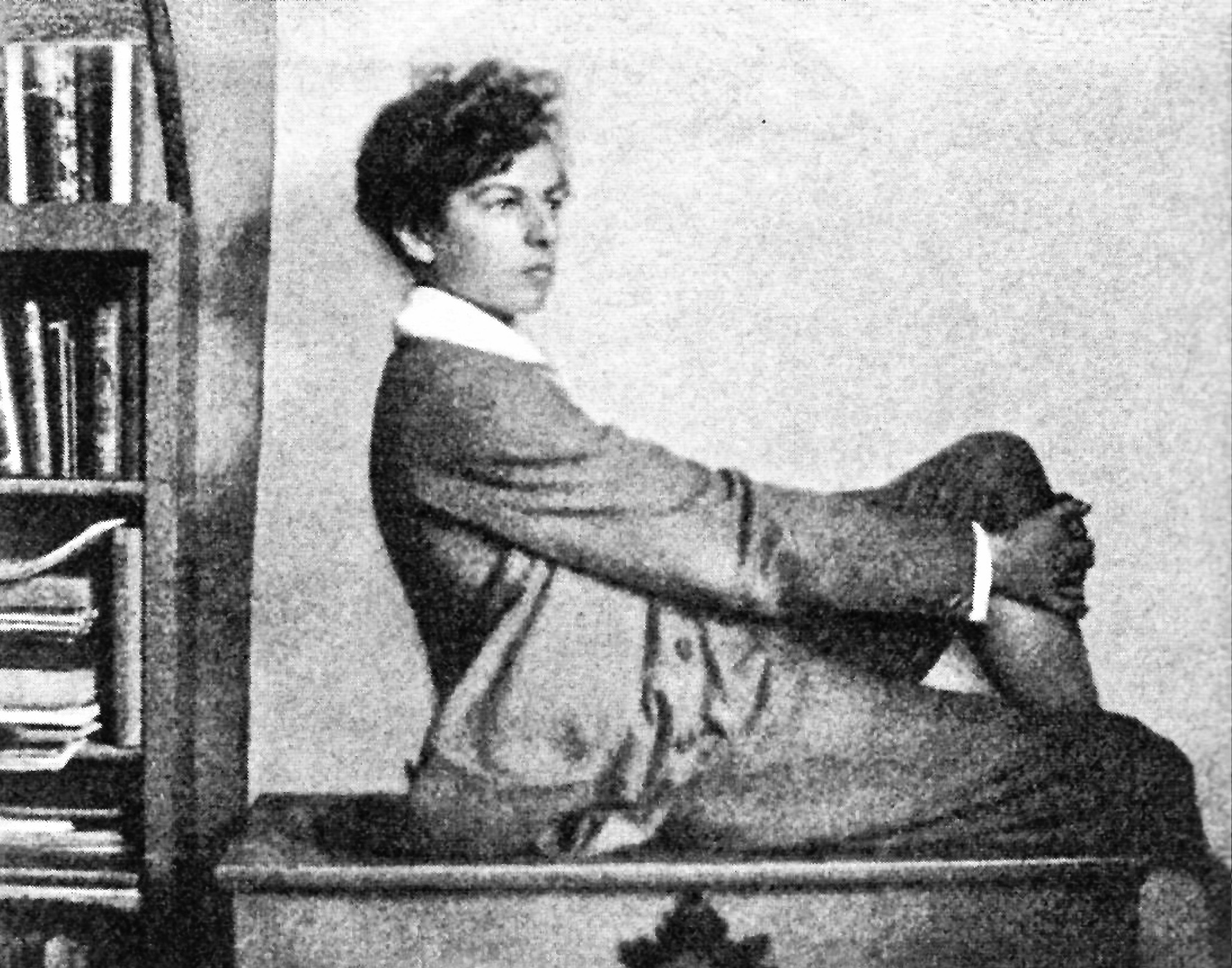
Otto Braun, aged clockwise from upper left at 11, 14, 16, and 17.

His parents and teachers thought he was highly gifted. Therefore, Dr. Joseph Petzoldt, head teacher at the Königliches Gymnasium zu Spandau and private lecturer at the Technische Hochschule Charlottenburg, author of Sonderschulen für hervorragend Befähigte, applied to the Ministry of Spiritual, Educational and Medical Affairs on December 8, 1909, at the to be partially released from teaching duties and entrusted with the private instruction of the then twelve-year-old pupil. Petzoldt had personally convinced himself through several hours of discussions and careful reading of several of Braun's works "[...] that his talent was in no way overestimated, indeed that it is quite astonishing and wonderful." He reported that Otto Braun had already learned Middle High German in order to be able to read the Germanic heroic songs in the original, and Greek for the sake of the Pre-Socratics. Petzoldt's application met with incomprehension from the authorities and was rejected on March 17, 1910.

Even as a child, Otto Braun frequented the home of the painter and salonnière Sabine Lepsius and her husband, the Impressionist portrait painter Reinhold Lepsiusm which gave him access to the Berlin George-Kreis. Both were friends with Käthe Kollwitz, as was his mother Lily. Lily Braun exchanged ideas with Käthe Kollwitz about her own and her two sons Hans and Peter. Together with Stefan Lepsius (1897–1917), who was the same age and owed his first name to his admiration of Stefan George, they were privately tutored by Herman Schmalenbach. In July 1914, Braun came into contact with the sociologist and national economist Alfred Weber and his students in Heidelberg, as well as with the national economist and writer Elisabeth Salomon, the later wife of Friedrich Gundolf.

=== The Great War ===
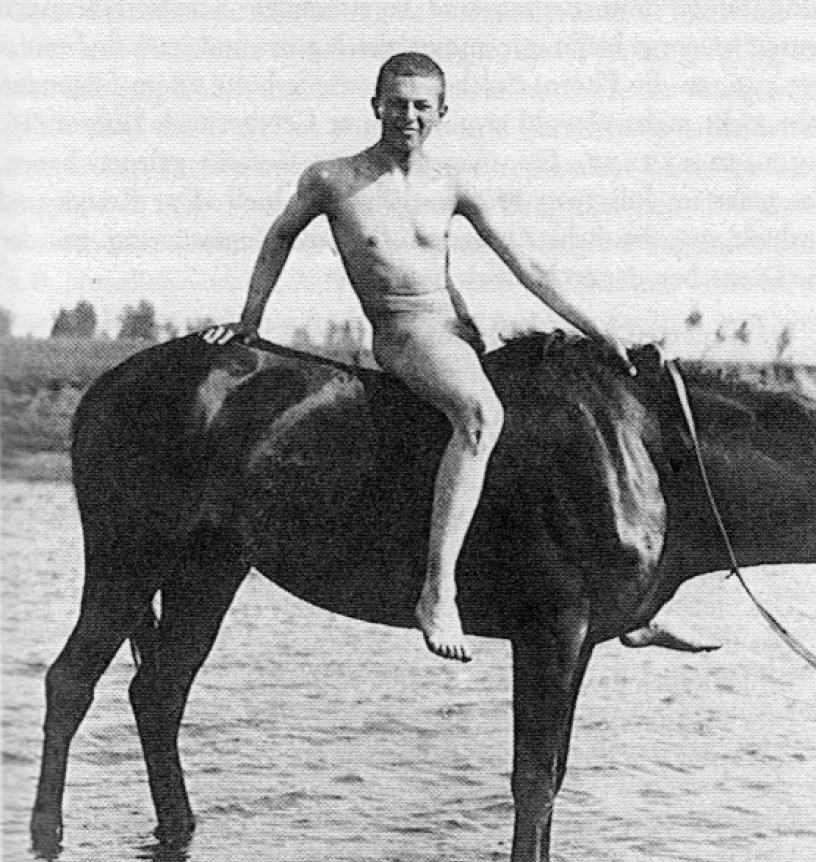
Otto Braun as a Fahnenjunker and dispatch rider in Poland, 1915, where he would write Nachmittag an der Bzura.

After the German Empire declared war on August 1, 1914, he enlisted as a 17-year-old in September 1914. As a dispatch rider in the replacement escadron of the Jäger-Regiment zu Pferde Nr. 4, which belonged to the XVII. Armee-Korps of the 8. Armee, the Fahnenjunker was initially deployed on the Eastern Front in Poland. There in 1915, amidst the dirt of the trenches, he wrote in his diary: "It is just so wonderfully beautiful, beautiful, beautiful, despite the horror of what I have just seen here". He underlined the adjective "beautiful", which he repeated three times. On August 5, 1915, he wrote to his parents in a field post letter: "At eight o'clock we entered Warsaw with the division. It was a rush that cannot be described". On August 13, 1915, he reported to his parents: "What I have gained in experience in every respect during this short period of real war! I notice that certain important aspects of a person can only be clearly recognized in the fire, where many things fall away and strange things emerge".

After being seriously wounded in the arm in 1916, he worked for about a year in the military office of the Auswärtiges Amt. On the side, he attended an officer training course in Döberitz. During this time, Braun came into contact with the authors Rudolf Borchardt and Friedrich Gundolf. Borchardt subsequently became Braun's mentor, to whom he also submitted his early literary works for review and assessment. Braun unilaterally fell in love with the Berlin dancer and actress Katta Sterna, a niece of Käthe Kollwitz, but Borchardt finally managed to dissuade Braun from this unpromising love affair during a heated conversation, because she was in a relationship with Ernst Matray.

From November 13 to December 12, 1917, Otto Braun was accommodated in the military hospital in Schloss Neubeuern through the mediation of Lieutenant Colonel Herwarth von Bittenfeld, where he signed the guest book, which has been preserved. There, from November 13 to 16, 1917, he met Hélène Johanna Rosina "Puppie" van de Velde (1899–1935), the daughter of the Weimar-based Belgian architect and designer Henry van de Velde. About ten years earlier, she had been his classmate at the ‘’Freie Schulgemeinde Wickersdorf‘’. When he then met Karin (1898–1920) at the castle, the daughter of the art historian and entrepreneur Eberhard von Bodenhausen, who was considered mentally unstable in her own family, he was impressed by her and fell in love. Her father was the brother-in-law of the lady of the castle, Julie Freifrau von Wendelstadt (1871–1942), née Countess Degenfeld-Schonburg. In order to keep Karin close to his family, he tried to place her as a nurse in the Oskar-Helene-Heim in Dahlem near Berlin via his father. In December 1917, however, he had to realize that Karin von Bodenhausen had only been playing with him, and described this in a disillusioned two-stanza poem.

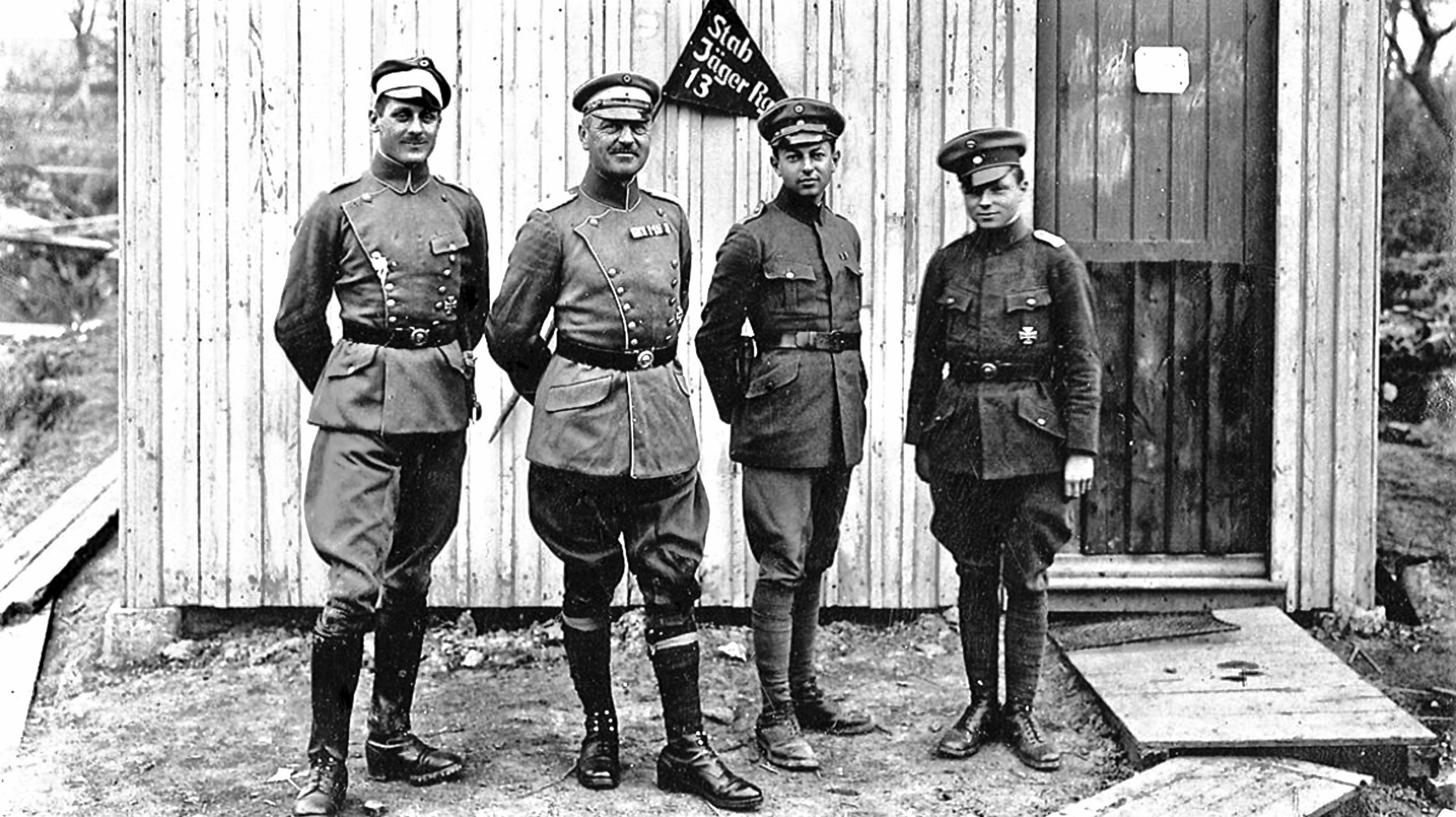
Otto Braun as a 20-year-old Leutnant and Orderly on the Somme; 3rd from left, April 1918

At the end of 1917, after a renewed declaration of his fitness for military service, which is hardly comprehensible from today's medical perspective given the severity of his injuries, he was deployed to the Western Front from February 1918, where, as a 20-year-old Leutnant and Ordonnanzoffizier together with five comrades from his 1st Reserve-Jäger-Battalion. Company of the Reserve Jaeger Battalion No. 21 fell in a dugout when it was hit by a grenade.

== Political views ==
Braun supported a form of revolutionary social democracy, with elements of German nationalism.

== Legacy ==
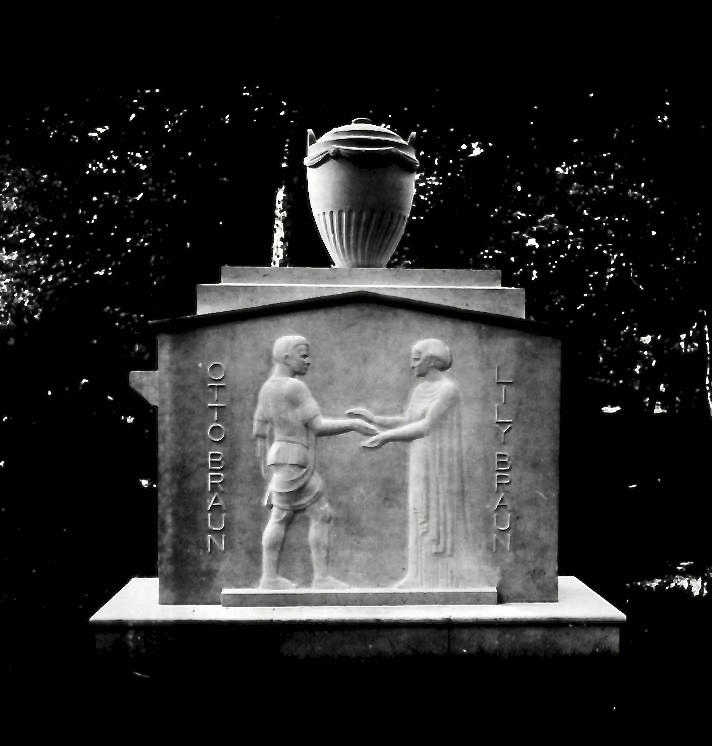
Tombstone of Otto and Lily Braun in Erlenweg in Kleinmachnow

Otto Braun was buried in the German military cemetery near Bayonvillers in the Somme department, but was later reburied. Since then, he has rested at the side of his mother Lily. The grave was placed on his family's former estate at Erlenweg 29 in Kleinmachnow near Berlin. As the formerly extensive plot of land has since been parcelled out, the grave and grave monument are now located on the neighboring property at Klausener Straße 22 of the preserved and now restored Braun villa.

Otto Braun's former mathematics teacher Kaempf dedicated an obituary to him: "Even in his earliest youth, Otto Braun attracted the attention of wide circles through his rare talent and astonishingly versatile mind. The fresh naturalness and youthful cheerfulness of his disposition led one to expect the emergence of an intellectually highly developed and harmonious personality. The boy Goethe should probably be thought of like him."

After Braun's death became known, the Austrian writer Hugo von Hofmannsthal wrote: "Berlin, 11. V. 18. As I was closing the letter, a telephone call came from Rudolf Borchardt: the young Braun has died. It is horrible, these sacrifices of the highest blossoms of our intellectual life, horrible, horrible, I am completely overwhelmed by the death of this man, to whom one has so much connection without knowing him and who wrote such fabulous, fabulous letters. Horrible, horrible..."

Under the title Aus nachgelassenen Schriften eines Frühvollendeten, the later fourth wife of his father, Julie Braun-Vogelstein, published Otto Braun's diary notes, letters, poems and scenes from a play after the end of the war, which were also published in English in London and New York City. In 1969, Braun-Vogelstein also published the book Fragment of the Future. Aufzeichnungen eines Frühvollendeten with further diary entries and letters.

== Bibliography ==
- Poems
- Eros and Psyche (five scenes of an unfinished play)
- Sigurd vom Walde (unpublished fragment of a novel)
