= Edgar Jaffé =

German economist and politician (1866–1921)

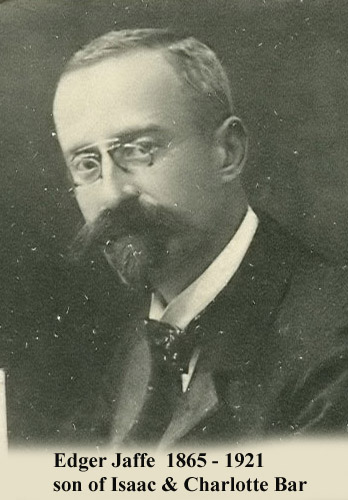
- Jaffé in 1902

Minister of Finance
- In office 21 November 1918 – 17 March 1919
- Prime Minister: Kurt Eisner

Personal details
- Born: 14 May 1866 Hamburg, North German Confederation
- Died: 29 April 1921 (aged 54) Ebenhausen, Weimar Republic
- Party: USPD
- Spouse: Else von Richthofen (m. 1902)
- Children: 3

Edgar Jaffé (14 May 1866 – 29 April 1921) was a German economist and politician.

Born in Hamburg to a Jewish commercial family in 1866, Jaffé worked in his family business in Barcelona and Paris. He then moved to Manchester and worked at his family's textile mill. He became wealthy and eventually moved to Heidelberg in 1900 to become an academic. During that time, he met Else von Richthofen, who he married two years later. At this time, he became a professor at Heidelberg University. In 1903, he bought and renamed the Archiv für Sozialwissenschaft und Sozialpolitik, which he coedited with Max Weber and Werner Sombart. Over the course of the next decade, his marriage fell apart due to a series of affairs that his wife was having, including with Otto Gross and Max and Alfred Weber. He moved to Munich and worked at a local university after they separated.

After the First World War began in 1914, he supported the German occupation of Belgium by serving as a banker in the occupied country. Originally interpreting the war as an ideological battle between Prussian authority and democracy, he became a socialist after it became apparent that Germany would lose the war in 1918. Jaffé participated in mass rallies with Kurt Eisner, who appointed him the minister of finance for the People's State of Bavaria. Eisner's support for the idea of German war guilt resulted in him losing an election and being assassinated in 1919. Jaffé continued to serve in a caretaker role until he resigned on 17 March. After the rise and fall of the Bavarian Soviet Republic in April, he made an attempt to preserve his reputation by writing a philosophical text. However, he experienced a psychological breakdown in June. He was institutionalised in Ebenhausen and died in 1921.

== Life ==
On 14 May 1866, Edgar Jaffé was born in Hamburg. He was born to Isaac Joseph Jaffé and Charlotte Rosa Beer. Isaac descended from an assimilationist branch of a prominent Jewish family that had become involved with commerce, the Jaffe family. There were also several rabbis among his ancestors, including Mordecai Yoffe, the author of the ten-volume Levush Malkhus. Edgar Jaffé was religiously Protestant and was baptized on 26 March 1882. After being awarded his Mittlere Reife, a certificate for completing ten years of schooling, Edgar Jaffé completed a single year of mandatory military service and continued his training in commerce. During this time, he spent time in Paris and Barcelona, before working for eight years in his family's textile mill in Manchester with his brother, Siegfried. He was increasingly unhappy with commerce during his time in Manchester. The two brothers left the business in 1898 and decided to invest in real estate. While Jaffé's payout was smaller than his brother's, he still earned enough to obtain a villa in Grunewald. However, he did not live in it. He moved to Heidelberg in 1900. Jaffé decided to pursue his interests in studying economics after moving. Since he had not completed his Abitur, he required sponsors to further his academic career. He obtained these sponsorships from Gustav von Schmoller and Max Sering. Shortly thereafter, he wrote a paper, "Die englische Baumwollindustrie und die Organisation des Exporthandels", for Schmoller's journal.

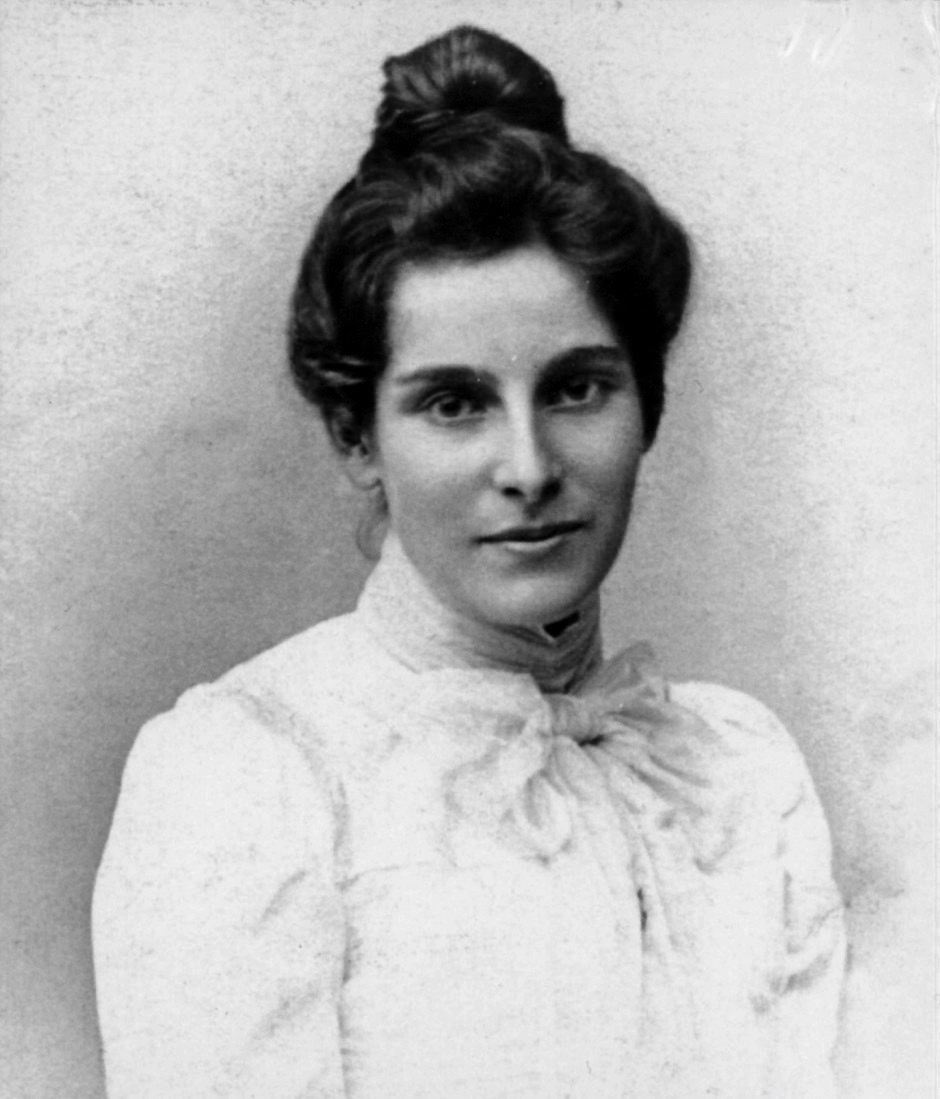
Else von Richthofen in 1902

While in Heidelberg, Jaffé met Else von Richthofen. In 1902, he proposed marriage, but she rejected him. Max Weber, her doctoral advisor, told her that Jaffé had an opportunity to become habilitated and might leave for Australia. They met and discussed the topic of his future, which quickly resulted in an engagement in May. They were married on 19 November. During this time, Jaffé was also trying to advance himself academically. Over the course of the next two years, he wrote on the subject of philosophy, which culminated in him giving an address at Heidelberg University. He intended to publish the essay in the Archiv für soziale Gesetzgebung und Statistik, but was talked out of it by Weber, who noticed that it was derivative of one of his own writings. Jaffé had bought the Archiv from Heinrich Braun for 60,000 German marks in 1903. Retitled the Archiv für Sozialwissenschaft und Sozialpolitik, it was edited by Jaffé, alongside Weber and Werner Sombart. On 28 September 1903, his first child, Friedel, was born. Another child, Marianne, followed two years later. However, Else was experiencing postpartum depression in 1904, resulting in her being institutionalised for multiple weeks in Baden-Baden, before spending over a month with her parents. The latter caused their marriage to deteriorate. While Weber had tried to get her to translate W. E. B. Du Bois's The Souls of Black Folk into German in 1905, her second pregnancy prevented it.

During the early twentieth century, professors at Heidelberg competed with one another to build villas to flaunt their wealth. Jaffé chose to have his built above a locally prominent ruin, Unter der Schanz. While this was happening, Else was having the first in a series of affairs. She had an affair with Friedrich Völcker, a university surgeon who was treating her. It was a largely physical relationship. After that had started, she started a simultaneous intellectual and sexual affair with Otto Gross. She met him through her friendship with his wife, Frieda Schloffer. She had a child by him, Peter, on 27 December 1907. The Jaffés' marriage stabilised in 1909 with the end of the affair with Völcker and their final child, Hans, was born on 25 February. However, Max and Marianne Weber visited the Jaffés in September, where it became apparent that Max was sexually attracted to Else. Later scholars have suggested that a sexual encounter occurred when Weber and the Jaffés went to Venice without Marianne, but that was later disproven. After Weber failed to start a relationship with Else, she turned to his brother, Alfred. In 1910, the Jaffés' marriage decayed to the point where Else refused to live in the same house as Edgar. He responded by trying to take away their children, which resulted in an emotionally charged legal battle that involved her mother and the Webers. Due to the growing dispute between Max and Alfred Weber over her, she split with Max. The Jaffés permanently separated at this time. They moved to Munich, where Edgar had accepted a professorship at a local business school, and lived in separate homes. Alfred and Edgar would alternate their visits based on Else's schedule, which would occasionally result in accidental overlaps.

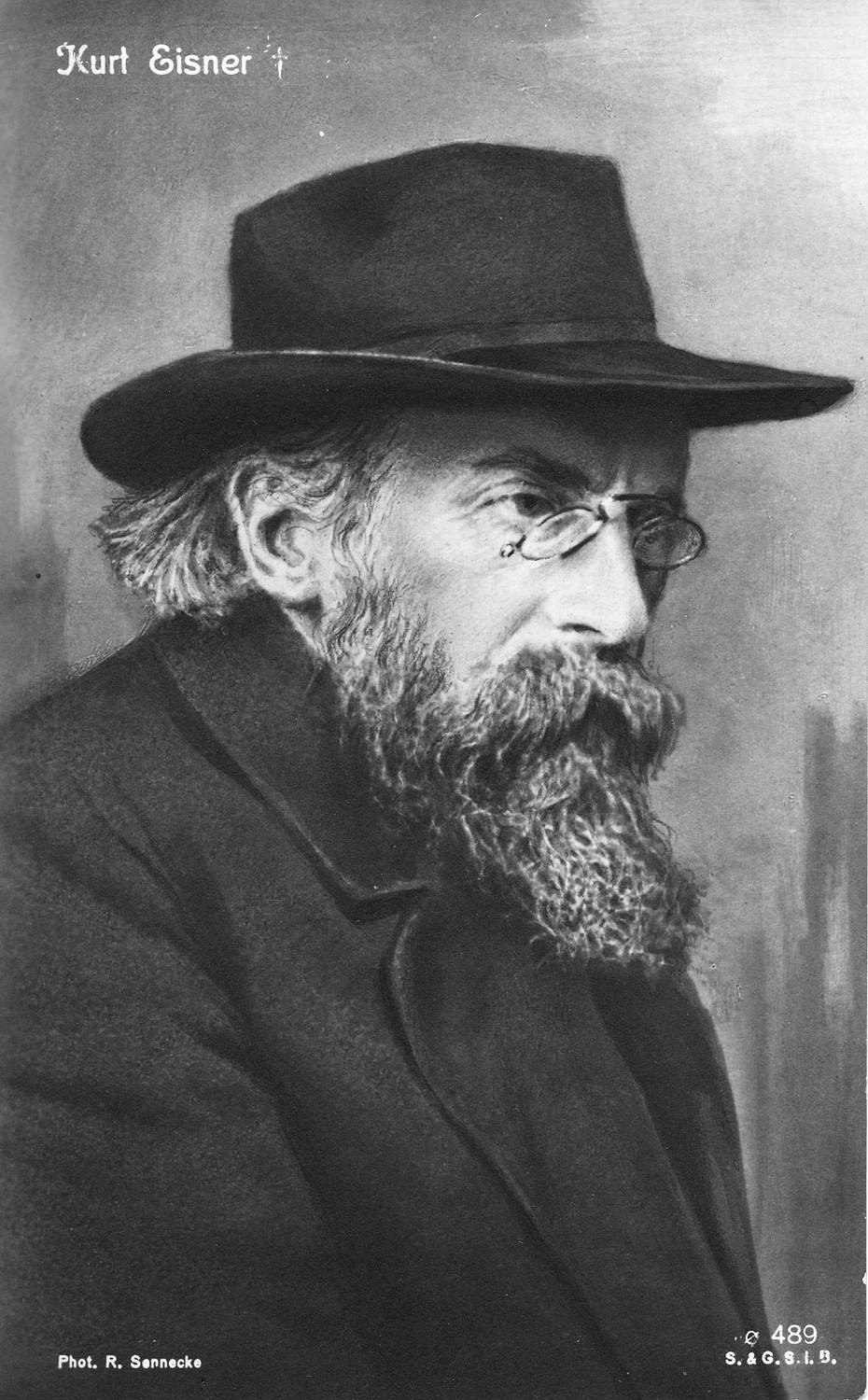
Kurt Eisner, the leader of the People's State of Bavaria

In response to the beginning of the First Balkan War in 1913, Edgar Jaffé travelled to Greece and the Ottoman Empire with a colleague to observe the war. A year later, the First World War began, which resulted in the military involvement of both Jaffé and Alfred in the war effort. In 1915, Jaffé served as a banker in Brussels during the occupation of Belgium. He was assigned the task of making Belgium economically dependent on the German Empire. He tried to get Max Weber to participate, but he declined after a brief trip to Belgium. The death of Peter on 15 October 1915 caused Jaffé to return home. He was convinced that Germany would win the war and that the conflict represented an ideological battle between Prussian authority and democracy. As he became convinced that the war was militarily unwinnable in 1917, he began to think that diplomatic means were preferable. After the failure of the German spring offensive in 1918, he radicalised and joined the Independent Social Democratic Party of Germany. He joined Kurt Eisner at mass rallies in Munich and participated in the overthrow of the Bavarian monarchy, replacing it with the People's State of Bavaria. On 8 November, Eisner issued a provisional list of his cabinet members. Jaffé was made minister of finance, which Eisner described as the "most thankless" position. He supported Gemeinschaft as a separate path from communism and capitalism. However, Eisner tried to lessen the consequences for Germany by supporting the idea that it was guilty for the war. This angered the majority of the German population, which led to his downfall. After the Independent Socialists lost the election on 12 January 1919 and Eisner's assassination on 21 February, Jaffé continued to serve in a caretaker role. He resigned on 17 March. He continued to be politically active until the Bavarian Soviet Republic was declared in 13 April, which was then crushed by right-wing forces within a month.

While this was going on, Max Weber had resumed his relationship with Else. He wished to be given a professorship at the Ludwig-Maximilians-Universität München to be closer to her. He obtained the appointment. Edgar Jaffé had initially won the approval of his wife and colleagues for his actions, but he rapidly lost it due to political disagreements and his own political downfall. After losing power, he briefly tried to restore his reputation by writing a philosophical treatise, but he experienced a psychological collapse in the middle of June 1919. He was taken to the Neufriedenheim sanatorium in Ebenhausen, near Munich. Weber intervened to give Else advice regarding the financial difficulties that the Jaffés were facing. He visited Edgar and thought that the cause of his illness was low self-esteem. Weber died unexpectedly on 14 June 1920. Edgar Jaffé died on 29 April 1921. D. H. Lawrence, who had married Else's sister Frieda, wrote to Else and said that he was glad that Edgar had died. Marianne Weber wrote to an acquaintance of hers that the "wretched shadow of a man" did not have any way out other than by dying. A continuation of his existence would have been too costly, in her view. Else wrote a positive obituary, which served to counter the negative popular perception of Edgar. During the 1920s and 1930s Alfred and Else resumed their relationship. His children immigrated to the United States in response to Nazi Germany's antisemitism.

== General and cited sources ==
- Demm, Eberhard (January 2017). "Max and Alfred Weber and Their Female Entourage". Max Weber Studies. 17 (1): 64–91. doi:10.1353/max.2017.a808647. ISSN 1470-8078. JSTOR 10.15543/maxweberstudies.17.1.64. S2CID 171435083. Project MUSE 808647.
- Jaeger, Hans (1974). "Jaffé, Edgar". Neue Deutsche Biographie (in German). Vol. 10. Berlin: Duncker & Humblot. pp. 290–291. ISBN 9783428001811. OCLC 310770467.
- Lilla, Joachim. "Jaffé, Edgar". Staatsminister, leitende Verwaltungsbeamte und (NS-)Funktionsträger in Bayern 1918 bis 1945 (in German). OCLC 856871907.
- Menges, Franz (2012). "Edgar Jaffé (1866–1921), Nationalökonom und Finanzminister im Kabinett Kurt Eisner". In Haus der Bayerischen Geschichte; Grimm, Claus; Treml, Manfred; Weigand, Wolf (eds.). Lebensläufe. Geschichte und Kultur der Juden in Bayern (in German). Vol. 18 (Reprint ed.). De Gruyter. pp. 225–230. doi:10.1515/9783111548579.225. ISBN 9783111548579. OCLC 907080894.
- Roth, Guenther (July 2010). "Edgar Jaffé and Else von Richthofen in the Mirror of Newly Found Letters". Max Weber Studies. 10 (2): 151–188. doi:10.1353/max.2010.a808805. ISSN 1470-8078. JSTOR 24579567. S2CID 178085610. Project MUSE 808805.
