= Katta Sterna =

German actress and dancer (1897–1984)

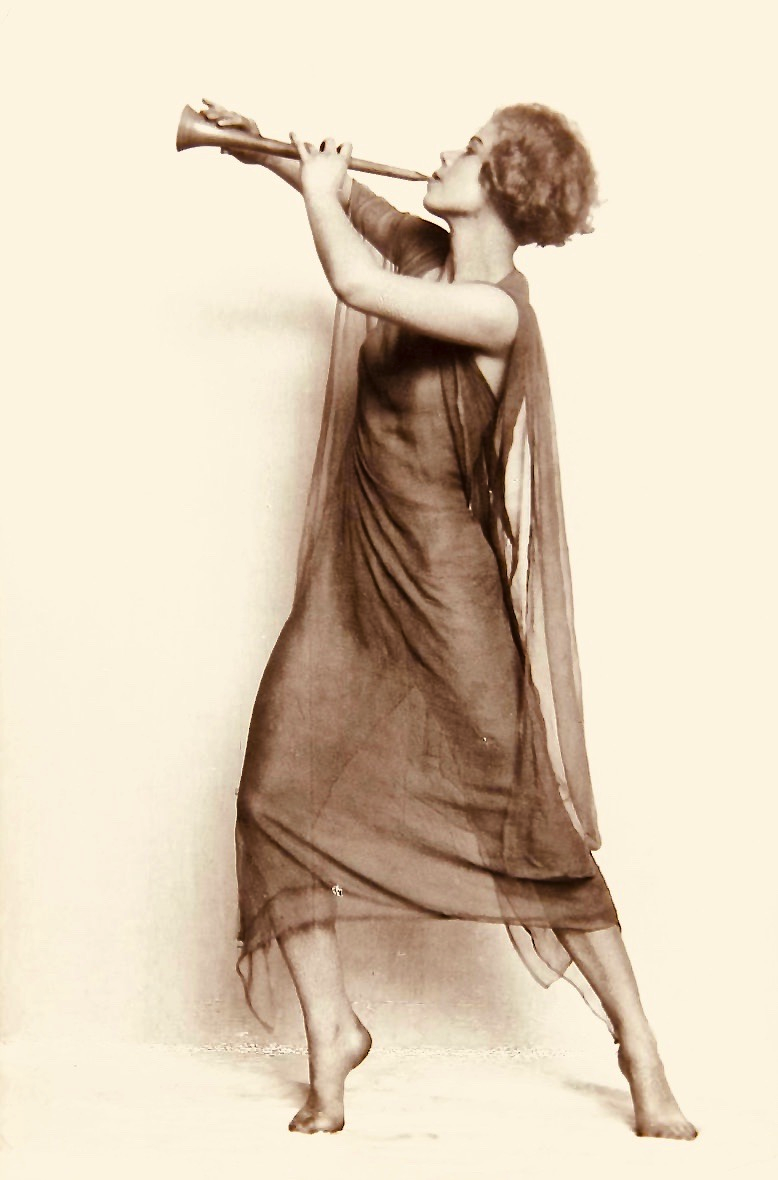
- Katta Sterna, around 1918
- Born: Katharina Ida Stern; December 19, 1897; Berlin, German Empire
- Died: July 29, 1984 (aged 86); Berlin, West Germany
- Occupations: Actress, dancer
- Parent(s): Georg Joseph Stern; Bertha Elisabeth Schmidt
- Relatives: Johanna Hofer (sister); Maria Matray (sister); Regula Keller (sister)

Katta Sterna (born Katharina Ida Stern; December 19, 1897 – July 29, 1984) was a German actress and dancer.

== Biography ==
Katharina Stern was the daughter of engineer Georg Joseph Stern and his wife Bertha Elisabeth (1870–1963), née Schmidt, the younger sister of Conrad Schmidt and Käthe Kollwitz, née Schmidt. Katharina's sisters were actress Johanna Therese (married to director Fritz Kortner), actress and choreographer Maria Matray, and stage actress Gregola Keller (known under stage name Regula Keller, 1897–1983).

During her adolescence, Katharina was considered distracted and very impulsive. Her parents therefore consulted Theodor Ziehen, head of the Psychiatric and Neurological Clinic at the Charité of the Friedrich-Wilhelms-University Berlin, who diagnosed her as incurable and recommended her placement in a sanatorium.

== Career ==
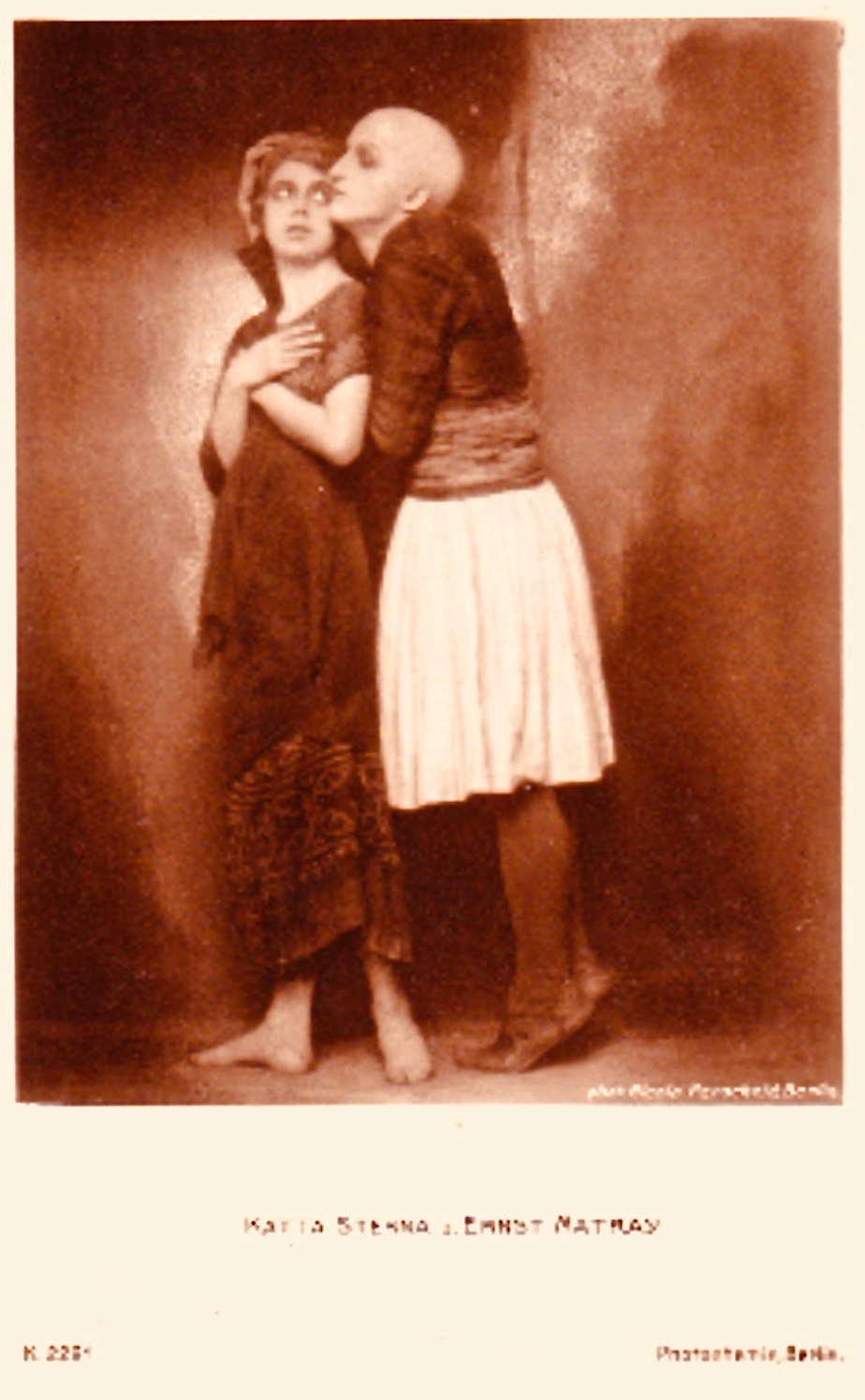
Katta Stern and Ernst Mátray, circa 1925

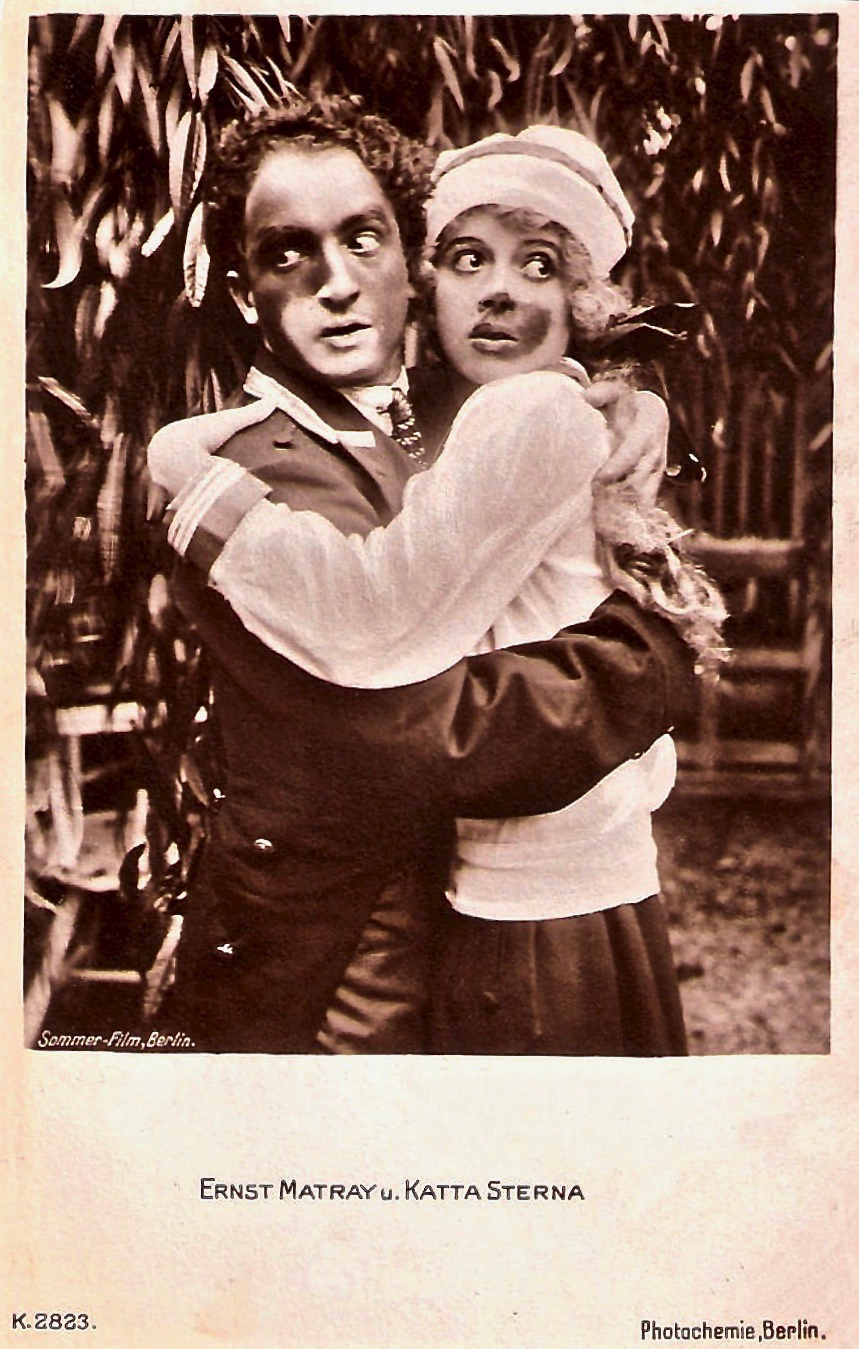
Ernst Mátray and Katta Stern, circa 1929

When Katharina saw dancer Anna Pavlova dance, she decided to become a dancer as well. She took lessons from Austrian dancer, choreographer, dance educator, and actress Grete Wiesenthal. Her first engagements were at the German Opera House in Berlin, where she adopted the stage name "Katta Sterna." In 1913, she met actor and dancer Ernst Mátray, who was married to actress Greta Schröder. They became a couple both professionally and privately.

In 1915, Katta Sterna made her theater debut with Max Reinhardt alongside Ernst Mátray in Midsummer Night's Dream. From that point on, they had many joint performances as a dance duo. She also performed as a solo dancer with the Mátray Ballet. Contemporary literature described her dance style as a new form of pantomime.

From 1914, she appeared in silent films, initially in Lumpchens Glück. Her only sound film was Tingel-Tangel, produced by Erich Engels in 1930. Around 1917, Zehlendorf poet Otto Braun unilaterally fell in love her, but Rudolf Borchardt finally managed to dissuade Braun from this unpromising love affair during a heated conversation, because Sterna was in a relationship with Ernst Matray.

Alongside her film career, Katta Sterna became an innovative dancer. In the 1920s, projects emerged in collaboration with Ernst Mátray and her sister Maria Solveg, including The Green Flute, Before the Mirror, and Midsummer Night's Dream.

After the transfer of power to the National Socialists, the artist, classified as fully Jewish, was no longer allowed to perform in the German Reich. She toured England and the United States, but her attempt to emigrate failed. Therefore, she had to withdraw from public life in Germany.

Her estate is preserved at the German Dance Archive in Cologne.

== Filmography ==
- 1914: Lumpchens Glück
- 1914: Das Sportsmädel
- 1915: The Bartered Bride
- 1915: Marionettes
- 1915: Teufelchen
- 1918: Ticky-Tacky
- 1919: A Brilliant Case
- 1919: The Engagement Telescope
- 1920: Flimmerherzen
- 1920: O du Quetschfalte meines Herzens
- 1921: Comrades
- 1921: When I Was a Corpse
- 1929: Sailor's Dance. Maria Solveg and Katta Sterna of the Matray Ballet
- 1930: Tingel-Tangel

== Literature ==
- Paul Nikolaus, Ernst E. Stern: Dancers. Delphin-Verlag, Munich 1919, p. 43. OCLC 853284221
- John Schikowski: History of Dance. Büchergilde Gutenberg, Berlin 1926, p. 159. OCLC 914634787
- Victor Junk: Handbook of Dance. Ernst Klett Verlag, Stuttgart 1930, p. 225.
- Burcu Dogramaci: Drei Schwestern. The Actresses Maria Solveg, Katta Sterna, and Johanna Hofer between the Empire and Emigration. In: Exile, No. 1 (2003), pp. 62–77. (Part 1); Exile, No. 2 (2003), 2, pp. 5–19. (Part 2)
