= Else von Richthofen =

German social scientist (1874–1973)

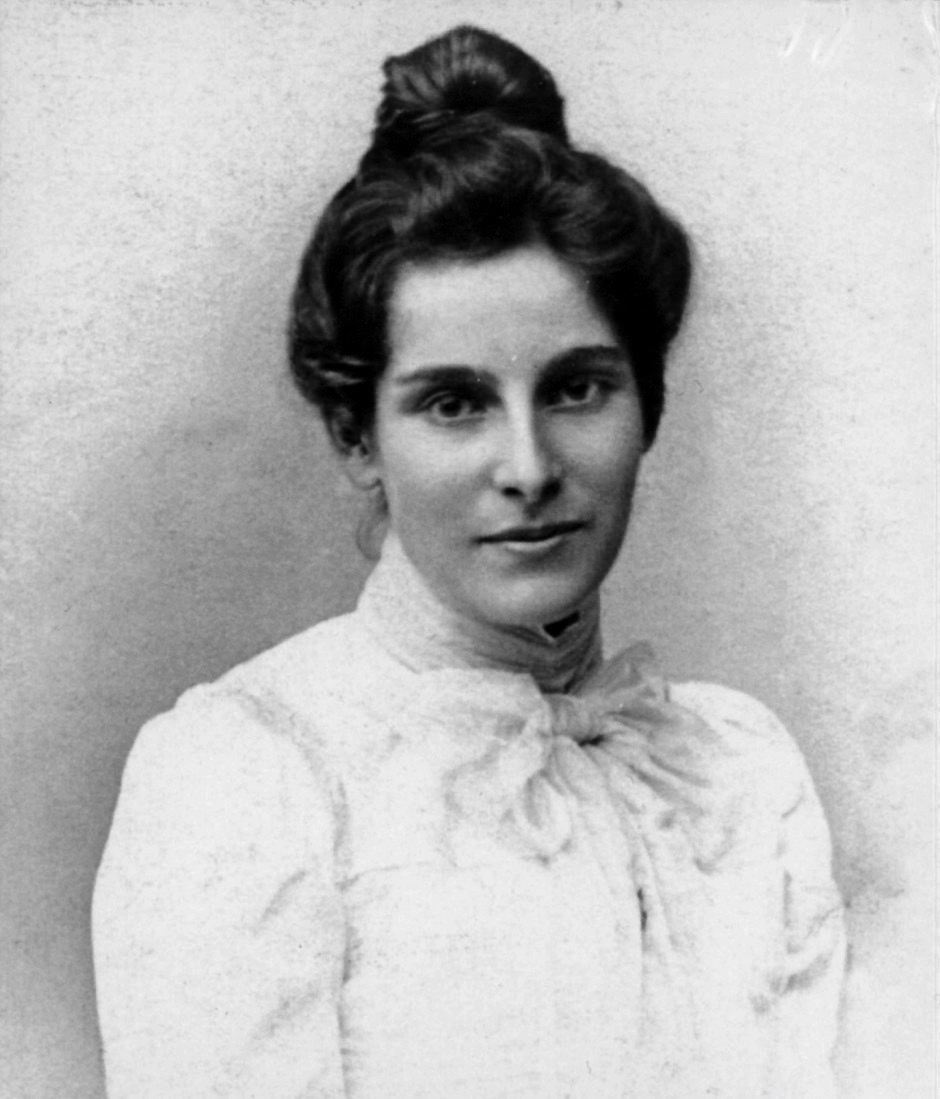
Elisabeth Freiin von Richthofen (1874–1973), distant relative of Red Baron Manfred von Richthofen, was one of the first female German social scientists.

Elisabeth Helene Amalie Sophie Freiin von Richthofen (October 8, 1874 – December 22, 1973), also known as Else Jaffé, was among the early female social scientists in Germany.

== Life and career ==
Elisabeth Freiin von Richthofen was born into the Heinersdorf line of the German Richthofen noble house at Château-Salins, France. She was the oldest of three daughters of Friedrich Ernst Emil Ludwig Freiherr von Richthofen (1844–1915), an engineer in the Imperial German Army, and Anna Elise Lydia Marquier (1852–1930). Her younger sister was the author and translator Frieda Lawrence.

Anna Marquier had attended a well-known boarding school in Freiburg, run by Julie and Camilla Blas. Else and her sisters went to the same school in 1889, 1896, and 1897 respectively. She left that school for training as a teacher in 1891. When she then started her professional career as a teacher, Else prepared for further education. Beginning in 1895, she took courses at the University of Freiburg as an auditor, where she met Marianne and Max Weber, beginning a lifelong friendship with the former. In 1897, Max Weber moved to Heidelberg University as an instructor and von Richtofen as his student. Permission from professors was then required for women to attend university classes in Germany. She enrolled at Heidelberg University at a time when this was still very unusual for women; she was one of just four female students at the time. She wrote a thesis, under the tutelage of Max Weber, on the shifting stances of German political parties towards legislation to protect workers. She then studied at the Friedrich Wilhelm University in Berlin from 1898 to 1900. She earned a doctorate in economics in 1901 under Max Weber and started to work as a labour inspector in Karlsruhe.

She had a great empathy for the poor material conditions of workers, but she found her work in Karlsruhe intellectually monotonous. In 1902, to the great astonishment of her feminist friends, she abandoned her career to marry Edgar Jaffé, a rich professor of political economy who, like her, was a former student of economist Max Weber. Edgar, then a recognized economist, bought the scientific journal Archiv für Sozialwissenschaft und Sozialpolitik, which had Max Weber as one of its editors.

It seems, according to Else von Richthofen's correspondence, that this was less a marriage of love than of a tender friendship. With Jaffé, she had three children, Friedel (born 1903), Marianne (born 1905) and Hans (born 1909). The couple separated in 1910 but never divorced. Edgar Jaffé died of pneumonia on 29 April 1921 in a sanatorium near Munich. Following her marriage, her name became Else Jaffé, but she used Else Jaffé von Richtofen during Nazi rule, when her association with the Jewish Jaffé family triggered antisemitic restrictions.

Else became acquainted with intellectuals and authors, including the sociologists and economists Max Weber and Alfred Weber, the psychoanalyst Otto Gross, the writer Fanny zu Reventlow and others. She started an affair with Otto Gross with whom she had a fourth child, Peter (1907 – c. 1915).

During World War I, she participated for some time in the National Women's Service (Nationalen Frauendienst) which supported the war effort until 1916, when she moved to near Munich.

Else von Jaffe had affairs with her former professor Max Weber and his brother Alfred Weber. Historian Eberhard Demm reports that Else and Max each fell in love with each other in 1909, but that the relationship was not consummated. Alfred initiated their affair in December 1909 and they exchanged passionate letters once it had begun. Edgar, who had previously tolerated his wife's affairs, objected and struggled with Else over custody of their children. Jealous of his brother, Max supported Edgar in this dispute. Under terms of their separation, Else remained at the villa Vogelnest, while her husband moved to a Munich apartment. Else and Max became lovers sometime after 1916 and engaged in a passionate and sometimes sadomasochistic love affair in the final years of his life. Max's wife Marianne and Else alternately cared for Max on his deathbed. Marianne Weber took up the publication of Max's final works, though reportedly with Else's assistance. The third volume, Gesammelte Aufsätze zur Religionssoziologie, is dedicated to Else.

After the deaths of Max Weber and of her husband, in 1920 and 1921 respectively, Else wound up living with Alfred Weber, becoming his reader, translator, and travel companion until his death in 1958, at the age of 90. Else and Alfred rented adjacent apartments at 24 Bachstraße and lived there until Weber’s death in 1958. Marianne Weber died in 1954 in Else's arms.

Else von Richthofen died on December 22, 1973, in Heidelberg.

The Center for Jewish History in New York City archives Else von Richthofen's correspondence as well as the letters of other member of her family, notably of her son Friedel (Frederick Jeffrey).
