= Otto Braun (disambiguation) =

Otto Braun (1872–1955) was a German politician and Prime Minister of Prussia.

Otto Braun may also refer to:

- Otto Braun (poet) (1897–1918), German poet
- Otto Braun (communist) (1900–1974), German communist journalist and Comintern agent
- Otto Philipp Braun (1798–1869), German-born Bolivian military officer and politician
- Otto Philipp Braun (journalist) (1824–1900), German editor and translator
