= Lily Braun =

German feminist writer (1865–1916)

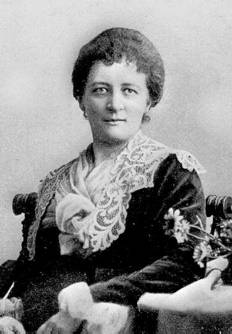
- From the Berliner Illustrierte Zeitung (1902)
- Born: Amalie von Kretschmann; 2 July 1865; Halberstadt, Saxony, Kingdom of Prussia
- Died: 8 August 1916 (aged 51); Zehlendorf, Brandenburg, German Empire
- Occupation: Feminist writer
- Spouse: Heinrich Braun

Lily Braun (2 July 1865 – 8 August 1916), born Amalie von Kretschmann, was a German feminist writer and politician of the Social Democratic Party (SPD). She developed the idea of the single-kitchen home.

== Life ==
She was born on 2 July 1865 in Halberstadt, in the Prussian province of Saxony, the daughter of Hans von Kretschmann, General of the Infantry in the Prussian Army, and his wife Jenny, née von Gustedt (1843–1903). Her maternal grandmother, the writer Jenny von Gustedt (1811–1890), was an illegitimate daughter of Jérôme Bonaparte, Napoleon Bonaparte's brother and King of Westphalia, and his mistress Diana Rabe von Pappenheim. Lily Braun's great-niece, Marianne von Kretschmann, married Richard von Weizsäcker, president of Germany from 1984 to 1994.

Raised according to the Prussian virtues of order and discipline from her father's military career, Braun nevertheless developed a direct and open personality, encouraged in particular by her grandmother Jenny von Gustedt. She was considered to be highly ambitious, and her family provided her with a broad education by numerous private teachers. From an early age, she began to question her parents' bourgeois values as influenced by Lutheranism and Calvinism as well the position of women in Prussian society. When her father retired in 1890, Braun had to establish a sustainable livelihood herself.

In 1893, Braun married to Georg von Gizycki, a professor of philosophy at the Frederick William University in Berlin, who was associated with the Social Democratic Party without however being a member. Together with him she was involved in the ethical movement, which sought to establish a system of morality in place of the traditional religions. Also, she became concerned with the ideas of socialism and the feminist movement, working as a journalist for the feminist newspaper Die Frauenbewegung (The Women's Movement) issued by Minna Cauer.

After her first husband's death, she married in 1896 Heinrich Braun, who was a Social Democratic politician and a publicist. The couple had one son, Otto Braun, a talented poet who was killed at the Western Front in the last months of World War I.

Braun joined the SPD at an early age and became one of the leaders of the German feminist movement. Within the party, she belonged to the revisionist opposition within the SPD, which did not believe in the theories of historical materialism, but aimed for a gradual change in society, rather than a socialist revolution. Her attempts to mediate between proletarian and bourgeois feminist circles and proposals on reconciliation of family and working life were highly criticized. Her answers to the woman question were rejected by socialist authors like Clara Zetkin, while middle-class circles considered her ideas too radical.

Like her fellow political activist Helene Stöcker, Braun was strongly influenced by Friedrich Nietzsche; she and her husband wanted the SPD to focus on the development of personality and individuality. They believed women should have their own personality and should not have to be regarded only as (future) mothers and wives. Braun wanted economic freedom for women and advocated new types of personal relations up to the abolition of legal marriage.

Deeply concerned about the fate of her son, Braun died in Zehlendorf (today part of Berlin) from the consequences of a stroke at the age of 51, in the midst of World War I. After her death, her second husband Heinrich Braun married Julie Braun-Vogelstein, who was also the editor of Lily Braun's Collected Works.

== Works ==
- Die Frauenfrage: Ihre geschichtliche Entwicklung und ihre wirtschaftliche Seite (The Women's Question: historical development and economic aspect) (1901)
- Wahrheit oder Legende: Ein Wort zu den Kriegsbriefen des Generals von Kretschman (Truth or Legend: A word on the war letters of General von Kretschmar)
- Die Mutterschaftsversicherung: Ein Beitrag zur Frage der Fürsorge für Schwangere und Wöchnerinnen (Maternity Insurance: an article on the question of care for pregnant women and those in childbed)
- Die Frauen und die Politik (Women and politics)
- Memoiren einer Sozialistin - Lehrjahre (Memoirs of a Woman Socialist - Apprenticeship years) (Novel)
- Memoiren einer Sozialistin - Kampfjahre (Memoirs of a Woman Socialist – Years of struggle) (Novel)
- Mutterschaft: Ein Sammelwerk für die Probleme des Weibes als Mutter (Motherhood: A collection of works on the problems of women as mothers)
- Die Liebesbriefe der Marquise (The Marchioness's Loveletters)
- Die Frauen und der Krieg (Women and the War)
- Im Schatten der Titanen: Erinnerungen an Baronin Jenny von Gustedt (In the Shadow of the Titans: Recollections of Baroness Jenny von Gustedt) (1908) - a biography of Braun's grandmother; the "Titans" of the title were Napoleon Bonaparte, who was von Gustedt's uncle, and Goethe, with whom she came in contact in her Weimar childhood.
- Lebenssucher (Searchers for Life)
- Frauenarbeit und Beruf (Women's Work and Career)
