= Archiv für Sozialwissenschaft und Sozialpolitik =

- Discipline: Sociology
- Language: German

Publication details
- History: 1888–1933

Standard abbreviations
- ISO 4: Arch. Sozialwiss. Sozialpolit.

Indexing
- ISSN: 0174-819X

The Archiv für Sozialwissenschaft und Sozialpolitik (ISSN 0174-819X, English: Archives for Social Science and Social Welfare) was an academic journal for the social sciences in Germany between 1888 and 1933. Its first editors were Edgar Jaffé, Werner Sombart, and Max Weber. The latter published his seminal essay The Protestant Ethic and the Spirit of Capitalism in the journal in two parts in 1904 and 1905.

Jaffé bought the journal in 1903 for 60000 Mark from the Social Democrat Heinrich Braun, who had founded and edited the journal under the title Archiv für soziale Gesetzgebung und Statistik (Archive for Social Legislation and Statistics) since 1888 and changed its title to Archiv für Sozialwissenschaft und Sozialpolitik in 1904.

In 1933, when the Nazis gained power in Germany, the last editor of the Archive, then-editor Emil Lederer and half of the editorial staff of the journal were forced to emigrate and the journal ceased to exist.

== Essays published in the Archiv ==
- Walter Benjamin, "Critique of Violence" ("Zur Kritik der Gewalt") Archiv für Sozialwissenschaften 47, no. 1 (1921), pp. 804–832
- Carl Schmitt, "The Crisis of Parliamentary Democracy" ("Der Begriff der modernen Demokratie in seinem Verhältnis zum Staatsbegriff.") Archiv für Sozialwissenschaften 47, no. 51 (1924), pp. 817–825
- Max Weber, "The Protestant Ethic and the Spirit of Capitalism" ("Die protestantische Ethik und der Geist des Kapitalismus"), Archiv für Sozialwissenschaften 20, no. 1 (1904), pp. 1–54; 21, no. 1 (1905), pp. 1–110.
- Ludwig von Mises, "Economic Calculation in the Socialist Commonwealth" ("Die Wirtschaftsrechnung im sozialistischen Gemeinwesen"), Archiv für Sozialwissenschaften 47, no. 1 (1920), pp. 86–121.
