= Werner Sombart =

German economist and historian (1863–1941)

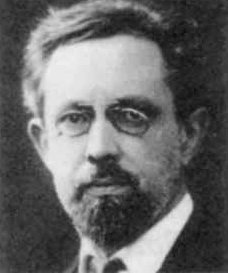
- Born: 19 January 1863; Ermsleben, Kingdom of Prussia
- Died: 18 May 1941 (aged 78); Berlin, Nazi Germany
- Education: University of Pisa; Sapienza University of Rome; Friedrich Wilhelm University (PhD, 1888)
- Known for: Coining the terms "late capitalism" and "creative destruction"
- Scientific career
- Fields: Economics, sociology, history
- Workplaces: University of Breslau; Handelshochschule Berlin; Friedrich Wilhelm University
- Doctoral advisor: Gustav von Schmoller; Adolph Wagner
- Doctoral students: Wassily Leontief; Richard Löwenthal

Werner Sombart (/ˈvɜːrnər ˈzɒmbɑːrt/; German: [ˈzɔmbaʁt]; 19 January 1863 – 18 May 1941) was a German economist, historian and sociologist. Head of the "Youngest Historical School," he was one of the leading Continental European social scientists during the first quarter of the 20th century. The term "late capitalism" is accredited to him. The concept of "creative destruction" associated with capitalism is also of his coinage.

His magnum opus was Der moderne Kapitalismus. It was published in three volumes from 1902 through 1927. In Kapitalismus he described four stages in the development of capitalism from its earliest iteration as it evolved out of feudalism, which he called proto-capitalism to early, high and, finally, late capitalism – Spätkapitalismus – in the post World War I period.

== Life and work ==
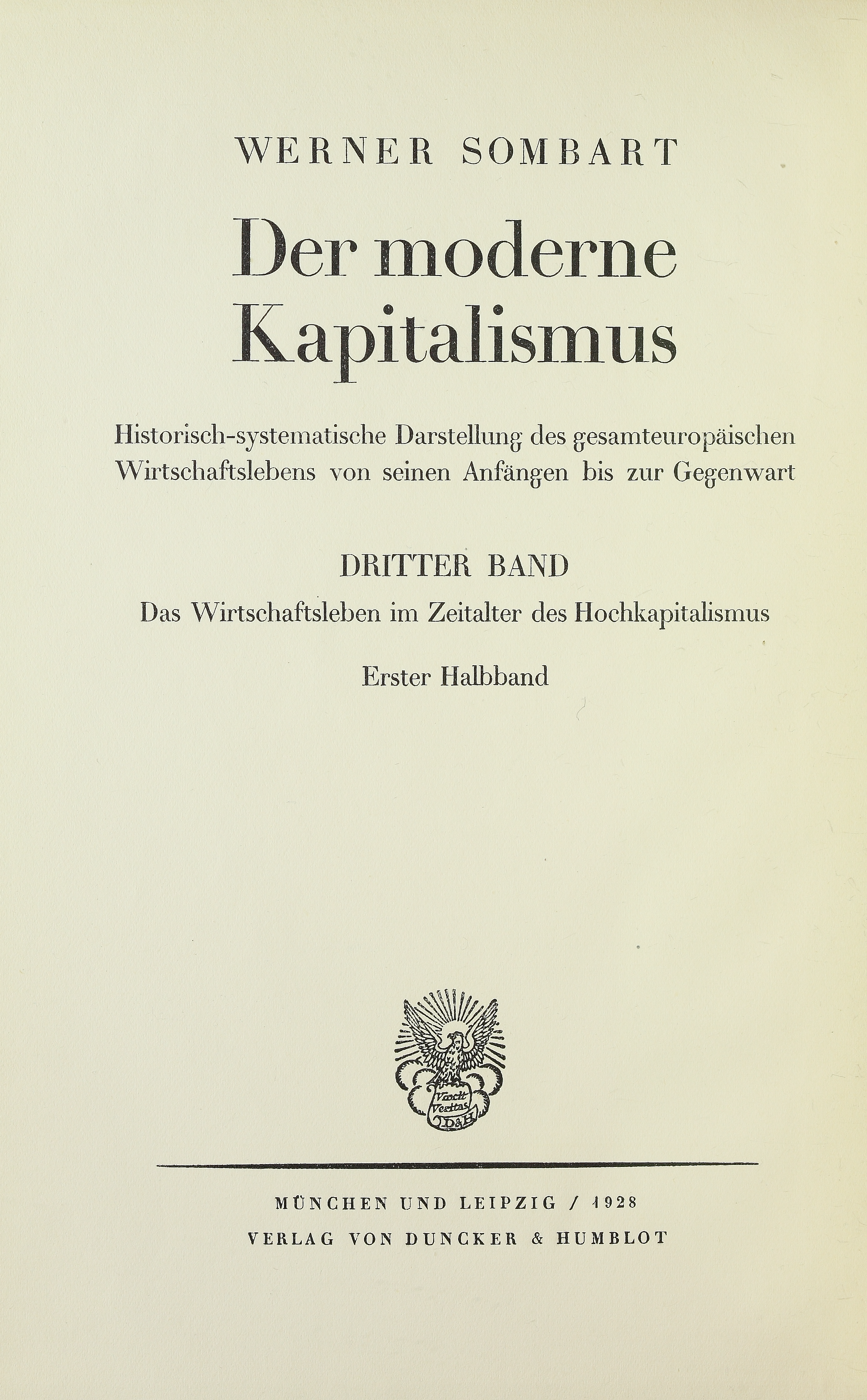
Wirtschaftsleben im Zeitalter des Hochkapitalismus, 1928

=== Early career, socialism and economics ===
Werner Sombart was born in Ermsleben, Harz, the son of a wealthy liberal politician, industrialist, and estate-owner, Anton Ludwig Sombart. He studied law and economics at the universities of Pisa, Berlin, and Rome. In 1888, he received his Ph.D. from Berlin under the direction of Gustav von Schmoller and Adolph Wagner, then the most eminent German economists.

As an economist and especially as a social activist, Sombart was then seen as radically left-wing, and so only received – after some practical work as head lawyer of the Bremen Chamber of Commerce – a junior professorship at the out-of-the-way University of Breslau. Although faculties at such eminent universities as Heidelberg University and the University of Freiburg called him to chairs, the respective governments always vetoed this. Sombart, at that time, was an important Marxian, someone who used and interpreted Karl Marx – to the point that Friedrich Engels said he was the only German professor who understood Das Kapital. Sombart called himself a "convinced Marxist," but later wrote that "It had to be admitted in the end that Marx had made mistakes on many points of importance."

As one of the German academics concerned with contemporary social policy, Sombart also joined the Verein für Socialpolitik (Social Policy Association) around 1888, together with his friend and colleague Max Weber. This was a then-new professional association of German historical school economists, who saw the role of economics primarily as finding solutions to the age's social problems and who pioneered large-scale statistical studies of economic issues.

Sombart was not the first sociologist to devote an entire book to the concept of social movement, as he did in his Sozialismus und soziale Bewegung, published in 1896. His understanding of social movements was inspired by Marx and by a book on social movements by Lorenz von Stein. For him, the rising workers' movement was a result of the inherent contradictions of capitalism. The proletarian situation created a "love for the masses", which, together with the tendency "to a communistic way of life" in social production, was a prime feature of the social movement.

Sombart's magnum opus, Der moderne Kapitalismus (Historisch-systematische Darstellung des gesamteuropäischen Wirtschaftslebens von seinen Anfängen bis zur Gegenwart) is a systematic history of economics and economic development through the centuries and very much a work of the Historical School. The development of capitalism is divided into three stages. The first volume of Der moderne Kapitalismus published in 1902, deals with proto-capitalism, the origins and transition to capitalism from feudalism, and the period he called early capitalism – Frühkapitalismus – which ended before the Industrial Revolution. In his second volume, which he published in 1916, he described the period that began c. 1760, as high capitalism – Hochkapitalismus. The last book, published in 1927, treats conditions in the 20th century. He called this stage late capitalism – Spätkapitalismus, which began with World War I. The three volumes were split into semi-volumes which totaled six books.

Although later much disparaged by neo-classical economists, and much criticized in specific points, Der moderne Kapitalismus is still today a standard work with important ramifications for, e.g., the Annales school (Fernand Braudel). His work was criticised by Rosa Luxemburg, who attributed to it "the express intention of driving a wedge between the trade unions and the social democracy in Germany, and of enticing the trade unions over to the bourgeois position."

In 1903, Sombart accepted a position as associate editor of the Archiv für Sozialwissenschaft und Sozialpolitik, where he worked with his colleagues Max Weber and Edgar Jaffé.

In 1906, Sombart accepted a call to a full professorship at the Berlin School of Commerce, an inferior institution to the University of Breslau but closer to political "action" than Breslau. Here, inter alia, companion volumes to Modern Capitalism dealing with luxury, fashion, and war as economic paradigms appeared; the former two were the key works on the subject until now. Also in 1906 his Why is there no Socialism in the United States? appeared. The book is a famous work on American exceptionalism in this respect to this day.

Sombart's 1911 book, Die Juden und das Wirtschaftsleben (The Jews and Modern Capitalism), is an addition to Max Weber's historic study of the connection between Protestantism (especially Calvinism) and capitalism, with Sombart documenting Jewish involvement in historic capitalist development. He argued that Jewish traders and manufacturers, excluded from the guilds, developed a distinctive antipathy to the fundamentals of medieval commerce, which they saw as primitive and unprogressive: the desire for 'just' (and fixed) wages and prices; for an equitable system in which shares of the market were agreed and unchanging; profits and livelihoods modest but guaranteed; and limits placed on production. Excluded from the system, Sombart argued, the Jews broke it up and replaced it with modern capitalism, in which competition was unlimited and the only law was pleasing the customer. Paul Johnson, who considers the work "a remarkable book", notes that Sombart left out some inconvenient truths, and ignored the powerful mystical elements of Judaism. Sombart refused to recognize, as Weber did, "that wherever these religious systems, including Judaism, were at their most powerful and authoritarian, commerce did not flourish. Jewish businessmen, like Calvinist ones, tended to operate most successfully when they had left their traditional religious environment and had moved to fresh pastures".

In his somewhat eclectic 1913 book Der Bourgeois (translated as The quintessence of capitalism), Sombart endeavoured to provide a psychological and sociological portrait of the modern businessman, and to explain the origins of the capitalist spirit. The book begins with "the greed for gold", the roots of private enterprise, and the types of entrepreneurs. Subsequent chapters discuss "the middle class outlook" and various factors shaping the capitalist spirit – national psychology, racial factors, biological factors, religion, migrations, technology, and "the influence of capitalism itself."

In a work published in 1915, a "war book" with the title Händler und Helden Sombart welcomed the "German War" as the "inevitable conflict between the English commercial civilisation and the heroic culture of Germany". In this book, according to Friedrich Hayek, Sombart revealed an unlimited contempt for the "commercial views of the English people" who had lost all warlike instincts, as well as contempt for "the universal striving for the happiness of the individual". To Sombart, in this work, the highest ideal is the "German idea of the State. As formulated by Fichte, Ferdinand Lassalle, and Johann Karl Rodbertus, the state is neither founded nor formed by individuals, nor an aggregate of individuals, nor is its purpose to serve any interests of individuals. It is a 'Volksgemeinschaft' (people's community) in which the individual has no rights but only duties. Claims of the individual are always an outcome of the commercial spirit. The 'ideas of 1789' – Liberty, Equality, and Fraternity – are characteristically commercial ideals which have no other purpose but to secure certain advantages to individuals." Sombart further claims that the war had helped the Germans to rediscover their "glorious heroic past as a warrior people"; that all economic activities are subordinated to military ends; and that to regard war as inhuman and senseless is a product of commercial views. There is a life higher than the individual life, the life of the people and the life of the state, and it is the purpose of the individual to sacrifice himself for that higher life. War against England was therefore also a war against the opposite ideal – the "commercial ideal of individual freedom".

=== Middle career and sociology ===
At last, in 1917, Sombart became professor at the Friedrich Wilhelm University, succeeding his mentor Adolph Wagner. He remained in the chair until 1931 but continued teaching until 1940. During that period he was also one of the most renowned sociologists alive, more prominent a contemporary than even his friend Max Weber. Sombart's insistence on Sociology as a part of the Humanities (Geisteswissenschaften) – necessarily so because it dealt with human beings and therefore required inside, empathic "Verstehen" rather than the outside, objectivizing "Begreifen" (both German words translate as "understanding" into English) – became extremely unpopular already during his lifetime. It was seen as the opposite of the "scientification" of the social sciences, in the tradition of Auguste Comte, Émile Durkheim, and Max Weber – (although this is a misunderstanding since Weber largely shared Sombart's views in these matters) – which became fashionable during this time and has more or less remained so until today. However, because Sombart's approach has much in common with Hans-Georg Gadamer's Hermeneutics, which likewise is a Verstehen-based approach to understanding the world, he is coming back in some sociological and even philosophical circles that are sympathetic to that approach and critical towards the scientification of the world. Sombart's key sociological essays are collected in his posthumous 1956 work, Noo-Soziologie.

=== Late career and Nazism ===
During the Weimar Republic, Sombart became increasingly nationalist.

In 1934, he published Deutscher Sozialismus where he claimed a "new spirit" was beginning to "rule mankind". The age of capitalism and proletarian socialism was over, with "German socialism" (National-Socialism) taking over, which, he wrote, put the "welfare of the whole above the welfare of the individual". "German socialism" must effect a "total ordering of life" with a "planned economy in accordance with state regulations". The new legal system will confer on individuals "no rights but only duties", and "the state should never evaluate individual persons as such, but only the group which represents these persons". German socialism is accompanied by the Volksgeist (national spirit) which is not racial in the biological sense but metaphysical: "the German spirit in a Negro is quite as much within the realm of possibility as the Negro spirit in a German". The antithesis of the German spirit is the Jewish spirit, which is not a matter of being born Jewish or believing in Judaism but is a capitalistic spirit. The English people possess the Jewish spirit and the "chief task" of the German people and National Socialism is to destroy the Jewish spirit."

One of Sombart's daughters, Clara, was married to Hans Gerhard Creutzfeldt, who first described the Creutzfeldt–Jakob disease.

=== Legacy ===
Sombart's legacy today is difficult to ascertain because his Nazism made an objective reevaluation difficult (while his earlier socialism harmed him in bourgeois circles), especially in Germany. In economic history, his "Modern Capitalism" is regarded as a milestone and inspiration, although many details have been questioned. Key insights from his economic work concern the emergence of double-entry accounting as a key precondition for capitalism (a similar thesis was also discussed by Oswald Spengler) and the interdisciplinary study of the City in the sense of urban studies. Like Weber, Sombart makes double-entry bookkeeping system an important component of modern capitalism. He wrote in "Medieval and Modern Commercial Enterprise" that "The very concept of capital is derived from this way of looking at things; one can say that capital, as a category, did not exist before double-entry bookkeeping. Capital can be defined as that amount of wealth which is used in making profits and which enters into the accounts." He also coined the term and concept of creative destruction which is a key ingredient of Joseph Schumpeter's theory of innovation (Schumpeter actually borrowed heavily from Sombart, not always with proper reference to the original work by Sombart). In recent years, sociologists have shown renewed interest in Sombart's work.

== Bibliography ==
- Sombart, Werner (1905) [1896]: Sozialismus und soziale Bewegung. Jena: Verlag von Gustav Fischer. English translation: Socialism and the Social Movement in the 19th Century, New York: G.P. Putnam's Sons, 1898.
- Sombart, Werner (1909) [1903]: Die deutsche Volkswirtschaft im neunzehnten Jahrhundert. Berlin: G. Bondi.
- Sombart, Werner (1906): Das Proletariat. Bilder und Studien. Die Gesellschaft, vol. 1. Berlin: Rütten & Loening.
- Sombart, Werner (1906): Warum gibt es in den Vereinigten Staaten keinen Sozialismus? Tübingen: Mohr. Several English translations, incl. (1976): Why is there No Socialism in the United States? New York: Sharpe.
- Sombart, Werner (1911): Die Juden und das Wirtschaftsleben. Leipzig: Duncker. Translated into English: The Jews and Modern Capitalism., Batoche Books, Kitchener, 2001.
- Sombart, Werner: Der moderne Kapitalismus. Historisch-systematische Darstellung des gesamteuropäischen Wirtschaftslebens von seinen Anfängen bis zur Gegenwart. Final edn. 1928, repr. 1969, paperback edn. (3 vols. in 6): 1987 Munich: dtv. (Also in Spanish; no English translation yet.)
- Sombart, Werner (1913): Krieg und Kapitalismus. München: Duncker & Humblot, 1913.
- Sombart, Werner (1913): Der Bourgeois. München und Leipzig: Duncker & Humblot, 1913.
- Sombart, Werner (1913): Luxus und Kapitalismus. München: Duncker & Humblot, 1922. English translation: Luxury and capitalism. Ann Arbor: University of Michigan Press.
- Sombart, Werner (1915): Händler und Helden. München: Duncker & Humblot. 1915.
- Sombart, Werner (1929): Die drei Nationalökonomien: Geschichte und System der Lehre von der Wirtschaft München: Duncker & Humblot. 1929.
- Sombart, Werner (1934): Deutscher Sozialismus. Charlottenburg: Buchholz & Weisswange. English translation (1937, 1969): A New Social Philosophy. New York: Greenwood.
- Sombart, Werner (1938): Vom Menschen. Versuch einer geisteswissenschaftlichen Anthropologie. Berlin: Duncker & Humblot.
- Sombart, Werner (1956): Noo-Soziologie. Berlin: Duncker & Humblot.
- Sombart, Werner (2001): Economic Life in the Modern Age. Nico Stehr & Reiner Grundmann, eds. New Brunswick: Transaction. (New English translations of key articles and chapters by Sombart, including (1906) in full and the segment defining Capitalism from (1916))

== See also ==
- Werturteilsstreit
