= The Last Illusion =

1949 film

- Directed by: Josef von Báky
- Written by: Fritz Kortner
- Produced by: Richard König; Josef von Báky
- Starring: Fritz Kortner; Johanna Hofer; Lina Carstens
- Cinematography: Werner Krien
- Edited by: Wolfgang Becker
- Music by: Georg Haentzschel
- Production company: Objectiv Film
- Distributed by: Schorcht Filmverleih
- Release date: 19 April 1949
- Running time: 100 minutes
- Country: Germany
- Language: German

The Last Illusion (German: Der Ruf) is a 1949 German drama film directed by Josef von Báky and starring Fritz Kortner, Johanna Hofer and Lina Carstens. It was entered into the 1949 Cannes Film Festival. It was shot at the Bavaria Studios in Munich. The film's sets were designed by the art directors Fritz Lück, Fritz Maurischat and Hans Sohnle.

== Synopsis ==
A Jewish university professor returns from exile following the end of the Second World War. His hopes of rebuilding a new Germany are undermined by the continuing antisemitism of his colleagues and students.

== Cast ==
- Fritz Kortner as Professor Mauthner
- Johanna Hofer as Lina
- Rosemary Murphy as Mary
- Lina Carstens as Emma
- William Sinnigen as Elliot
- Michael Murphy as Spencer
- Ernst Schröder as Walter
- Paul Hoffmann as Fechner
- Arno Assmann as Kurt
- Charles Régnier as Bertram
- Alwin Edwards as Homer
- Harald Mannl as Fraenkl
- Friedrich Domin as Professor Helfert
- Hans Clarin
- Angelika Schrobsdorff
- Heinz Thiele

== Bibliography ==
- Hake, Sabine. German National Cinema. Routledge, 2002.
