= Maria Matray =

German actress (1907–1993)

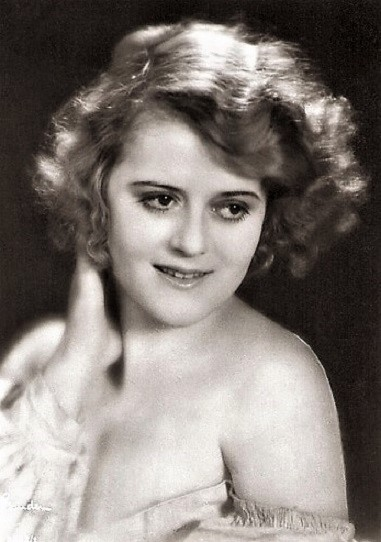
- Matray in the 1920s
- Born: Maria Charlotte Stern; 14 July 1907; Niederschönhausen, Germany
- Died: 30 October 1993 (aged 86); Munich, Germany
- Resting place: Munich Waldfriedhof
- Other name: Maria Solveg
- Occupations: Actress, writer, choreographer
- Years active: 1923–1993
- Relatives: Johanna Hofer (sister); Käthe Kollwitz (aunt)

Maria Matray (born Maria Charlotte Stern; 14 July 1907 – 30 October 1993) was a German screenwriter and film actress. She became a star of late Weimar cinema.

== Biography ==
Following the Nazi takeover in 1933, Matray, who was Jewish, went into exile – initially in France and Britain before moving to the United States. She developed a new career as a choreographer and writer. She later returned to Germany after the Second World War, where she died in 1993.

Maria Matray was born in Niederschönhausen. She was the daughter of engineer and later director of AEG Georg Stern and his wife Lisbeth (née Schmidt), who was the younger sister of artist Käthe Kollwitz. Matray's older sisters were actress Johanna Hofer and dancer Katta Sterna. Hofer's father was Jewish and her mother was Lutheran.

== Selected filmography ==
=== Actress ===
- The Master of Nuremberg (1927)
- Linden Lady on the Rhine (1927)
- Inherited Passions (1929)
- The Son of the White Mountain (1930)
- Never Trust a Woman (1930)
- Retreat on the Rhine (1930)
- Elisabeth of Austria (1931)
- Road to Rio (1931)
- The Ringer (1932)
- Secret Agent (1932)
- Distorting at the Resort (1932)
- A Man with Heart (1933)

=== Screenwriter ===
- Murder in the Music Hall (dir. John English, 1946)
- Invitation Playhouse: Mind Over Murder: The Last Act (dir. William Asher, 1952, TV series episode)
- Der König mit dem Regenschirm (dir. Ernst Matray, 1954, TV film) – based on an operetta by Ralph Benatzky
- Abschiedsvorstellung (dir. Ernst Matray, 1955, TV film)
- My Father, the Actor (dir. Robert Siodmak, 1956)
- The Night of the Storm (dir. Falk Harnack, 1957) – based on a novel by Klaus Hellmer
- Und abends in die Scala (dir. Erik Ode, 1958)
- Frau im besten Mannesalter (dir. Axel von Ambesser, 1959)
- The Night Before the Premiere (dir. Georg Jacoby, 1959)
- Die schöne Lügnerin (dir. Axel von Ambesser, 1959) – based on a play by Ernst Nebhut and Just Scheu
- Waldhausstraße 20 (dir. John Olden, 1960, TV film)
- The Happy Years of the Thorwalds (dir. Wolfgang Staudte, John Olden, 1962) – based on Time and the Conways by J. B. Priestley
- Das Kriminalmuseum (1963–1968, TV series, 4 episodes)
- Das Kriminalgericht: Der Fall Krantz (dir. Georg Tressler, 1964, TV series episode)
- Der Prozeß Carl von O. (dir. John Olden, 1964, TV film) – (docudrama about the Weltbühne-Prozess)
- Die fünfte Kolonne (1964–1965, TV series, 3 episodes)
- Ein langer Tag (dir. Lothar Kompatzki, 1964, TV film)
- Der Fall Harry Domela (dir. Wolfgang Schleif, 1965, TV film) – (docudrama about Harry Domela)
- Klaus Fuchs – Geschichte eines Atomverrats (dir. Ludwig Cremer, 1965, TV film) – (docudrama about Klaus Fuchs)
- Bernhard Lichtenberg (dir. Peter Beauvais, 1965, TV film) – (docudrama about Bernhard Lichtenberg)
- Oberst Wennerström (dir. Helmut Ashley, 1965, TV film) – (docudrama about Stig Wennerström)
- Der Mann, der sich Abel nannte (dir. Ludwig Cremer, 1966, TV film) – (docudrama about Rudolf Abel)
- Standgericht (dir. Rolf Busch, 1966, TV film)
- Der schwarze Freitag (dir. August Everding, 1966, TV film) – (docudrama about the Wall Street crash of 1929)
- Der Fall Lothar Malskat (dir. Günter Meincke, 1966, TV film) – (docudrama about Lothar Malskat)
- Das Millionending (dir. Helmut Ashley, 1966, TV film) – based on a story by Henry Kolarz
- Der Panamaskandal (dir. Paul Verhoeven, 1967, TV film) – (docudrama about the Panama scandals)
- Affäre Dreyfus (dir. Franz Josef Wild, 1968, TV film) – (docudrama about the Dreyfus affair)
- Der Senator (dir. Günter Gräwert, 1968, TV film) – (docudrama about Joseph McCarthy)
- Hotel Royal (dir. Wolfgang Becker, 1969, TV film)
- Maximilian von Mexiko (dir. Günter Gräwert, 1970, TV film) – (docudrama about the Second French intervention in Mexico)
- Millionen nach Maß (dir. Erich Neureuther, 1970, TV film) – (crime comedy based on the Portuguese Bank Note Crisis)
- Der Hitler/Ludendorff-Prozeß (dir. Paul Verhoeven, 1971, TV film) – (docudrama about the trial after the Beer Hall Putsch 1923)
- Manolescu – Die fast wahre Biographie eines Gauners (dir. Hans Quest, 1972, TV film) – (crime comedy about Georges Manolescu)
- Doppelspiel in Paris (dir. Wolfgang Glück, 1972, TV film) – (docudrama about Mathilde Carré)
- Sonderdezernat K1 (1972–1975, TV series, 12 episodes)
- Agent aus der Retorte (dir. Wolfgang Glück, 1972, TV film) – (docudrama about Operation Mincemeat)
- Eine geschiedene Frau: Reise nach Stockholm (dir. Claus Peter Witt, 1974, TV series episode)
- Wie starb Dag Hammerskjöld? (dir. Oswald Döpke, 1975, TV film) – (docudrama about the 1961 Ndola United Nations DC-6 crash)
- Als wär's ein Stück von mir (dir. August Everding, 1976, TV film) – based on the autobiography of Carl Zuckmayer
- Diener und andere Herren (dir. Wolfgang Glück, 1978, anthology film, TV film) – based on short stories by O. Henry, P. G. Wodehouse and W. Somerset Maugham
- The Old Fox: Der schöne Alex (dir. Theodor Grädler, 1978, TV series episode)
- Auf Schusters Rappen (dir. Manfred Seide, 1981, TV film)
- Sun, Wine and Hard Nuts (1981, TV series, 2 episodes)
- Ein Winter auf Mallorca (dir. Imo Moszkowicz, 1982, TV film)
- Crooks in Paradise (dir. Thomas Fantl, 1985, TV film)
- Im Schatten von Gestern (dir. Thomas Hartwig, 1985, TV film) – screenplay with Nathaniel Gutman
- Wie das Leben so spielt (dir. Hermann Leitner, 1986, TV film)
- Jungbrunnen (dir. Dušan Rapoš, 1992, TV film)

== Bibliography ==
- Weniger, Kay. 'Es wird im Leben dir mehr genommen als gegeben ...' Lexikon der aus Deutschland und Österreich emigrierten Filmschaffenden 1933 bis 1945: Eine Gesamtübersicht. ACABUS Verlag, 2011.
