= Johanna Hofer =

German actress (1896–1988)

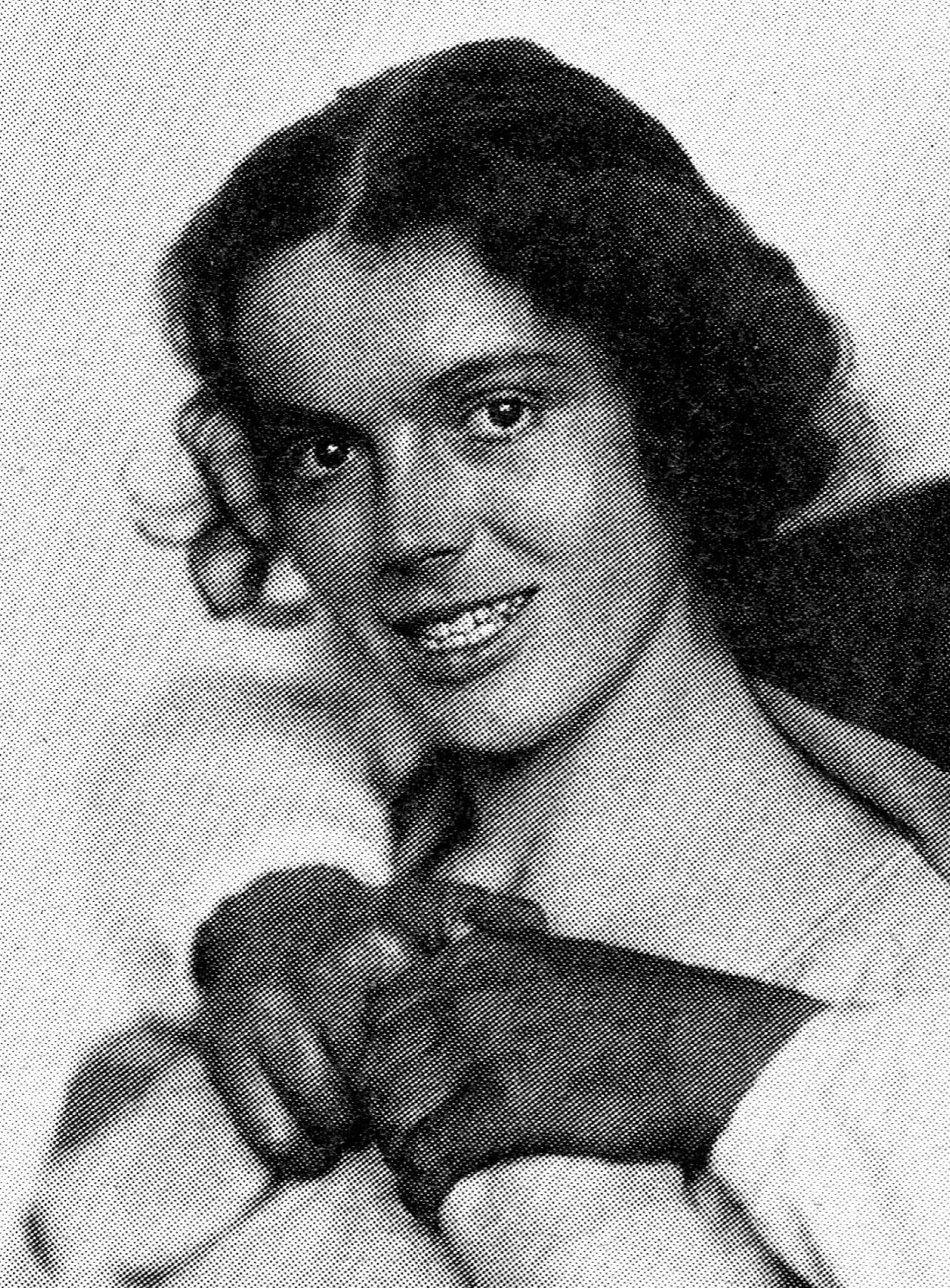
- Hofer in Othello (1921)
- Born: Johanna Therese Stern; 30 July 1896; Berlin, German Empire
- Died: 30 June 1988 (aged 91); Munich, West Germany
- Resting place: Munich Waldfriedhof
- Occupation: Actress
- Years active: 1926–1982
- Spouse: Fritz Kortner (m. 1924; died 1970)
- Children: 2
- Relatives: Maria Matray (sister); Käthe Kollwitz (aunt)

Johanna Hofer (born Johanna Therese Stern; 30 July 1896 – 30 June 1988) was a German film actress. She appeared in 34 films between 1926 and 1982.

== Biography ==
Hofer was born in Berlin. She was the daughter of engineer and later director of AEG Georg Stern and his wife Lisbeth (née Schmidt), who was the younger sister of artist Käthe Kollwitz. Hofer's younger sisters were dancer Katta Sterna and actress Maria Matray. Hofer's father was Jewish and her mother was Lutheran. In 1932, Hofer and her husband, Austrian actor Fritz Kortner, left Germany and lived in Switzerland, then Austria and the United Kingdom, before settling in the United States in 1938. In 1941, the couple moved from New York City to Los Angeles.

== Filmography ==
Year	Title	Role	Notes
1926	Die Schwester vom Roten Kreuz – Ein Lebenslauf		
1927	Die Ausgestoßenen	Frau des Gefangenen	
1943	Above Suspicion	Frau Kleist	
1943	Hitler's Madman	Frau Magda Bauer	Uncredited
1945	Hotel Berlin	Frau Plottke	Uncredited
1949	The Last Illusion	Lina	
1951	The Lost One	Frau Hermann	
1952	Toxi	Grossmutter Helene	
1956	Before Sundown	Frau Peters, Inkens Mutter	
1957	The Big Chance	Großmutter Degner	
1957	A Farewell to Arms	Mrs. Zimmerman	
1958	A Song Goes Round the World	Frau von Hilden	
1959	Dubrowsky	Maria Jegorowna	
1973	Im Reservat	Frau Minkwitz	TV film
1973	The Pedestrian	Frau Bergedorf	
1976	Derrick	Frau Balte	Season 3, Episode 7: "Kein schöner Sonntag"
1980	Groß und Klein	Alte	
1981	Possession	Heinrich's Mother	
1982	Veronika Voss	Alte Frau	
