= Heinemann Vogelstein =

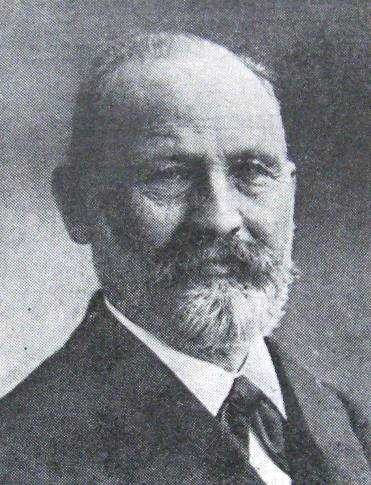
- Rabbi Vogelstein during his tenure in Pilsen
- Born: Heinemann Vogelstein; February 13, 1841; Lage, North Rhine-Westphalia
- Died: August 4, 1911 (age 70); St. Moritz, Switzerland
- Occupation: Rabbi
- Children: Hermann Vogelstein; Theodor Vogelstein; Ludwig Vogelstein; Julie Braun-Vogelstein
- Parent(s): Julie Adler Vogelstein; Israel Vogelstein

Heinemann Vogelstein (February 13, 1841 - August 4, 1911) was a German rabbi and leader of Reform Judaism in Germany.

== Biography ==
Heinemann Vogelstein was born in Lippe on February 13, 1841, the son of Julie (née Adler) and Israel Vogelstein. In 1859, he began his studies at University of Wroclaw and then at the Jewish Theological Seminary of Breslau where he received his PhD in 1865 (his thesis was entitled 'Die Alexandersage bei den Orientalen). In 1861, he became a member of the Hochschule für die Wissenschaft des Judentums.

He was rabbi in Pilsen (1868-1880) and Stettin (from 1880 until his death), founder and chairman (until his death) of the Vereinigung der liberalen Rabbiner (Union of Liberal Rabbis) and Deputy Chairman of the Vereinigung für das Liberale Judentum in Deutschland (Union for Liberal Judaism in Germany). From 1894 to 1896 he published a book of prayers in two volumes in which all references to Jewish nationalism had been eliminated.

As an opponent of Zionism he joined the protest movement in 1897 and published a pamphlet in 1906 entitled Der Zionismus, eine Gefahr für die gedeihliche Entwickelung des Judentums (Zionism, a Danger to the Prosperous Development of Judaism). In 1889, he wrote Kampf zwischen Priestern und Leviten seit den Tagen Ezechiels (Struggle between priests and the Levites since the days of Ezekiel).

In 1928, a street was named after him in Szczecin.

== Personal life ==
Vogelstein was the father of Hermann Vogelstein, Ludwig Vogelstein, Theodor Vogelstein, and Julie Braun-Vogelstein. He died on August 4, 1911, in St. Moritz.
