= Julie Braun-Vogelstein =

Art historian, author, editor, and journalist (1883–1971)

- Braun-Vogelstein in 1934
- Born: Julie Braun-Vogelstein; 1883; Szczecin
- Died: 1971 (age 89); New York City, New York
- Occupations: Art historian, author, editor, and journalist
- Spouse: Heinrich Braun
- Parent: Heinemann Vogelstein
- Relatives: Hermann Vogelstein (brother); Theodor Vogelstein (brother); Ludwig Vogelstein (brother)

Julie Braun-Vogelstein (1883 – 1971) was a German-born American art historian, author, editor, and journalist.

== Biography ==
She was born in Stettin in Germany (now Szczecin, Poland). Julie Vogelstein was the daughter of rabbi Heinemann Vogelstein and sister of rabbi de:Hermann Vogelstein, and industrialists Ludwig Vogelstein and de:Theodor Vogelstein. She studied art history and Egyptology at the Ludwig-Maximilians-Universität München and the Friedrich Wilhelm University of Berlin. In 1919, she received her PhD from Heidelberg University. In 1935, she left Germany for France and later the United States. In 1936, she went to California, and she lived in Carmel from time-to-time thereafter. She was a member of the board of the Leo Baeck Institute.

She was the secretary of Heinrich Braun (1854–1927), and became his second wife after the death of his wife Lily Braun (1865–1916). She was also the editor of Lily Braun's Collected Works.

She wrote and edited many books; for example she wrote Art: The Image of the West (1952) and edited The Diary of Otto Braun (1924). Otto Braun was her stepson, who died in World War I.

Her husband died in 1927; they did not have any children. Braun-Vogelstein died in New York City. Services were held at Riverside Memorial Chapel.
