= Ludwig Vogelstein =

Jewish American industrialist and philanthropist

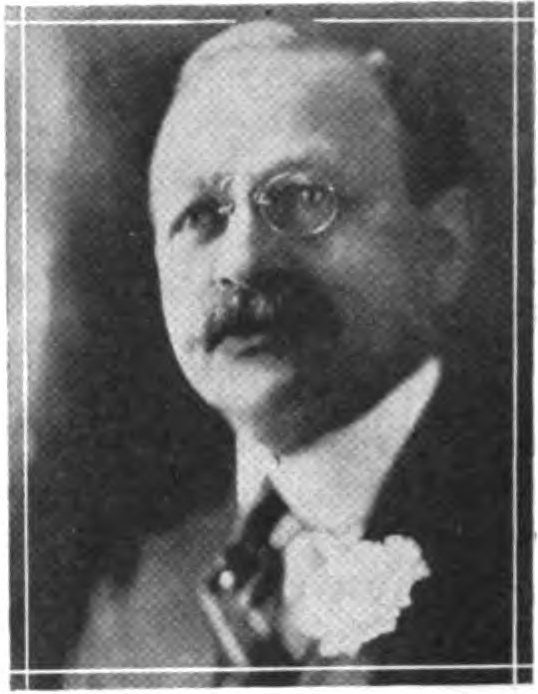
- Vogelstein c. 1923
- Born: Ludwig Vogelstein; February 3, 1871; Plzeň, Austria-Hungary
- Died: September 23, 1934 (aged 63); New York City, U.S.
- Occupation: Industrialist
- Parent: Heinemann Vogelstein
- Relatives: Hermann Vogelstein (brother); Theodor Vogelstein (brother); Julie Braun-Vogelstein (sister)

Ludwig Vogelstein (February 3, 1871 – September 23, 1934) was a Bohemian-born American industrialist and philanthropist.

== Biography ==
Vogelstein was born to a Jewish family in Plzeň, Austria-Hungary (now the Czech Republic) in 1871. he was the second son of rabbi Heinemann Vogelstein and sibling of de:Hermann Vogelstein, de:Theodor Vogelstein, and Julie Braun-Vogelstein. In Germany, he worked for Aron Hirsch & Sohn, then one of the largest metal traders in the world. In 1897, he moved from Halberstadt to the USA where he established his own metal trading firm under the name L. Vogelstein & Co., financed by the Hirsch family who retained a 35% interest. The Hirsch family used his firm as a means of strengthening relationships with US brass and copper producers and Vogelstein had a ready market to sell his materials.

Vogelstein was a staunch supporter and leader of Reform Judaism, an opponent of Zionism, and served as vice-president of the World Union for Progressive Judaism. He died on September 23, 1934, in New York City.

== Literature (selection) ==
- Encyclopedia of Judaism , Gütersloh etc. 1971, Sp. 837
