= Rudolf Borchardt =

German essayist, poet and historian

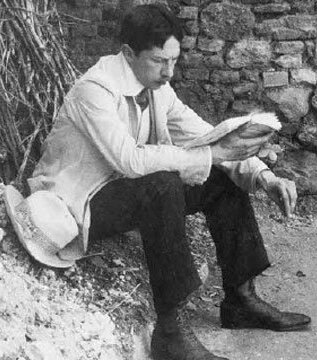
Rudolf Borchardt in Italy

Rudolf Borchardt (b. 9 June 1877 in Königsberg, Kingdom of Prussia, German Empire; d. 10 January 1945 in Trins, Ostmark, German Reich) was a German essayist, poet and cultural historian. He is perhaps best known for translating Dante's Divine Comedy into his own type of German language. The German classical philologist Ernst A. Schmidt has called Borchardt "one of the most problematic figures in early twentieth-century European cultural history" and "one of Germany's finest poets."

== Life ==
=== Early life and education ===
Borchardt was born into a middle class Protestant, formerly Jewish family, the son of Robert Martin Borchardt (1848–1908) and his wife Rose (née Bernstein) (1854–1943). He was educated at the Royal School in Wesel. According to one of his biographers, Kai Kauffmann, he had a "narcissistic personality" from a young age. Borchardt studied theology in Berlin before changing to study classical philology and archeology. He continued these studies at the University of Bonn and the University of Göttingen in 1896, and also studied German and Egyptology.

In 1898, Borchardt began to work on a doctoral dissertation on Greek poetry that was not completed. After personal crises and a serious illness in February 1901 Borchardt decided against a university career. In January 1902 Borchardt fell out with his father when the latter refused to subsidise his expensive lifestyle with a monthly allowance.

=== Travels, writing, and public speaking ===
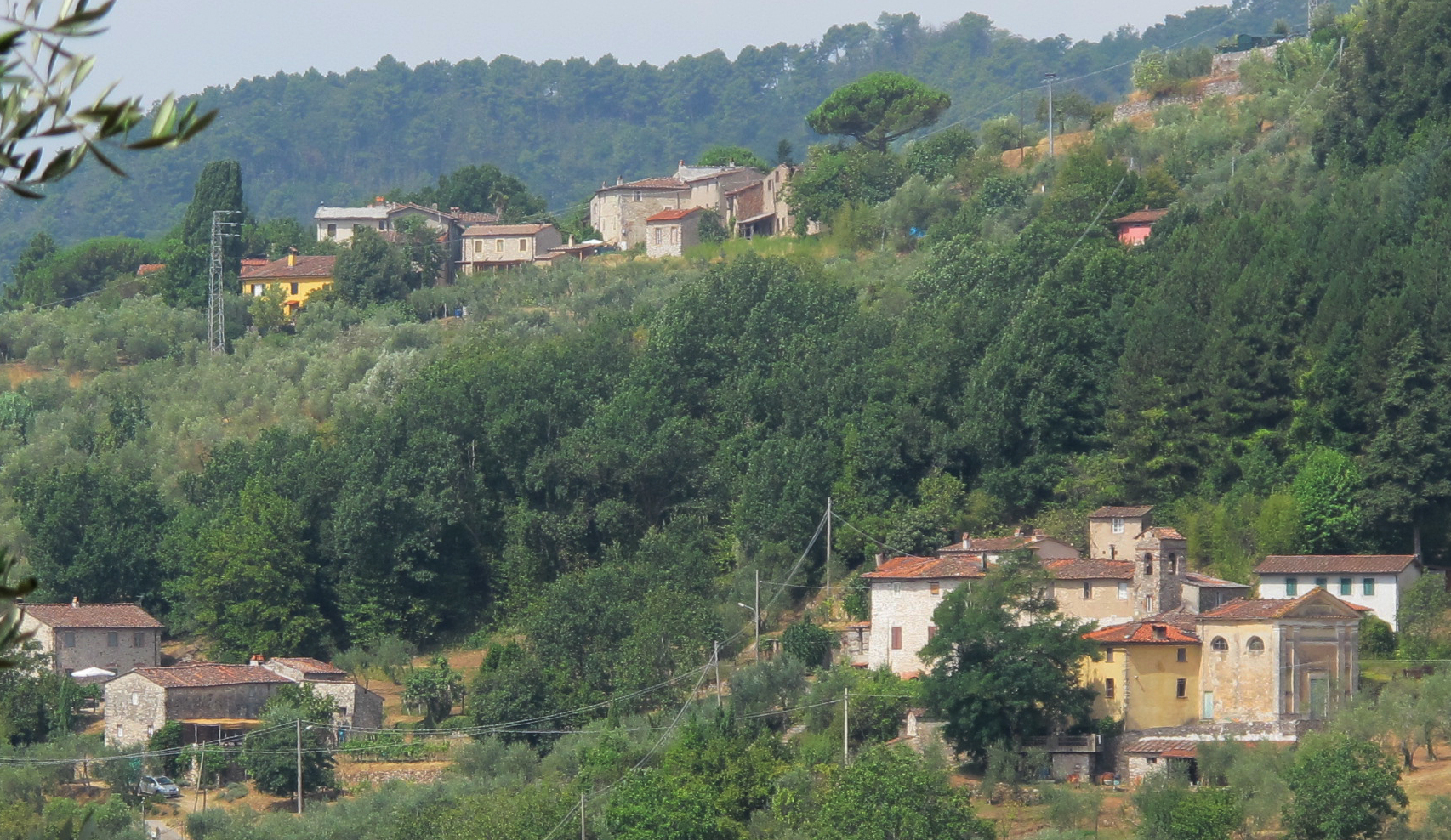
Monsagrati

Borchardt was inspired by the writings of his contemporaries, mainly that of Austrian writer Hugo von Hofmannsthal, whom he admired. He travelled widely and visited von Hofmannsthal in Rodaun, near Vienna. One such meeting, in 1902, resulted in Borchardt writing a series of essays on the subject of his friend and mentor's works. Borchardt was a popular public speaker and his lectures attracted large crowds. From 1903, during a visit to Italy, he began writing prose. The first works of fiction were allegorical in style and strongly poetic in language. In 1903 he moved to Italy, living in a villa in Monsagrati in Lucca, in Tuscany, with a few interruptions.

=== Marriage, World War I, divorce, and remarriage ===
In 1906, Borchardt married the painter Karoline Ehrmann in London and returned with her to Italy, from where, as a sought-after speaker, he went on numerous lecture tours to Germany until 1933. From the beginning of the First World War he returned to Germany and was an infantry NCO (Unteroffizier) before being appointed to the German General Staff where he served as an intelligence officer. During the war he gave speeches in which he advocated the imposition of Germanic order on all of European culture. After the divorce from Karoline in 1919, Borchardt married Marie Luise "Marel" Voigt in 1920, a niece of Rudolf Alexander Schröder, with whom he had been friends for a long time. From this marriage there were four children.

=== Weimar era ===
In 1921 Borchardt returned to Italy. His literary output became more political and polemical, partly in order to make his income more secure, but he managed to produce a collection of stories, The Hopeless Race: Four Contemporary Tales (1929), which found a large audience across Europe.

In the early 1930s he wrote his only full-length novel. As the political situation in Germany worsened and the Weimar Republic grew ever weaker, Borchardt continued his political writings, many of which displayed strong fascist overtones.

=== Nazi era ===
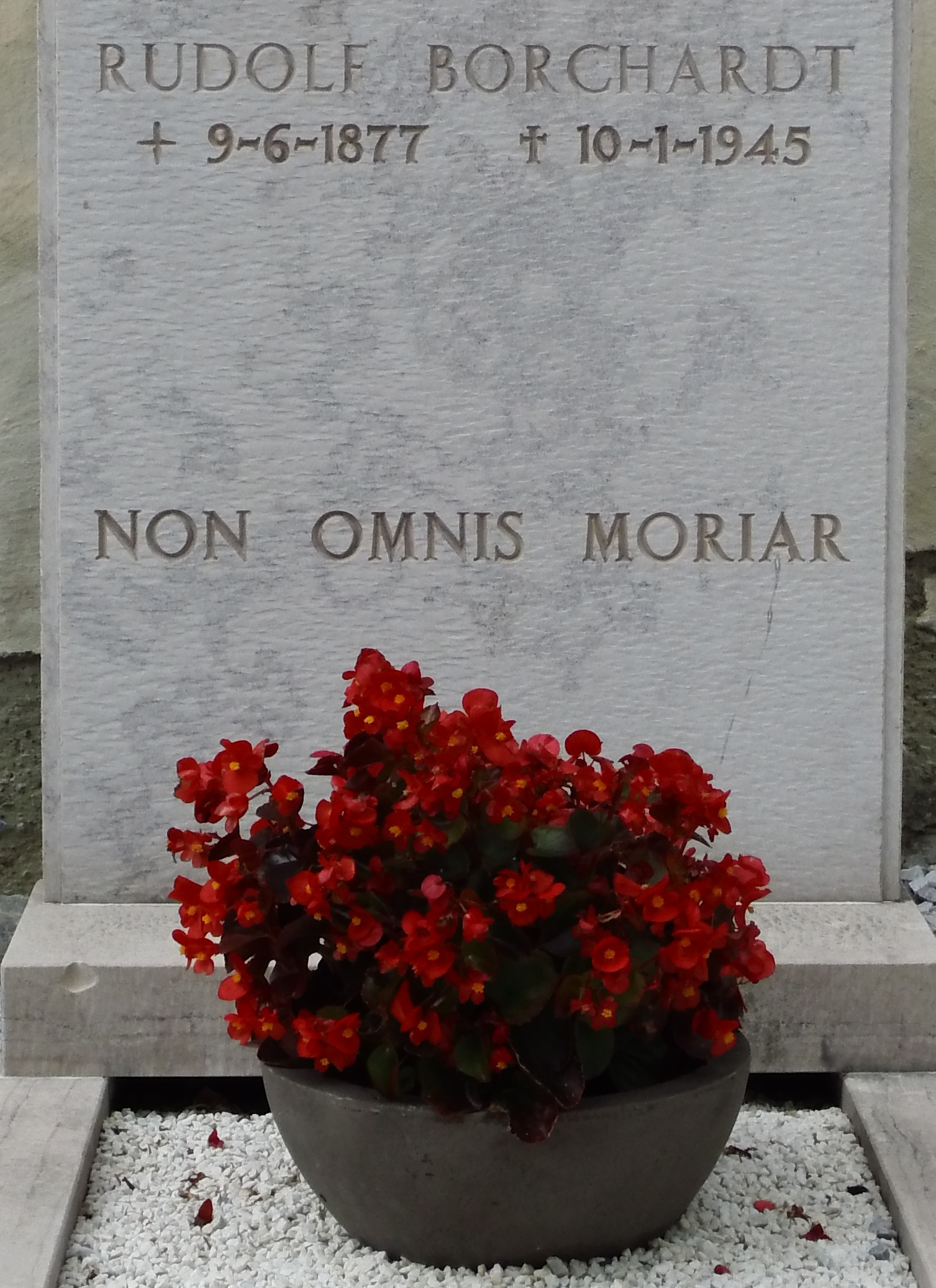
Memorial in Trins, Tyrol

Due to his Jewish heritage, Borchardt lived a withdrawn life in Italy from 1933, unable to visit loved ones in Germany. Yet in April 1933 he handed a copy of his Dante's Divine Comedy to Mussolini, who admired Borchardt's work. In August 1944, Borchardt and his wife, Marie Luise, were arrested by the SS in Italy and transported to Innsbruck. After their release, they hid in the Tyrol.

For a long time Borchardt's writings were out of print, at first suppressed in Germany by the Nazi regime and then simply forgotten. However, there has been something of a renaissance in scholarly interest in his work.
