= Heinrich Braun (writer) =

German Social Democrat and writer

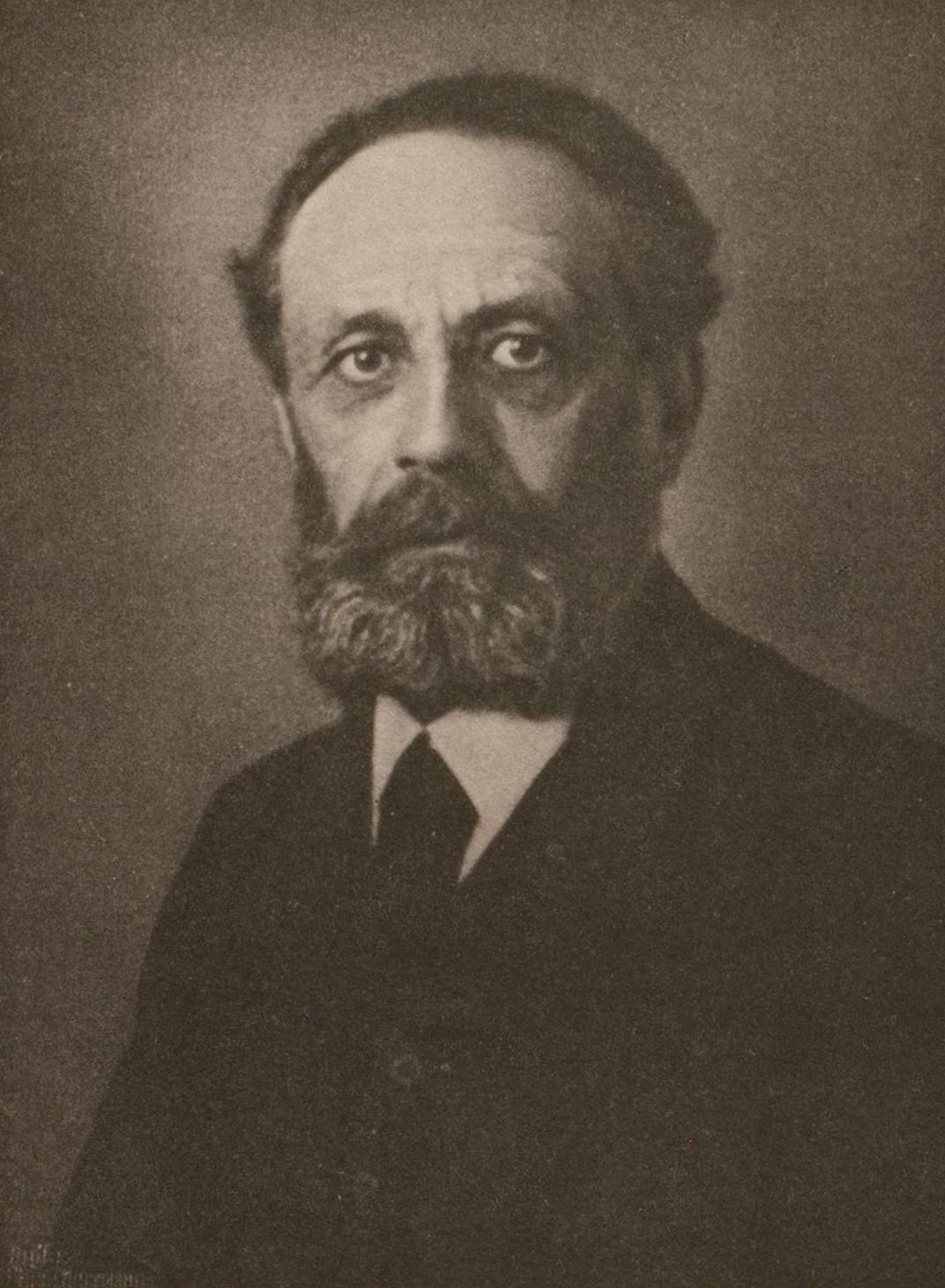
Image of Heinrich Braun

Heinrich Braun (23 November 1854 Budapest – 9 February 1927 Berlin) was a German Social Democrat and writer on social questions.

== Biography ==
Heinrich Braun was a childhood classmate of Sigmund Freud during their Gymnasium (high school) years, influencing the young Freud for a time to contemplate a career in politics or law. He studied at University of Vienna, University of Strasbourg, University of Göttingen, Humboldt University of Berlin and University of Halle-Wittenberg. He successively edited several socialist publications: Die Neue Zeit, the Archiv für soziale Gesetzgebung und Verwaltung, Die neue Gesellschaft, and Annalen für Sozialpolitik und Gesetzgebung. In 1895, he married German feminist writer Lily Gizycki. On March 24, 1919, after the German Revolution of 1918–19 and the election of a Prussian constituent assembly, Braun became Minister for Agriculture in the Prussian socialist ministry formed under the presidency of Paul Hirsch.
