= Life chances =

Social science theory

Life chances (Lebenschancen in German) is a theory in sociology which refers to the opportunities each individual has to improve their quality of life. The concept was introduced by German sociologist Max Weber in the 1920s. It is a probabilistic concept, describing how likely it is, given certain factors, that an individual's life will turn out a certain way. According to this theory, life chances are positively correlated with one's socioeconomic status.

Opportunities in this sense refer to the extent to which one has access to resources, both tangible ones such as food, clothing and shelter, and intangible ones such as education and health care. Life chances comprise the individual's ability to procure goods, have a career and obtain inner satisfaction; in other words, the ability to satisfy one's needs.

== Theory ==
Weberian life chances can be seen as an expansion on some of Karl Marx's ideas. Both Weber and Marx agreed that economic factors were important in determining one's future, but Weber's concepts of life chances are more complex; inspired by, but different from Marx's views on social stratification and social class. Where for Marx the class status was the most important factor, and he correlated life chances with material wealth, Weber introduced such additional factors as social mobility and social equality. Other factors include those related to one's socioeconomic status, such as gender, race, and ethnicity.

While some of those factors, like age, race or gender, are random, Weber stressed the link between life chances and the non-random elements of the three-component theory of stratification – how social class, social status and political affiliation affect each individual's life. In other words, individuals in certain groups have in common a specific causal component of their life chances: they are in similar situation, which tends to imply a similar outcome to their actions. Weber notes the importance of economic factors: how the power of those with property, compared to those without property, gives the former great advantages over the latter.

Weber also noted that life chances are to certain extent subjective: one's assessment of one's life chances will affect one's actions; therefore, if one believes that one is or can become a respected and valued member of society, that outcome and associated positive results are more likely to become a reality for such a person than they are for one without this conviction. Persons without such a belief, especially those who consciously espouse or have unconsciously internalized a belief to the contrary, are vulnerable to learned helplessness and its long-term effects.

In terms of agency and structure, life chances represent the structure, the factors that one has no control over; whereas one's life conduct – values and beliefs, attitude to risk taking, social skills, or more generally, free willed choices about one's behavior – represent the factors one has control over. According to Weber theories, together with life conduct, life chances are responsible for one's lifestyle.

In social engineering, life chances may have to be balanced against other goals, such as eliminating poverty, ensuring personal freedom or ensuring equality at birth.

== Ascriptive qualities ==
The life chances approach suggests that status is not entirely achieved, but is, to some extent, ascribed. The idea of life chances is that socioeconomic status and social locations positively correlate to the opportunities and quality of those opportunities that one has. It presents the probability of a person's life to follow a particular path, generally one similar to their parents’. Overall, in societies emphasizing ascription, opportunity is relatively low and status (in the sense of prestige in the community) is often inherited. This means that people are, effectively, given their status as a result of the group into which they are born, rather than earning it entirely on merit. Ascriptive qualities such as race/ethnicity, gender, and class of origin can all affect one's life chances. In all societies parents pass on whatever advantages and disadvantages they have to their children.

A person's class of origin determines one's neighborhood they live in, which in turn will affect educational attainment, the people they socialize with, and ultimately their class identification. A very important factor affecting life chances is housing and the general inequalities in the real-estate market. Poorer housing will affect health, available facilities, the likelihood of being a victim of crime, and many other aspects of life. Leisure facilities are often located in middle class areas or near non manual work places. Gym membership is expensive and subsidies are rarely available for lower grade staff. Therefore, in general, the middle and upper classes have far greater life chances available than the less advantaged groups.

If born into a wealthy family a person will have access to far more desirable resources that can assist them in further enhancing their life chances to a far greater extent than someone who is born into a working class poor family. One of these resources includes a family's social ties and the ability for a person with well connected parents to benefit greatly in the status attainment process. Status attainment refers to how each individual enters an occupation. This encompasses how both ascribed and achieved factors combine, because each individual enters an occupation based on the way their parents’ status produces advantages and disadvantages, their own efforts and abilities, and a degree of luck.

An additional dimension is the effect of family dynamics on life chances, such as the presence of biological parents, the quality of family relationships, and sibling configuration. For example, it has been demonstrated that children of divorced parents exhibit lower levels of psychological well-being, more problems in their own relationship, a greater risk of experiencing divorce, and also tend to be less educated.

== Overcoming bad life chances ==
Max Weber discussed the effects of social stratification on life chances. He argued that life chances are opportunities and possibilities that make up one's lifestyle. Life chances are affected by a number of factors. Some of which include: income, social class, and occupational prestige. These factors all affect the availability of resources to an individual. For example, when one has low income, they have low life chances. Their education may not be as great and they may not have a high enough income to attain an advanced level of education. According to Wout Ultee, education is a major aspect of overcoming life chances. Without an education, it is harder to obtain a job that provides a substantial income to provide for a family of four. “Higher education is the way to stay ahead." The higher the education, the higher income and occupational prestige one will have, which results in more resources for an individual and his family.

Early intervention is also necessary in improving life chances. Save the Children is a non-governmental group that works in the best interest of children. They promote children's rights and the aid children in underdeveloped countries that need relief. The UK has started an early intervention program that aids in improving life chances early on a child's life. They believe that "No child should endure poverty and no child's life chances should be shaped by the accident of birth." This program was made to ensure that inequalities in children's learning are tackled before problems can occur and separate them from peers. In order to do so, this program gives parents in lower classes the expertise they need to effectively help their children's learning in a home environment so that they are well prepared when they enter school. An example would be improving the parents' reading level so that they are able to teach their children how to read and write before kindergarten. This allows children in lower classes to be near the same level as children who are in higher classes with higher educated parents. Early intervention will allow for children to start out their education on the right foot, with skills they will need to succeed and achieve a high level of education, thus improving life chances.

== Class identification and lifestyle effects ==
Weber noted that life chances are partially determined by subjective factors, such as by how one perceives their life chances. How one perceives their life chances is in large part determined by what one perceives their social class to be since life chances and social class go hand in hand and both reinforce each other. According to Weber this is because life chances are largely determined by economic factors such as social class. The phenomenon of how you perceive things actually affecting the tangible outcomes of life chances is explained by Robert K. Merton's theory of "self fulfilling prophecy" which he discusses in his book Social Theory and Social Structure. Essentially what it means is that individuals can tell themselves something like, "I'm lower class, my family has always been lower class, there's no chance I'm ever going to be well off" and although this statement had the potential to not end up being true, it became true simply because the individual believed it would be so and through his attitude and lack of self-esteem, made it his reality.

If you identify as low social class and believe you are most likely never going to be anything else, this will affect your life conduct in a myriad of ways. which in turn will affect your life chances. For one, the company you keep can lead to you networking with people that will not help you get out of a low socioeconomic environment. It can also affect your life conduct by making you think you are not qualified enough for anything but working class jobs. It can also affect your life conduct by making you think that pursuing higher education is not for someone of your social standing, further ensuring that you never get above working class work. The relationship between social class, life conduct, and life chances is a strong one that often decides what a person's fate in life will be like.

== See also ==
- Primary goods
- Social mobility
- The Bell Curve
- Social position
- Social stratification
