= Status inconsistency =

Concept in sociology

Status inconsistency is a situation where an individual's social positions have both positive and negative influences on their social status. For example, a teacher may have a positive societal image (respect, prestige) which increases their status but may earn little money, which simultaneously decreases their status.

Advocates of the concept propose that status inconsistency has consequences for social action that cannot be predicted from the so-called "vertical" dimensions of status alone. (In statistical terms, it is an interaction effect). Introduced by Gerhard Lenski in the 1950s, the concept has remained controversial with limited empirical verification. One unresolved question is whether people who are judged by sociologists to be status inconsistent actually feel they are somehow under-rewarded or over-rewarded. Blocker and Riedesel (1978) employed more than the usual statistical controls and found evidence of neither a correlation between "objective" and "subjective" status inconsistency, nor of effects of either on hypothesized behavior that was independent of the vertical dimensions of status.

== General description ==
All societies have some basis for social stratification, and industrial societies are characterized by multiple dimensions to which some vertical hierarchy may be imputed. The notion of status inconsistency is simple: it is defined as occupying different vertical positions in two or more hierarchies. The complexity and dynamism of modern societies results in both social mobility, and the presence of people and social roles in these inconsistent or mixed status positions. Sociologists investigate issues of status inconsistency in order to better understand status systems and stratification, and because some sociologists believe that positions of status inconsistency might have strong effects on people's behavior. In this line of reasoning people may react to an inconsistent status position as problematic, and thus may change their behavior, their patterns of sociation, or otherwise act to resolve the inconsistent position. During the last fifty years social researchers have investigated and debated evidence about how, where, why, and to what extent status inconsistency affects social action.

Most attention has been given to inconsistency between material status and prestige or respect, arising from education, occupation, or ethnicity. Geschwender (1967), among others, suggests that the balance of investments (e.g. education) versus rewards (e.g. income) is at the heart of any actual effects of apparent status inconsistency.

== Theory and its development ==
Max Weber articulated three major dimensions of stratification in his discussion of class, power, and status. This multifaceted framework provides the background concepts for discussing status inconsistency. Status Inconsistency theories predict that people whose status is inconsistent, or higher on one dimension than one another, will be more frustrated and dissatisfied than people with consistent statuses. Gerhard Lenski was a major proponent of this theory. He argues that if people are ranked higher in one dimension than another, then they are going to emphasize their higher rank. Since others may focus instead on the former's lower rank, the situation may generate conflict.

Lenski originally predicted that people suffering from Status Inconsistency will favor political actions and parties directed against higher status groups. Lenski continues by stating that Status Inconsistency can be used to further explain the phenomenon of why status groups made up of wealthy minorities will tend to be liberal instead of the presumed conservative. In the 1950s and 1960s, American Jews provided a strong anecdotal example: Politically liberal, better educated and more affluent than average, they were still subjected to discrimination in subtle and not-so-subtle ways.

== Outstanding issues ==
While well-known, the concept of status inconsistency is not without its challengers and unresolved questions.

- Can status inconsistency be reliably measured independent of the constituent vertical dimensions of stratification?
- Can the hypothesized social psychological mechanism (e.g. feeling of being under-rewarded) for the effects of status inconsistency be validated?
- Can consistent empirical effects be found at all outside the narrow spectrum of American politics?

== See also ==
- Status–income disequilibrium
- Status set
