= Role theory =

Concept in sociology and social psychology

Role theory (or social role theory) is a concept in sociology and in social psychology that considers most of everyday activity to be the acting-out of socially defined categories (e.g., mother, manager, teacher). Each role is a set of rights, duties, expectations, norms, and behaviors that a person has to face and fulfill. The model is based on the observation that people behave in a predictable way, and that an individual's behavior is context specific, based on social position and other factors. Research conducted on role theory mainly centers around the concepts of consensus, role conflict, role taking, and conformity.

Although the word role has existed in European languages for centuries, as a sociological concept, the term has only been around since the 1920s and 1930s. It became more prominent in sociological discourse through the theoretical works of George Herbert Mead, Jacob L. Moreno, Talcott Parsons, Ralph Linton, and Georg Simmel. Two of Mead's concepts—the mind and the self—are the precursors to role theory.

Depending on the general perspective of the theoretical tradition, there are many types of role theory, however, it may be divided into two major types, in particular: structural functionalism role theory and dramaturgical role theory. Structural functionalism role theory is essentially defined as everyone having a place in the social structure and every place had a corresponding role, which has an equal set of expectations and behaviors. Life is more structured, and there is a specific place for everything. In contrast, dramaturgical role theory defines life as a never-ending play, in which we are all actors. The essence of this role theory is to role-play in an acceptable manner in society.

Robert Kegan’s theory of adult development plays a role in understanding role theory. Three pivotal sections in his theory are first the socialized mind. People in this mindset, base their actions on the opinion of others. The second part is the self-authorized mind, this mindset breaks loose of others thoughts and makes their own decisions. The last part in this theory is the self-transforming mind. This mindset listens to the thoughts and opinions of others, yet still is able to choose and make the decision for themselves. Less than 1 percent of people are in the self-transforming mindset. For the socialized mind, 60 percent of people are in this mindset well into their adult years. Role theory is following perceived roles and standards that people in society normalize. People are confined to roles that have been placed around them due to the socialized mind. The internalization of the value of others in society leads to role theory.

A key insight of this theory is that role conflict occurs when a person is expected to simultaneously act out multiple roles that carry contradictory expectations. They are pulled in different ways as they strive to hold various types of societal standards and statuses.

== Role ==
Substantial debate exists in the field over the meaning of the role in role theory. A role can be defined as a social position, behavior associated with a social position, or a typical behavior. Some theorists have put forward the idea that roles are essentially expectations about how an individual ought to behave in a given situation, whereas others consider it means how individuals actually behave in a given social position. Some have suggested that a role is a characteristic behavior or expected behavior, a part to be played, or a script for social conduct.

In sociology, there are different categories of social roles:

1. cultural roles: roles given by culture (e.g. priest)
2. social differentiation: e.g. teacher, taxi driver
3. situation-specific roles: e.g. eye witness
4. bio-sociological roles: e.g. as human in a natural system
5. gender roles: as a man, woman, mother, father, etc.

Role theory models behavior as patterns of behaviors to which one can conform, with this conformity being based on the expectations of others. (Note: See section "Conformity connotes compliance to some pattern for behavior")

It has been argued that a role must in some sense being defined in relation to others. (Note: "The role cannot be limited to one person's behaviour, but must include the behaviour of others which provide the rights enabling those actions") The manner and degree is debated by sociologists. Turner used the concept of an "other-role", arguing the process of defining a role is negotiating one's role with other-roles. (Note: "The idea of role-taking shift emphasis away from the simple process of enacting a prescribed role to devising a performance on the basis of an imputer other-role")

=== The construction of roles ===
Turner argued that the process of describing a role also modifies the role which would otherwise be implicit, referring to this process as role-making arguing that very formal roles such as those in the military are not representative of roles because the role-making process is suppressed. (Note: "The result is that in attempting from time to time to make aspects of the roles explicit he is creating and modifying roles as well as merely bringing them to light; the process is not only role-taking but role-making.") Sociologist Howard S. Becker similarly claims that the label given and the definition used in a social context can change actions and behaviors.

Situation-specific roles develop ad hoc in a given social situation. However it can be argued that the expectations and norms that define this ad hoc role are defined by the social role.

The word consensus is used when a group of people have the same expectations through agreement. We live in a society where people know how they should act, which is a result of learned behaviors stemming from social norms. As a whole society follows typical roles and follows their expected norms. Subsequently, there is a standard created through the conformity of these social groups.

== The relationship between roles and norms ==
Some theorists view behavior as being enforced by social norms. Turner rather argues that there is a norm of consistency that failing to conform to a role breaks a norm because it violates consistency.

=== Cultural roles ===
Cultural roles are seen as a matter of course, and are mostly stable. In cultural changes new roles can develop and old roles can disappear – these cultural changes are affected by political and social conflicts. For example, the feminist movement initiated a change in male and female roles in Western societies. The roles, or the exact duties of men more specifically are being questioned. With more women going further in school than men comes more financial and occupational benefits. Unfortunately, these benefits have not been shown to increase women's happiness.

=== Social differentiation ===
Social differentiation received a lot of attention due to the development of different job roles. Robert K. Merton distinguished between intrapersonal and interpersonal role conflicts. For example, a foreman has to develop his own social role facing the expectations of his team members and his supervisor – this is an interpersonal role conflict. He also has to arrange his different social roles as father, husband, club member – this is an intrapersonal role conflict.

Ralph Dahrendorf distinguished between must-expectations, with sanctions; shall-expectations, with sanctions and rewards and can-expectations, with rewards. The foreman has to avoid corruption; he should satisfy his reference groups (e.g. team members and supervisors); and he can be sympathetic. He argues another component of role theory is that people accept their own roles in the society and it is not the society that imposes them.

=== Role behavior ===
In their life people have to face different social roles, sometimes they have to face different roles at the same time in different social situations. There is an evolution of social roles: some disappear and some new develop. Role behavior is influenced by:

1. The norms that determine a social situation.
2. Internal and external expectations are connected to a social role.
3. Social sanctions (punishment and reward) are used to influence role behavior.

These three aspects are used to evaluate one's own behavior as well as the behavior of other people. Heinrich Popitz defines social roles as norms of behavior that a special social group has to follow. Norms of behavior are a set of behaviors that have become typical among group members; in case of deviance, negative sanctions follow.

=== Gender roles ===
Gender has played a crucial role in our societal norms and the distinction between how female and male roles are viewed in society. Specifically within the workplace, and in the home. Historically there was a division of roles created by society due to gender. Gender was a social difference between female and male; whereas sex was nature. Gender became a way to categorize men and women and divide them into their societal roles. Although gender is important there are many different ways that women are categorized in society. Other ways are racially and through class experience. While we have societal roles from gender, there will always be a separation between females and males.

With the advancement of times, with jobs and the industry moving away from strength and labor, women have advanced their education for employment. The sex segregation between women and men has decreased as time has matured and evolved away from traditional gender roles in society.

== In public relations ==
Role theory is a perspective that considers everyday activity to be acting out socially defined categories. Split into two narrower definitions: status is one's position within a social system or group; and role is one's pattern of behavior associated with a status.

Organizational role is defined as "recurring actions of an individual, appropriately interrelated with the repetitive activities of others so as to yield a predictable outcome." (Katz & Kahn, 1978). Within an organization there are three main topologies:

1. Two-role typology:
  1. Manager
  2. Technician
2. Four-role typology:
  1. Expert prescriber
  2. Communication facilitator
  3. Problem-Solving Process Facilitator
  4. Communication technician
3. Five-role typology:
  1. Monitor and evaluator
  2. Key policy and strategic advisor
  3. Troubleshooter/problem solver
  4. Issues management expert
  5. Communication technician

== Role conflict, strain, or making ==
Despite variations in the terms used, the central component of all of the formulations is incompatibility.

Role conflict is a conflict among the roles corresponding to two or more statuses, for example, teenagers who have to deal with pregnancy (statuses: teenager, mother). Role conflict is said to exist when there are important differences among the ratings given for various expectations. By comparing the extent of agreement or disagreement among the ranks, a measure of role conflict was obtained.

Role strain or "role pressure" may arise when there is a conflict in the demands of roles, when an individual does not agree with the assessment of others concerning his or her performance in his or her role, or from accepting roles that are beyond an individual's capacity.

Role making is defined by Graen as leader–member exchange.

At the same time, a person may have limited power to negotiate away from accepting roles that cause strain, because he or she is constrained by societal norms, or has limited social status from which to bargain.

== Criticism and limitations ==
Role theorists have noted that a weakness of role theory is in describing and explaining deviant behavior.

Role theory has been criticized for reinforcing commonly held prejudices about how people should behave; (Note: "First, critics claim that role theory falsely reifies certain social ideologies into concrete realities or objective templates, and names them roles." The example of "motherhood" is discussed.) have ways they should portray themselves as well as how others should behave, view the individual as responsible for fulfilling the expectations of a role rather than others responsible for creating a role that they can perform, (Note: "When using role conflict to analyze deviant behavior, role theorists rely on explanations of insufficient socialization or a mismatch between one's personality and behavioral expectations as the primary reasons an individual does not engage in proper behavior") and people have argued that role theory insufficiently explains power relations, as in some situations an individual does not consensually fulfill a role but is forced into behaviors by power. (Note: gives the example of coercion rather than willingly performing a role effecting behaviour: "In these cases, internalized behavior resulting from a consensual socialization process does not necessarily account for the individuals' actions") It is also argued that role theory does not explain individual agency in negotiating their role (Note: "Fourth, role theory fails to provide an authentic account of human agency, more specifically, the subjective experience of an individual's engagement in occupation") and that role theory artificially merges roles when in practice an individual might combine roles together. (Note: "Bracketing occupation into various roles provides the illusion that life is partitioned into isolated segments which can be dealt with independently.")

Others have argued that the concept of role takes on such a broad definition as to be meaningless. (Note: "The charge has been made that referents for the term 'role' are so heterogeneous as to defy rigorous study and coherent theory formation")

== See also ==
- Behaviorism
- Conformity
- Deviance (sociology)
- Dramaturgical perspective
- Evolutionary neuroandrogenic theory
- Game studies
- Generalized other
- Hedonism
- Role engulfment
- Role model
- Role suction
- Social theory
- Transactional analysis

== Bibliography ==
- Becker, Howard S. (2018). Outsiders: studies in the sociology of deviance (New ed.). New York, NY: Free Press. pp. 169–172. ISBN 978-1-9821-0622-5. OCLC 1033904462.
- Mead, George H. (1934). Mind, Self, and Society. Chicago: University of Chicago Press.
- Parsons, Talcott (1951). The Social System.
- Robert K. Merton, Social Theory and Social Structure, 1949
- Ralf Dahrendorf, Homo sociologicus, 1958 (in German, many editions)
- Rose Laub Coser, "The Complexity of Roles as a Seedbed of Individual Autonomy", in: The Idea of Social Structure: Papers in Honor of Robert K. Merton, 1975
- Ralph Linton, The Study of Man, Chapter 8, "Status and Role", 1936
