= Status–income disequilibrium =

Status–income disequilibrium (sometimes abbreviated SID) occurs when a desirable high status job has a relatively low income. It is a variation on the sociological term status inconsistency. The phrase was coined by The New York Times columnist David Brooks in his 1996 article "The Tragedy of SID". He wrote:

The sufferers of this malady, have jobs that give them high status but low income. They lunch on an expense account at The Palm, but dine at home on macaroni. All day long the phone-message slips pile up on their desks—calls from famous people seeking favors—but at night they realize the tub needs scrubbing, so it's down on the hands and knees with the Ajax. At work they are aristocrats, Kings of the Meritocracy, schmoozing with Felix Rohatyn. At home they are peasants, wondering if they can really afford to have orange juice every morning.

David Brooks characterized the "sufferers" from SID in a long list, which includes TV news producers, museum curators, classical music performers, White House aides, and politicians, among others. Other journalists applied the term to "authors and academics", journalists, writers, "British middle classes", and even to the British MPs.
