= Racial hierarchy =

Hierarchy based on the belief that certain races are inherently superior and inferior

A racial hierarchy is a system of stratification that is based on the pseudoscientific belief that some racial groups are superior to other racial groups. At various points of history, racial hierarchies have featured in societies, often being formally instituted in law, such as in the Nuremberg Laws in Nazi Germany. Generally, those who support racial hierarchies believe themselves to be part of the putative 'superior' race and base their supposed superiority on pseudo-biological, cultural or religious arguments. However, systems of racial hierarchy have also been widely rejected and challenged, and many, such as Apartheid have been abolished. The abolition of such systems has not stopped debate around racial hierarchy and racism more broadly.

== Liberia ==
Liberia confers nationality solely on the basis of race. Under the current Liberian constitution, only persons of Black African origins (Negroes) may obtain citizenship, although Liberian law allows members of other races to hold permanent residency status.

Features of the first constitution that have been upheld include:

- Article V, Section 13 of the 1847 Constitution which states: "The great object of forming these Colonies, being to provide a home for the dispersed and oppressed children of Africa, and to regenerate and enlighten this benighted continent, none but persons of colour shall be eligible to citizenship in this Republic." The phrasing "persons of colour" was changed to "Negroes or persons of Negro descent" in a 1955 revision.

== United States ==
=== Slavery ===
From the founding of the United States until after the Civil War, racial hierarchy was visible through the racially-based Slavery in the United States which had taken root before American independence. Though many abolitionists had campaigned for slavery to be ended, there was much resistance from those who benefitted economically, as well as those who believed it was 'natural' for racially based reasons-these two groups were not mutually exclusive. In order to maintain and defend slavery, pro-slavery writers organized a "planter liberalism" by combining paternalist and liberal views into an ideology that could be understood by both slave-holding and non-slave-holding citizens. Their ideology was based on familiar domestic relationships. These views later paved the way for white Southern planters to keep racial conditions as close to slavery as legally possible after the Civil War during the Reconstruction era.

The Thirteenth Amendment, which abolished legal slavery in 1865, did not remove institutionalised racial hierarchy. In the southern states which had retained slavery until the end of the Civil War, states quickly moved to subjugate the freed slaves by introducing Black Codes, which were used to compel blacks to work for low wages and to control other aspects of their lives. Intellectual and civil rights activist W.E.B. Du Bois wrote in 1935:

Slavery was not abolished even after the Thirteenth Amendment. There were four million freedmen and most of them on the same plantation, doing the same work they did before emancipation, except as their work had been interrupted and changed by the upheaval of war....They had been freed practically with no land nor money, and, save in exceptional cases, without legal status, and without protection'

As policies in the United States changed after the Reconstruction period, elements within the white population tried to continue their domination of the races they deemed inferior. Laws enacted after the 1880s prevented certain groups like Southern planters from continuing to affirm their mastery as black and white people became more legally equal. Southern Darwinian liberals wanted to provide little civil and political rights to blacks as a part of their mission to maintain white supremacy.

=== Segregation ===
Racial segregation, mandated by the Jim Crow laws, was a visible aspect of racial hierarchy in the United States until 1965. The system was justified by the concept of separate but equal from 1896, but was found to be unconstitutional by a series of Supreme Court rulings under Chief Justice Warren, beginning with Brown vs Board of Education in 1954, which found that 'separate is not equal' in the realm of educational facilities.

=== Racial inequality ===
In a study conducted by the Urban Institute, "black homebuyers encountered discrimination in 22 percent of their searches for rental units and 17 percent in their efforts to purchase homes. For Hispanics, the figures were 26 and 20 percent." African Americans and Hispanic people receive "inferior health care" compared to Caucasians when dealing with major health problems. A study conducted in 1995, showed that the infant mortality rate was higher for black babies than it was for white babies. The black rate was 14.3 for every 1000 babies as opposed to the 6.3 for every 1000 white babies. Some research has shown that it is easier for white people to find employment than black people despite the white person having a felony conviction.
