= Social stratification =

Concept in sociology

Social stratification refers to a society's hierarchical categorization of its people into groups based on socioeconomic factors such as wealth, income, race, education, ethnicity, gender, occupation, social status, or derived power (social and political). It is a hierarchy within groups that ascribe them to different levels of privileges. As such, stratification is the relative social position of persons within a social group, category, geographic region, or social unit. The concept of social stratification (as well as the concept of social mobility) was introduced by a Russian-American sociologist Pitirim Sorokin in his book "Social Mobility" published in 1927.

In modern Western societies, social stratification is defined in terms of three social classes: an upper class, a middle class, and a working class; in turn, each class can be subdivided into an upper-stratum, a middle-stratum, and a lower stratum. Moreover, a social stratum can be formed upon the bases of kinship, clan, tribe, or caste, or all four.

The categorization of people by social stratum occurs most clearly in complex state-based, polycentric, or feudal societies, the latter being based upon socio-economic relations among classes of nobility and classes of peasants. Whether social stratification first appeared in hunter-gatherer, tribal, and band societies or whether it began with agriculture and large-scale means of social exchange remains a matter of debate in the social sciences. The structures of social stratification arise from inequalities of status among persons; therefore, the degree of social inequality determines a person's social stratum. Generally, the greater the social complexity of a society, the more social stratification exists, by way of social differentiation.

== Overview ==
=== Definition and usage ===
"Social stratification" is a concept used in the social sciences to describe the relative social position of persons in a given social group, category, geographical region or other social unit. It derives from the Latin strātum (plural 'strata'; parallel, horizontal layers) referring to a given society's categorization of its people into rankings of socioeconomic tiers based on factors like wealth, income, social status, occupation and power. In modern Western societies, stratification is often broadly classified into three major divisions of social class: upper class, middle class, and working class. Each of these classes can be further subdivided into smaller classes (e.g. "upper middle"). Social strata may also be delineated on the basis of kinship ties or caste relations.

The concept of social stratification is often used and interpreted differently within specific theories. In sociology, for example, proponents of action theory have suggested that social stratification is commonly found in developed societies, wherein a dominance hierarchy may be necessary in order to maintain social order and provide a stable social structure. Conflict theories, such as Marxism, point to the inaccessibility of resources and lack of social mobility found in stratified societies. Many sociological theorists have criticized the fact that the working classes are often unlikely to advance socioeconomically while the wealthy tend to hold political power which they use to exploit the proletariat (laboring class). Talcott Parsons, an American sociologist, asserted that stability and social order are regulated, in part, by universal values. Such values are not identical with "consensus" but can indeed be an impetus for social conflict, as has been the case multiple times through history. Parsons never claimed that universal values, in and by themselves, "satisfied" the functional prerequisites of a society. Indeed, the constitution of society represents a much more complicated codification of emerging historical factors. Theorists such as Ralf Dahrendorf alternately note the tendency toward an enlarged middle-class in modern Western societies due to the necessity of an educated workforce in technological economies. Various social and political perspectives concerning globalization, such as dependency theory, suggest that these effects are due to changes in the status of workers to the third world.

=== Four underlying principles ===
Four principles are posited to underlie social stratification. First, social stratification is socially defined as a property of a society rather than individuals in that society. Second, social stratification is reproduced from generation to generation. Third, social stratification is universal (found in every society) but variable (differs across time and place). Fourth, social stratification involves not just quantitative inequality but qualitative beliefs and attitudes about social status.

=== Complexity ===
Although stratification is not limited to complex societies, all complex societies exhibit features of stratification. In any complex society, the total stock of valued goods is distributed unequally, wherein the most privileged individuals and families enjoy a disproportionate share of income, power, and other valued social resources. The term "stratification system" is sometimes used to refer to the complex social relationships and social structures that generate these observed inequalities. The key components of such systems are: (a) social-institutional processes that define certain types of goods as valuable and desirable, (b) the rules of allocation that distribute goods and resources across various positions in the division of labor (e.g., physician, farmer, 'housewife'), and (c) the social mobility processes that link individuals to positions and thereby generate unequal control over valued resources.

=== Social mobility ===
Social connectedness to people of higher income levels is a strong predictor of upward income mobility. However, data shows substantial social segregation correlating with economic income groups.

Social mobility is the movement of individuals, social groups or categories of people between the layers or within a stratification system. This movement can be intragenerational or intergenerational. Such mobility is sometimes used to classify different systems of social stratification. Open stratification systems are those that allow for mobility between, typically by placing value on the achieved status characteristics of individuals. Those societies having the highest levels of intragenerational mobility are considered to be the most open and malleable systems of stratification. Those systems in which there is little to no mobility, even on an intergenerational basis, are considered closed stratification systems. For example, in caste systems, all aspects of social status are ascribed, such that one's social position at birth persists throughout one's lifetime.

==== Karl Marx ====
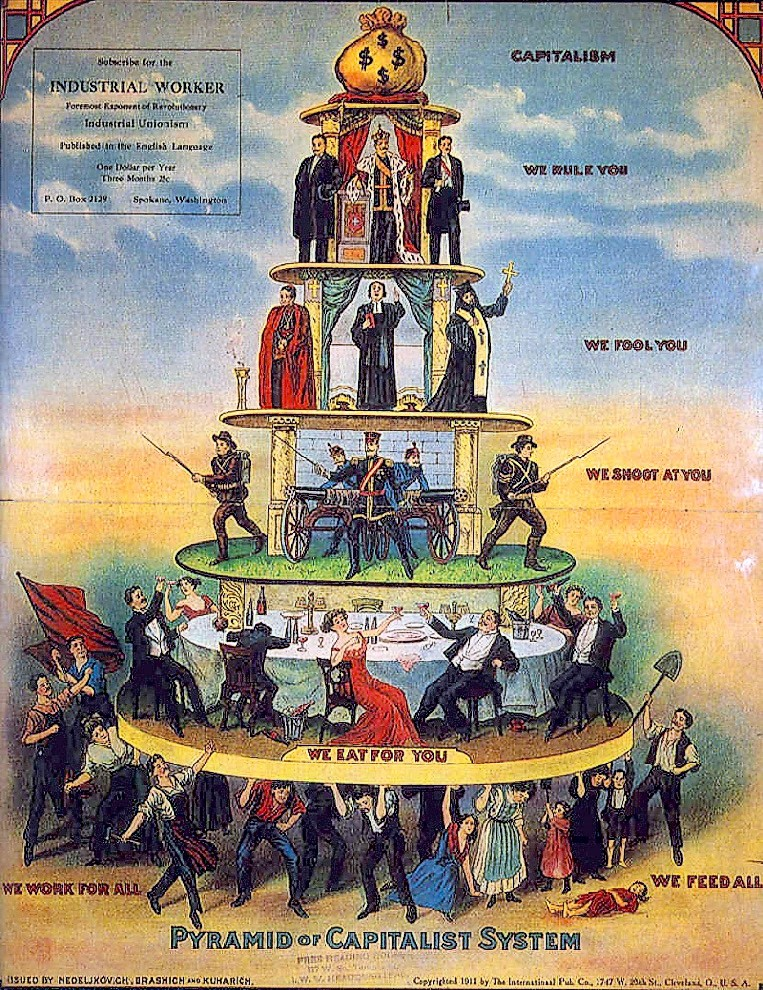
The 1911 "Pyramid of Capitalist System" cartoon is an example of socialist critique of capitalism and of social stratification.

In Marxist theory, the modern mode of production consists of two main economic parts: the base and the superstructure. The base encompasses the relations of production: employer–employee work conditions, the technical division of labour, and property relations. Social class, according to Marx, is determined by one's relationship to the means of production. There exist at least two classes in any class-based society: the owners of the means of production and those who have to sell their labor to the owners of the means of production. At times, Marx almost hints that the ruling classes seem to own the working class itself as they only have their own labor power ('wage labor') to offer the more powerful in order to survive. These relations fundamentally determine the ideas and philosophies of a society and additional classes may form as part of the superstructure. Through the ideology of the ruling class—throughout much of history, the land-owning aristocracy—false consciousness is promoted both through political and non-political institutions but also through the arts and other elements of culture. When the aristocracy falls, the bourgeoisie become the owners of the means of production in the capitalist system. Marx predicted the capitalist mode would eventually give way, through its own internal conflict, to revolutionary consciousness and the development of more egalitarian, more communist societies.

Marx also described two other classes, the petite bourgeoisie and the lumpenproletariat. The petite bourgeoisie is like a small business class that never really accumulates enough profit to become part of the bourgeoisie, or even challenge their status. The lumpenproletariat is the underclass, those with little to no social status. This includes prostitutes, street gangs, beggars, the homeless or other untouchables in a given society. Neither of these subclasses has much influence in Marx's two major classes, but it is helpful to know that Marx did recognize differences within the classes.

According to Marvin Harris and Tim Ingold, Lewis Henry Morgan's accounts of egalitarian hunter-gatherers formed part of Karl Marx' and Friedrich Engels' inspiration for communism. Morgan spoke of a situation in which people living in the same community pooled their efforts and shared the rewards of those efforts fairly equally. He called this "communism in living". But when Marx expanded on these ideas, he still emphasized an economically oriented culture, with property defining the fundamental relationships between people. Yet, issues of ownership and property are arguably less emphasized in hunter-gatherer societies. This, combined with the very different social and economic situations of hunter-gatherers may account for many of the difficulties encountered when implementing communism in industrialized states. As Ingold points out: "The notion of communism, removed from the context of domesticity and harnessed to support a project of social engineering for large-scale, industrialized states with populations of millions, eventually came to mean something quite different from what Morgan had intended: namely, a principle of redistribution that would override all ties of a personal or familial nature, and cancel out their effects."

The counter-argument to Marxist's conflict theory is the theory of structural functionalism, argued by Kingsley Davis and Wilbert Moore, which states that social inequality places a vital role in the smooth operation of a society. The Davis–Moore hypothesis argues that a position does not bring power and prestige because it draws a high income; rather, it draws a high income because it is functionally important and the available personnel is for one reason or another scarce. Most high-income jobs are difficult and require a high level of education to perform, and their compensation is a motivator in society for people to strive to achieve more.

==== Max Weber ====
Max Weber was strongly influenced by Marx's ideas but rejected the possibility of effective communism, arguing that it would require an even greater level of detrimental social control and bureaucratization than capitalist society. Moreover, Weber criticized the dialectical presumption of a proletariat revolt, maintaining it to be unlikely. Instead, he develops a three-component theory of stratification and the concept of life chances. Weber held there are more class divisions than Marx suggested, taking different concepts from both functionalist and Marxist theories to create his own system. He emphasizes the difference between class, status, and party, and treats these as separate but related sources of power, each with different effects on social action. Working half a century later than Marx, Weber claims there to be four main social classes: the upper class, the white collar workers, the petite bourgeoisie, and the manual working class.

Weber derives many of his key concepts on social stratification by examining the social structure of Germany. He notes that, contrary to Marx's theories, stratification is based on more than simple ownership of capital. Weber examines how many members of the aristocracy lacked economic wealth yet had strong political power. Many wealthy families lacked prestige and power, for example, because they were Jewish. Weber introduced three independent factors that form his theory of stratification hierarchy, which are; class, status, and power:

- Class: A person's economic position in a society, based on birth and individual achievement. Weber differs from Marx in that he does not see this as the supreme factor in stratification. Weber notes how corporate executives control firms they typically do not own; Marx would have placed these people in the proletariat despite their high incomes by virtue of the fact they sell their labor instead of owning capital.
- Status: A person's prestige, social honor, or popularity in a society. Weber notes that political power is not rooted in capital value solely, but also in one's individual status. Poets or saints, for example, can have extensive influence on society despite few material resources.
- Power: A person's ability to get their way despite the resistance of others, particularly in their ability to engage social change. For example, individuals in government jobs, such as an employee of the Federal Bureau of Investigation, or a member of the United States Congress, may hold little property or status but still wield considerable social power.

==== C. Wright Mills ====
C. Wright Mills, drawing from the theories of Vilfredo Pareto and Gaetano Mosca, contends that the imbalance of power in society derives from the complete absence of countervailing powers against corporate leaders of the power elite. Mills both incorporated and revised Marxist ideas. While he shared Marx's recognition of a dominant wealthy and powerful class, Mills believed that the source for that power lay not only in the economic realm but also in the political and military arenas. During the 1950s, Mills stated that hardly anyone knew about the power elite's existence, some individuals (including the elite themselves) denied the idea of such a group, and other people vaguely believed that a small formation of a powerful elite existed. "Some prominent individuals knew that Congress had permitted a handful of political leaders to make critical decisions about peace and war; and that two atomic bombs had been dropped on Japan in the name of the United States, but neither they nor anyone they knew had been consulted."

Mills explains that the power elite embody a privileged class whose members are able to recognize their high position within society. In order to maintain their highly exalted position within society, members of the power elite tend to marry one another, understand and accept one another, and also work together.^{[pp. 4–5]} The most crucial aspect of the power elite's existence lays within the core of education. "Youthful upper-class members attend prominent preparatory schools, which not only open doors to such elite universities as Harvard, Yale, and Princeton but also to the universities' highly exclusive clubs. These memberships in turn pave the way to the prominent social clubs located in all major cities and serving as sites for important business contacts."^{[pp. 63–67]} Examples of elite members who attended prestigious universities and were members of highly exclusive clubs can be seen in George W. Bush and John Kerry. Both Bush and Kerry were members of the Skull and Bones club while attending Yale University. This club includes members of some of the most powerful men of the twentieth century, all of which are forbidden to tell others about the secrets of their exclusive club. Throughout the years, the Skull and Bones club has included presidents, cabinet officers, Supreme Court justices, spies, captains of industry, and often their sons and daughters join the exclusive club, creating a social and political network like none ever seen before.

The upper class individuals who receive elite educations typically have the essential background and contacts to enter into the three branches of the power elite: The political leadership, the military circle, and the corporate elite.

- The Political Leadership: Mills held that, prior to the end of World War II, leaders of corporations became more prominent within the political sphere along with a decline in central decision-making among professional politicians.
- The Military Circle: During the 1950s–1960s, increasing concerns about warfare resulted in top military leaders and issues involving defense funding and military personnel training becoming a top priority within the United States. Most of the prominent politicians and corporate leaders have been strong proponents of military spending.
- The Corporate Elite: Mills explains that during the 1950s, when the military emphasis was recognized, corporate leaders worked with prominent military officers who dominated the development of policies. Corporate leaders and high-ranking military officers were mutually supportive of each other.^{[pp. 274–276]}

Mills shows that the power elite has an "inner-core" made up of individuals who are able to move from one position of institutional power to another; for example, a prominent military officer who becomes a political adviser or a powerful politician who becomes a corporate executive. "These people have more knowledge and a greater breadth of interests than their colleagues. Prominent bankers and financiers, who Mills considered 'almost professional go-betweens of economic, political, and military affairs,' are also members of the elite's inner core.^{[pp. 288–289]}

=== Anthropological theories ===
Most if not all anthropologists dispute the "universal" nature of social stratification, holding that it is not the standard among all societies. John Gowdy (2006) writes, "Assumptions about human behaviour that members of market societies believe to be universal, that humans are naturally competitive and acquisitive, and that social stratification is natural, do not apply to many hunter-gatherer peoples. Non-stratified egalitarian or acephalous ("headless") societies exist which have little or no concept of social hierarchy, political or economic status, class, or even permanent leadership."

=== Kinship-orientation ===
Anthropologists identify egalitarian cultures as "kinship-oriented", because they appear to value social harmony more than wealth or status. These cultures are contrasted with economically oriented cultures (including states) in which status and material wealth are prized, and stratification, competition, and conflict are common. Kinship-oriented cultures actively work to prevent social hierarchies from developing because they believe that such stratification could lead to conflict and instability. Reciprocal altruism is one process by which this is accomplished.

A good example is given by Richard Borshay Lee in his account of the Khoisan, who practice "insulting the meat". Whenever a hunter makes a kill, he is ceaselessly teased and ridiculed (in a friendly, joking fashion) to prevent him from becoming too proud or egotistical. The meat itself is then distributed evenly among the entire social group, rather than kept by the hunter. The level of teasing is proportional to the size of the kill. Lee found this out when he purchased an entire cow as a gift for the group he was living with, and was teased for weeks afterward about it (since obtaining that much meat could be interpreted as showing off).

Another example is the Australian Aboriginals of Groote Eylandt and Bickerton Island, off the coast of Arnhem Land, who have arranged their entire society—spiritually and economically—around a kind of gift economy called renunciation. According to David H. Turner, in this arrangement, every person is expected to give everything of any resource they have to any other person who needs or lacks it at the time. This has the benefit of largely eliminating social problems like theft and relative poverty. However, misunderstandings obviously arise when attempting to reconcile Aboriginal renunciative economics with the competition/scarcity-oriented economics introduced to Australia by European colonists.

== Variables in theory and research ==
The social status variables underlying social stratification are based in social perceptions and attitudes about various characteristics of persons and peoples. While many such variables cut across time and place, the relative weight placed on each variable and specific combinations of these variables will differ from place to place over time. One task of research is to identify accurate mathematical models that explain how these many variables combine to produce stratification in a given society. Grusky (2011) provides a good overview of the historical development of sociological theories of social stratification and a summary of contemporary theories and research in this field. While many of the variables that contribute to an understanding of social stratification have long been identified, models of these variables and their role in constituting social stratification are still an active topic of theory and research. In general, sociologists recognize that there are no "pure" economic variables, as social factors are integral to economic value. However, the variables posited to affect social stratification can be loosely divided into economic and other social factors.

=== Economic ===
Strictly quantitative economic variables are more useful to describing social stratification than explaining how social stratification is constituted or maintained. Income is the most common variable used to describe stratification and associated economic inequality in a society. However, the distribution of individual or household accumulation of surplus and wealth tells us more about variation in individual well-being than does income, alone. Wealth variables can also more vividly illustrate salient variations in the well-being of groups in stratified societies. Gross Domestic Product (GDP), especially per capita GDP, is sometimes used to describe economic inequality and stratification at the international or global level.

=== Social ===
Social variables, both quantitative and qualitative, typically provide the most explanatory power in causal research regarding social stratification, either as independent variables or as intervening variables. Three important social variables include gender, race, and ethnicity, which, at the least, have an intervening effect on social status and stratification in most places throughout the world. Additional variables include those that describe other ascribed and achieved characteristics such as occupation and skill levels, age, education level, education level of parents, and geographic area. Some of these variables may have both causal and intervening effects on social status and stratification. For example, absolute age may cause a low income if one is too young or too old to perform productive work. The social perception of age and its role in the workplace, which may lead to ageism, typically has an intervening effect on employment and income.

Social scientists are sometimes interested in quantifying the degree of economic stratification between different social categories, such as men and women, or workers with different levels of education. An index of stratification has been recently proposed by Zhou for this purpose.

==== Gender ====
Gender is one of the most pervasive and prevalent social characteristics which people use to make social distinctions between individuals. Gender distinctions are found in economic-, kinship- and caste-based stratification systems. Social role expectations often form along sex and gender lines. Entire societies may be classified by social scientists according to the rights and privileges afforded to men or women, especially those associated with ownership and inheritance of property. In patriarchal societies, such rights and privileges are normatively granted to men over women; in matriarchal societies, the opposite holds true. Sex- and gender-based division of labor is historically found in the annals of most societies and such divisions increased with the advent of industrialization. Sex-based wage discrimination exists in some societies such that men, typically, receive higher wages than women for the same type of work. Other differences in employment between men and women lead to an overall gender-based pay-gap in many societies, where women as a category earn less than men due to the types of jobs which women are offered and take, as well as to differences in the number of hours worked by women. These and other gender-related values affect the distribution of income, wealth, and property in a given social order.

==== Race ====
Racism consists of both prejudice and discrimination based in social perceptions of observable biological differences between peoples. It often takes the form of social actions, practices or beliefs, or political systems in which different races are perceived to be ranked as inherently superior or inferior to each other, based on presumed shared inheritable traits, abilities, or qualities. In a given society, those who share racial characteristics socially perceived as undesirable are typically under-represented in positions of social power, i.e., they become a minority category in that society. Minority members in such a society are often subjected to discriminatory actions resulting from majority policies, including assimilation, exclusion, oppression, expulsion, and extermination. Overt racism usually feeds directly into a stratification system through its effect on social status. For example, members associated with a particular race may be assigned a slave status, a form of oppression in which the majority refuses to grant basic rights to a minority that are granted to other members of the society. More covert racism, such as that which many scholars posit is practiced in more contemporary societies, is socially hidden and less easily detectable. Covert racism often feeds into stratification systems as an intervening variable affecting income, educational opportunities, and housing. Both overt and covert racism can take the form of structural inequality in a society in which racism has become institutionalized.

==== Ethnicity ====
Ethnic prejudice and discrimination operate much the same as do racial prejudice and discrimination in society. In fact, only recently have scholars begun to differentiate race and ethnicity; historically, the two were considered to be identical or closely related. With the scientific development of genetics and the human genome as fields of study, most scholars now recognize that race is socially defined on the basis of biologically determined characteristics that can be observed within a society while ethnicity is defined on the basis of culturally learned behavior. Ethnic identification can include shared cultural heritage such as language and dialect, symbolic systems, religion, mythology and cuisine. As with race, ethnic categories of persons may be socially defined as minority categories whose members are under-represented in positions of social power. As such, ethnic categories of persons can be subject to the same types of majority policies. Whether ethnicity feeds into a stratification system as a direct, causal factor or as an intervening variable may depend on the level of ethnographic centrism within each of the various ethnic populations in a society, the amount of conflict over scarce resources, and the relative social power held within each ethnic category.

=== Global stratification ===
Globalizing forces lead to rapid international integration arising from the interchange of world views, products, ideas, and other aspects of culture. Advances in transportation and telecommunications infrastructure, including the rise of the telegraph and its modern representation the Internet, are major factors in globalization, generating further interdependence of economic and cultural activities.

Like a stratified class system within a nation, looking at the world economy one can see class positions in the unequal distribution of capital and other resources between nations. Rather than having separate national economies, nations are considered as participating in this world economy. The world economy manifests a global division of labor with three overarching classes: core countries, semi-periphery countries and periphery countries, according to World-systems and Dependency theories. Core nations primarily own and control the major means of production in the world and perform the higher-level production tasks and provide international financial services. Periphery nations own very little of the world's means of production (even when factories are located in periphery nations) and provide low to non-skilled labor. Semiperipheral nations are midway between the core and periphery. They tend to be countries moving towards industrialization and more diversified economies.

Core nations receive the greatest share of surplus production, and periphery nations receive the least. Furthermore, core nations are usually able to purchase raw materials and other goods from noncore nations at low prices, while demanding higher prices for their exports to noncore nations. A global workforce employed through a system of global labor arbitrage ensures that companies in core countries can utilize the cheapest semi-and non-skilled labor for production.

Today we have the means to gather and analyze data from economies across the globe. Although many societies worldwide have made great strides toward more equality between differing geographic regions, in terms of the standard of living and life chances afforded to their peoples, we still find large gaps between the wealthiest and the poorest within a nation and between the wealthiest and poorest nations of the world. A January 2014 Oxfam report indicates that the 85 wealthiest individuals in the world have a combined wealth equal to that of the bottom 50% of the world's population, or about 3.5 billion people. By contrast, for 2012, the World Bank reports that 21 percent of people worldwide, around 1.5 billion, live in extreme poverty, at or below $1.25 a day. Zygmunt Bauman has provocatively observed that the rise of the rich is linked to their capacity to lead highly mobile lives: "Mobility climbs to the rank of the uppermost among coveted values—and the freedom to move, perpetually a scarce and unequally distributed commodity, fast becomes the main stratifying factor of our late modern or postmodern time."

=== Digital stratification and digital capital ===
In contemporary sociology, social stratification is increasingly analyzed through the lens of digital inequality. Moving beyond the concept of a simple "digital divide," research by scholars such as Massimo Ragnedda and Maria Laura Ruiu has integrated Pierre Bourdieu's theory of capital into the digital realm. This perspective introduces "digital capital" as a specific form of capital that consists of digital resources and skills. Digital capital acts as a bridge between social origin and the ability to convert online activities into social, economic, or cultural gains, thereby reinforcing existing social stratifications. This "third digital divide" focuses not only on access or skills but on the unequal life chances and outcomes produced by digital engagement.

== See also ==
- Age stratification – Hierarchical ranking of people into age groups
- Caste system – Social stratification conferring status
- Class stratification – Form of social categorization
- Cultural hegemony – Marxist theory of cultural dominance
- Dominance hierarchy – Type of socially subordinate ranking
- Egalitarianism – School of thought favoring equality for all people
- Elite theory – Theory of the state
- Elitism – Notion that elites deserve more influence
- Gini coefficient – Measure of inequality of a statistical distribution
- Globalization – Increasing worldwide interdependence
- Intersectionality – Theory of discrimination
- Marxism – Political philosophy
- Microinequity – Concept in anthropology
- Rankism – Rank-based discrimination
- Religious stratification – Division of a society into hierarchical layers on the basis of religion
- Social class – Hierarchical stratification of societies
- Social inequality
- Social justice – Concept in political philosophy
- Socioeconomic status – Economic and social measure of a person's affluence and/or influence
- Systems of social stratification
- The Power Elite – 1956 book by C. Wright Mills
