= Role set =

Role theory

According to Erving Goffman a role set is the various kinds of relevant audiences for a particular role. Robert K. Merton describes "role set" as the "complement of social relationships in which persons are involved because they occupy a particular social status." For instance, the role of a doctor has a role set comprising colleagues, nurses, patients, hospital administrators, etc.

The term "role set" was coined by Merton in 1957. He made a clear distinction between a "role set" and a "status set".

== See also ==
- Role conflict
- Role strain
