= Ranked society =

Society that ranks individuals by relation to chief

A ranked society in anthropology is one that ranks individuals in terms of their genealogical distance from the chief. Another term for a "ranked society" is a chiefdom. Closer relatives of the chief have higher rank or social status than more distant ones. Societies which follow this kind of structure associate rank with power, where other societies associate wealth with power. When individuals and groups rank about equally, competition for positions of leadership may occur. In some cases rank is assigned to entire villages rather than individuals or families. The idea of a ranked society was criticized by Max Weber and Karl Marx. Ranks in ranked society are the different levels, platforms, or social classes that determine someone’s influence on political aspects, votes, decision making, etc. A person’s ranking also gives them societal power (power within their civilisation).

== See also ==
- Rankism
- Social class
