= Status set =

Term in sociology

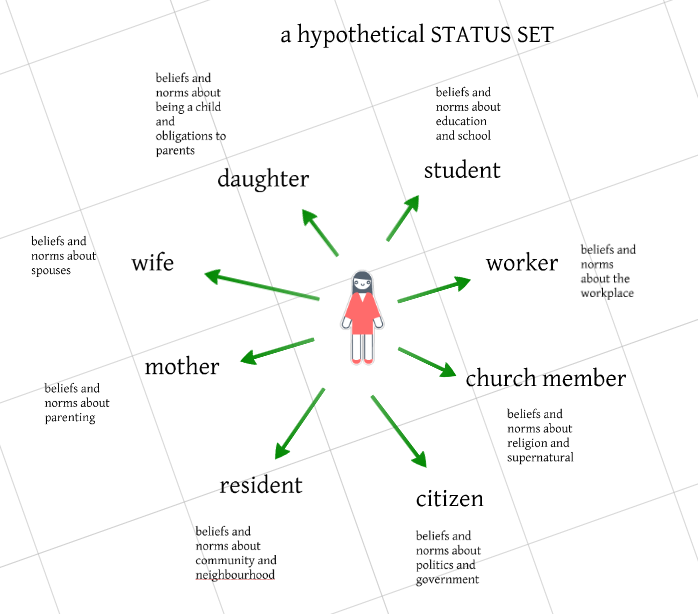
An example of a status set

A status set is a collection of social statuses that an individual holds. A person may have status of a daughter, wife, mother, student, worker, church member and a citizen.

The term "status set" was coined by Robert K. Merton in 1957. He made a clear distinction between a "role set" and a "status set".

Merton stated that status set is the set of statuses in a society while role set is the set of roles in a society

Status inconsistency is the situation where an individual's statuses have both positive and negative influences.
