= Master status =

Concept in sociology

In sociology, the master status is the social position that is the primary identifying characteristic of an individual. The term master status is defined as "a status that has exceptional importance for social identity, often shaping a person's entire life". In other words, a personal characteristic is a master status when that one characteristic overshadows or even redefines one's other personal characteristics and/or shapes a person's life course. For example a person who is a murderer may also be a kind, gentle, and honest person. But because 'murderer' is often a master status, many people assume all murderers are mean, violent, and dishonest. Being born a man as opposed to a woman shapes a person's entire life course - school, hobbies and sports, occupations, role within the family and at home, as well as roles taken in everyday social situations - all of these things are experienced very differently based upon sex. Master status can be ascribed or achieved.

Ascribed statuses are attributes one is born with – e.g., race, sex, etc. Achieved statuses are gained throughout life – e.g., mom, athlete, spouse, etc. When one of these statuses overpowers the others it can be determined as one's master status. An achieved status that becomes a master status is accompanied by a rite of passage, an important life event where a person is changed from one type of person into another. Marriage is one example, where a person transforms from single to spouse. Public criminal jury trials are another example, where a person transforms into the master status of "criminal".

== Origin ==
Everett Hughes first introduced the notion of master status in the 1940s, and it was the key subject of his address as the 53rd president of the American Sociological Association. In this address, he discussed "the tendency of observers to believe that one label or demographic category is more significant than any other aspect of the observed person's background, behavior or performance", with special reference to race. Everett Hughes presented the concept of Master Status in an article, “Dilemmas and Contradictions of Status” in the American Journal of Sociology. While his concept was influential, the term master status wasn't cited regularly until the 1970s. While it often perceives master status as negative, like race or gender discrimination, this isn't always the case (occupation status, for example).

== Description ==
The master status is often the most important architecture of individual identity. Common characteristics are those of race or ethnicity, gender, sexuality, physical ability, age, economic standing, religion or spirituality, and education. Others include raising children, employment status; and disability or mental illness.

In perception, an individual's master status supersedes other identifying traits; for example, if a woman feels that her role as a mother is more important than her role as a woman, a daughter, etc., she is more likely to identify herself as a mother and to identify with other women who label themselves as such. An individual's master status dominates how they are perceived by others and their behavior towards them. For example, if a woman feels that her role as a mother is relatively unimportant to her identity, it will still be a master status if she is living in a community or society that treats motherhood as a master status, because she will be treated by others primarily according to her characteristics as a mother. More than other aspects of the status set, the master status affects how the individual behaves and how others behave with respect to them. For example, conversation analysis shows that men tend to interrupt conversation much more than women. It also shows that men and women are on average treated differently when they interrupt: women are much more likely to be treated negatively for interrupting.

== Master status in society ==
Master status can be seen in everyday life (e.g., gendered bathrooms, handicapped signs, fame, occupation, etc.). These identities often control individual interactions. People may treat one differently depending on their master status. These examples are often social constructs that humans create to understand the world we live in.

=== Criminal courts' decision making based on master status ===
From data taken on about 370 different criminal court case decisions, studies have focused on the creation of a master status based on gang membership and the influence that has on charging and sentencing decisions. Various statuses such as “drug addict”, “mentally ill”, “child abuser”, “alcoholic”, and “ex-convict” have a big impact on decision-making. Statuses like these modify personal identity and limit alternatives and opportunities in the eyes of those in charge of sentencing. Stereotypes and master statuses can not be confused because while a stereotype indicates in this scenario that the observer is the one who filters any additional information about the case at hand, a master status heavily influences any final decisions made even when other information may be relevant. Over the years, gang and non-gang offenses have been carefully looked at because of this master status notion.

=== Effects of master status throughout history ===
==== Plessy vs. Ferguson ====
In this court case, race was evident as a master status, as the Supreme Court upheld racial segregation allowing advantages to white individuals. It occurred after African American Homer Plessy refused to sit in a car for blacks. The court ruled that a law that “implies merely a legal distinction” between color was "not unconstitutional”. This distinction is an example of a master status, in this case discrimination occurs due to ones master status.

==== Right to vote ====
Until 1920, women were prohibited from voting in elections. This exemplifies the master status of gender as it overpowered other aspects of a woman's identity. Allowing women to vote limited the power of this master status.

==== Sexual orientation ====
After Matthew Shepard was tortured and killed in a hate crime in 1998, many people picketed his funeral with signs saying "God Hates Fags" and "Matt in Hell". This exemplifies the power a pejorative master status can have: one characteristic – perceived as highly negative – overshadows and negates any positive characteristics a person has. These picketers are, by their words, claiming that his sexual orientation alone defined everything that he was. He was also very nice to everyone and even gifted at relating to people. He had a lot of friends. Had he lived to adulthood, he could have had a career where he helped a lot of people because of his talent connecting with others. To the picketers, however, only one thing about him mattered.
