= Evolutionary neuroandrogenic theory =

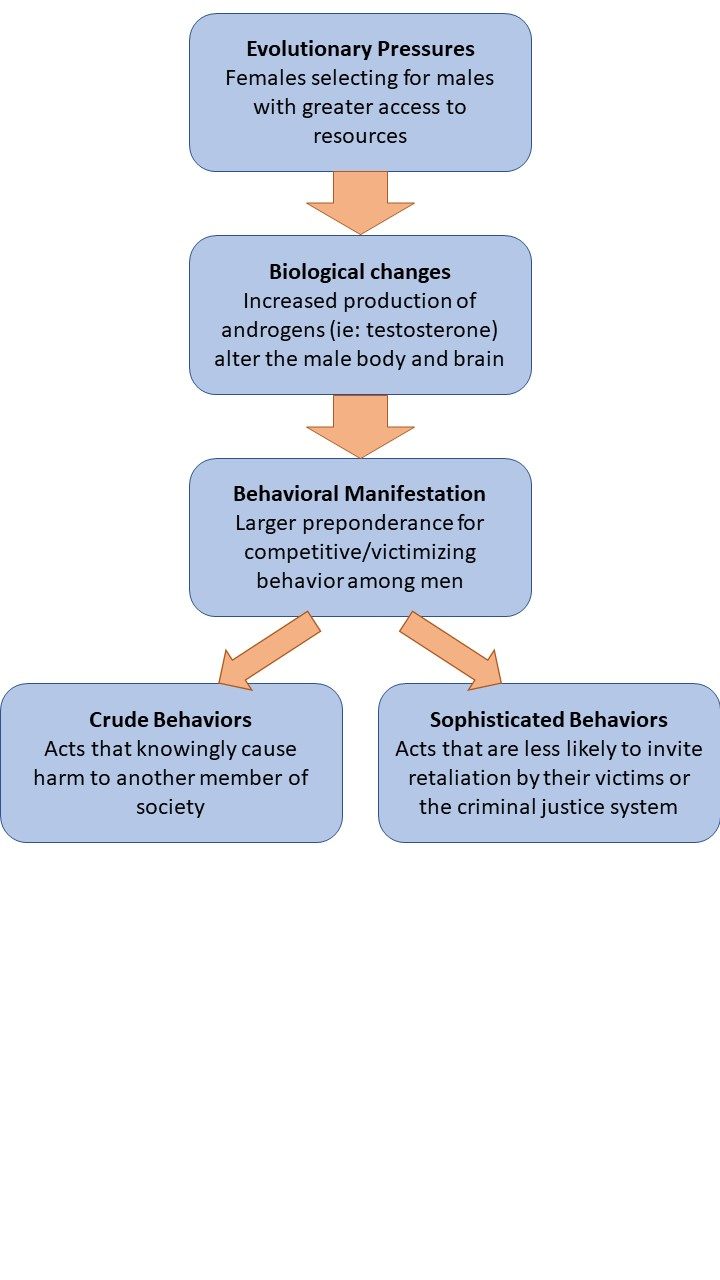
A basic outline of ENA theory showing how selective pressures can be mediated through biological changes in the male anatomy to produce competitive behaviors, which can then manifest as criminal behaviors.

The evolutionary neuroandrogenic (ENA) theory is a conceptual framework which seeks to explain trends in violent and criminal behavior from an evolutionary and biological perspective. It was first proposed by the sociologist Lee Ellis in 2005 in his paper "A Theory Explaining Biological Correlates of Criminality" published in the European Journal of Criminology. Since then, it has expanded into an interdisciplinary field that intersects biology, psychology, and sociology. The theory rests on two propositions. The first is that in human mating behavior, females prefer males that appear to be more competent providers of resources, and so males exhibit increased competitive behavior than females to obtain access to those resources. The second is that biological mechanisms (namely increased presence of androgens) lead to differential development in the male brain which then mediates the increased competitive behaviors that cause criminality. Though it was originally intended to explain high rates of criminality in young men, it has since been used as a framework to explain gang behavior, terrorism, and the rise of the criminal justice system.

Some have called into question the validity ENA theory, citing mixed literature on the effect of prenatal androgen exposure on later aggressive behavior.

== Background ==
Various sociological theories, such as the theory of differential association by Edwin Sutherland and the theory of anomie by Émile Durkheim, have sought to explain criminal behavior through the lens of socialization. However, such theories have been inadequate in explaining two trends: the rapid increase in criminality during puberty/young adulthood and the gender disparity in criminal behavior. In both cases, the trends are conserved between a variety of different societies, suggesting that these trends had a cause that was not culture-specific. Thus, researchers began looking for a biological explanation for such trends. During the 1980s, the modern field of evolutionary psychology took form with landmark studies such as David Buss' Sex differences in human mate preferences: Evolutionary hypotheses tested in 37 cultures. The scientific knowledge from developments in evolutionary psychology allowed Lee Ellis to formulate what is now known as the evolutionary neuroandrogenic theory.

== Overview ==
=== Sexual selection ===
First, ENA theory posits that women value the social position and resources of a prospective partner more so than men. Therefore, there is a large evolutionary incentive for men to compete and obtain the aforementioned social status and resources. Thus, males have evolved greater competitive behavior, which could manifest itself in criminality depending on the behavior's position on the crude–sophisticated scale.

=== Biological changes in males ===
Ellis hypothesized that the aforementioned selective pressures led to changes in the male brain that are mediated by a substantial increase in the presence of androgens (male sex hormones), particularly testosterone. During puberty, testosterone levels spike, producing three changes identified by ENA theory to play a crucial role in competitive behavior.

The first change is in lowering the sensitivity of the male brain to adverse environmental stimuli. This change has the dual role of decreasing sensitivity to pain and keeping the brain in a suboptimally aroused state. Thus, men will tend to seek more sensory stimulation while being more resistant to the pain that behavior might elicit. The second change caused by testosterone is alterations to the limbic system, increasing the likelihood of episodic dyscontrol, in which the person experiences a sudden, often violent negative outburst. Finally, Ellis believed that testosterone led to a change in the lateralization of the brain. That is, the left and right sides of the brain have been implicated in different mental processes, with the left functioning more in language and moral reasoning while the right functions more in calculation of risk and reward. Ellis suggests that testosterone shifted neocortical activity to the right hemisphere of the brain, thus decreasing moral reasoning in males.

=== Behavioral manifestation: the crude–sophisticated spectrum ===
Competitive behavior does not necessarily constitute criminal behavior. To distinguish those behaviors that are more likely to be criminal versus more benign behaviors, Ellis proposed the crude–sophisticated spectrum. Crude behaviors are those that are obviously and purposefully harmful (e.g.: rape, murder, etc.) while sophisticated behaviors are those that still compete for status or resources but are generally considered acceptable by society (e.g.: competing for a promotion or political position). Many behaviors lie between those two extremes. For example, white-collar crimes (embezzlement, fraud) do not cause physical harm to people but are also not accepted by society.

During the onset of puberty and on through early adulthood in males, males experience a sudden inclination for competitive behavior but have not yet learned how to manifest it in an acceptable way. Therefore, competitive behavior at this age range tends to be more crude, explaining the disproportionate amount of criminality among young men. However, as men age, the gradually learn more socially accepted behavior and so their behavior transitions from crude to sophisticated. Ellis predicts that this means that higher intelligence people go through this transition faster and so will exhibit less criminality than less intelligent people.

== Evidence ==
=== Evolutionary pressure and testosterone ===
Several lines of evidence point to females selecting for males with greater access to economic resources. Ellis points to a cross-cultural study of 37 different cultures which found that women universally preferred men with greater financial prospects more than men did. This trend is also reflected in the personality traits that women prefer, with women preferring ambitious and industrious men in 29 of the 37 cultures sampled. A study done on mate selection in a primitive Tanzanian hunter-gatherer society showed that those women valued men's foraging society, indicating that these women also valued their mate's access to resources. Evidence also shows that these preferences translate into actual mating behavior, with recent studies showing that women tend to date and marry men with higher incomes.

Various studies have found that salivary and blood testosterone levels are correlated with criminal behavior. One study on over 600 prisoner inmates found that salivary testosterone was higher in prison inmates who were convicted of more violent crimes and who violated more prison rules. In a 2014 study performed by Ellis, the 2D:4D ratio was used to indirectly measure fetal testosterone levels, which the researchers then used to correlate with criminality. The study found that increased fetal testosterone levels were moderately correlated with the likelihood of committing a variety of different types of crimes in both men and women.

=== Crude–sophisticated spectrum ===
ENA theory predicts that as males transition from adolescence to adulthood, they learn to manifest their competitive behavior in a more sophisticated fashion, thereby decreasing criminality. Therefore, ENA theory would predict that those who have a greater learning ability would be able to make the crude–sophisticated transition faster and will exhibit less criminal behavior. Ellis points to evidence that there is a moderate inverse correlation between IQ and the probability of offending. He further looks at research which shows that learning disabilities are directly correlated with juvenile delinquency. However, he notes that more research is required to understand the effects of different types of intelligence on criminality and that the existing research is largely correlational.

== Criticism ==
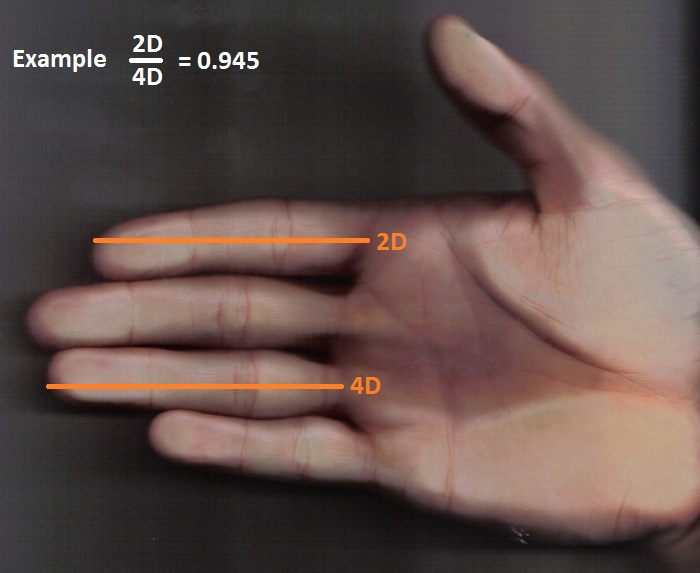
The 2D:4D digit ratio is a common method to estimate fetal testosterone exposure

One of the central pillars of ENA theory is that fetal testosterone levels cause permanent changes in male brains that lead to increased criminality later in life. However, while individual studies have provided strong results on the effect size of fetal testosterone on aggressive or violent behavior, meta-analyses have remained less conclusive. A 2017 meta-analysis of fetal testosterone levels found that fetal testosterone levels (measured by the 2D:4D digit ratio) had only a small effect size of 0.036 on aggressive or violent behavior. The authors further concluded that "the 2D:4D digit ratio is neither strongly nor reliably related to aggressive or violent behavior".

Other researchers have also pointed out the fact that the 2D:4D digit ratio, which is the method most often used to relate prenatal testosterone to future behaviors, is a rough and unreliable measure of prenatal testosterone. A 2012 analysis failed to replicate previous findings that a lower 2D:4D digit ratio correlates with increased androgen production. The authors of the analysis then hypothesized that androgens only have a slight effect on the 2D:4D digit ratio, and that variation in that ratio could arise from a number of other genetic or non-genetic sources.

Lee Ellis has responded to some of these criticisms in a 2018 commentary published in the journal Aggression and Violent Behavior. First, he agrees that the 2D:4D digit ratio is a crude measure of fetal testosterone levels, but that it is still a useful one. He then offers a few alternate methods of fetal testosterone measurement that could be used in future studies. Regarding the meta-analyses questioning the relationship between fetal testosterone levels and criminality, Ellis argued that the meta-analyses included traits that did not have known sex differences, therefore diluting the actual effect size of the relationship with traits that should not be related to fetal testosterone levels.

== See also ==
- Social role theory
