= Role =

Expected social behavioural norms

A role (also rôle or social role) is a set of connected behaviors, rights, obligations, beliefs, and norms as conceptualized by people in a social situation. It is an expected or free or continuously changing behavior and may have a given individual social status or social position. It is vital to both functionalist and interactionist understandings of society. Social role theory posits the following about social behavior:

1. The division of labour in society takes the form of the interaction among heterogeneous specialized positions, we call roles.
2. Social roles included appropriate and permitted forms of behavior and actions that recur in a group, guided by social norms, which are commonly known and hence determine the expectations for appropriate behavior in these roles, which further explains the position of a person in the society.
3. Roles are occupied by individuals, who are called actors.
4. When individuals approve of a social role (i.e., they consider the role legitimate and constructive), they will incur costs to conform to role norms, and will also incur costs to punish those who violate role norms.
5. Changed conditions can render a social role outdated or illegitimate, in which case social pressures are likely to lead to role change.
6. The anticipation of rewards and punishments, as well as the satisfaction of behaving pro-socially, account for why agents conform to role requirements.

The notion of the role can be and is examined in the social sciences, specifically economics, sociology and organizational theory.

== Definition ==
Stanley Wasserman and Katherine Faust cautioned that "there is considerable disagreement among social scientists about the definitions of the related concepts of social position, social status, and social role." They note that while many scholars differentiate those terms, they can define those terms in a way that clashes with the definitions of another scholar; for example they state that "[Ralph] Linton uses the term 'status' in a way that is identical to our use of the term 'position'".

== Determinants and characteristics ==
Roles may be achieved or ascribed or they can be accidental in different situations. An achieved role is a position that a person assumes voluntarily which reflects personal skills, abilities, and effort. An ascribed role is a position assigned to individuals or groups without regard for merit but because of certain traits beyond their control, and is usually forced upon a person.

Roles can be semi-permanent ("doctor", "mother", "child"), or they can be transitory. A well-known example is the sick role as formulated by Talcott Parsons in the late 1940s. In the transitory "sick role", a person is exempted from their usual roles, but is expected to conform to transitory behavioral standards, such as following doctors' orders and trying to recover.

For many roles, individuals must meet certain conditions, biological or sociological. For instance, a boy cannot ordinarily take the biological role of mother. Other roles require training or experience. For instance, in many cultures doctors must be educated and certified before practicing medicine.

Role development can be influenced by a number of additional factors, including social, genetic predisposition, cultural or situational.

- Societal influence: The structure of society often forms individuals into certain roles based on the social situations they choose to experience. Parents enrolling their children in certain programs at a young age increases the chance that the child will follow that role.
- Genetic predisposition: People take on roles that come naturally to them. Those with athletic ability generally take on roles of athletes. Those with mental genius often take on roles devoted to education and knowledge. This does not mean that people must choose only one path, each individual can reprise multiple roles (i.e. Evelyn can be the point guard on the basketball team and the editor of her school newspaper).
- Cultural influence: Different cultures place different values on certain roles based on their lifestyle. For instance, soccer players are regarded higher in European countries than in the United States, where soccer is less popular.
- Situational influence: Roles can be created or altered based on the situation a person is put in outside their own influence. An example of this is students blaming failure on situational factors like "the test wasn't fair" and this effects their role as a student.

Roles are also frequently interconnected in a role set, that complement of role-relationships in which persons are involved by virtue of occupying a particular social status. For example, a high school football player carries the roles of student, athlete, classmate, etc. Another example of a role is "an individual in the role of a parent is expected to care for their child and protect them from harm".

== Role theory ==
Role theory is the sociological study of role development, concerned with explaining what forces cause people to develop the expectations of their own and others' behaviors. According to sociologist Bruce Biddle (1986), the five major models of role theory include:

1. Functional Role Theory, which examines role development as shared social norms for a given social position. These social positions may include leadership.
2. Symbolic Interactionist Role Theory, which examines role development as the outcome of individual interpretation of responses to behavior,
3. Structural Role Theory, which emphasises the influence of society rather than the individual in roles and utilizes mathematical models,
4. Organizational Role Theory, which examines role development in organizations, and
5. Cognitive Role Theory, which is summarized by Flynn and Lemay as "the relationship between expectations and behaviors"

=== Role in functionalist and consensus theory ===
The functionalist approach to role theory, which is largely borrowed from anthropology, sees a "role" as the set of expectations that society places on an individual. By unspoken consensus, certain behaviors are deemed "appropriate" and others "inappropriate". For example, an appropriate doctor dresses fairly conservatively, asks a series of personal questions about one's health, touches one in ways that would normally be forbidden, writes prescriptions, and shows more concern for the personal wellbeing of his or her clients than is expected of, say, an electrician or a shopkeeper.

"Role" is what the doctor does (or, at least, is expected to do) while status is what the doctor is; in other words, "status" is the position an actor occupies, while "role" is the expected behavior attached to that position. Roles are not limited to occupational status, of course, nor does the fact that one is cast in the role of "doctor" during working hours prevent one from taking on other roles at other times: spouse, friend, parent, and so on.

=== Role in interactionist or social action theory ===
In interactionist social theory, the concept of role is crucial. The interactionist definition of "role" pre-dates the functionalist one. A role, in this conception, is not fixed or prescribed but something that is constantly negotiated between individuals in a tentative, creative way. Philosopher George Herbert Mead explored roles in his seminal 1934 work, Mind, self and society. Mead's main interest was the way in which children learn how to become a part of society by imaginative role-taking, observing and mimicking others. This is always done in an interactive way: it's not meaningful to think of a role for one person alone, only for that person as an individual who is both co-operating and competing with others. Adults behave similarly: taking roles from those that they see around them, adapting them in creative ways, and (by the process of social interaction) testing them and either confirming them or modifying them. This can be most easily seen in encounters where there is considerable ambiguity, but is nevertheless something that is part of all social interactions: each individual actively tries to "define the situation" (understand their role within it); choose a role that is advantageous or appealing; play that role; and persuade others to support the role.

=== Social norms theory ===
Social norms theory states that much of people's behavior is influenced by their perception of how other members of their social group behave. When individuals are in a state of deindividuation, they see themselves only in terms of group identity, and their behavior is likely to be guided by group norms alone. But while group norms have a powerful effect on behavior, they can only guide behavior when they are activated by obvious reminders or by subtle cues. People adhere to social norms through enforcement, internalization, the sharing of norms by other group members, and frequent activation. Norms can be enforced through punishment or reward. Individuals are rewarded for living up to their roles (i.e. students getting an "A" on their exam) or punished for not completing the duties of their role (i.e. a salesperson is fired for not selling enough product).

Social norm theory has been applied as an environmental approach, with an aim of influencing individuals by manipulating their social and cultural environments. It has been widely applied using social marketing techniques. Normative messages are designed for delivery using various media and promotional strategies in order to effectively reach a target population. Social norms theory has also been successfully applied through strategies such as curriculum infusion, creating press coverage, policy development, and small group inventions.

==== The theory of planned behavior ====
People display reactance by fighting against threats to their freedom of action when they find norms inappropriate. Attitudes and norms typically work together to influence behavior (directly or indirectly). The theory of planned behavior intentions are a function of three factors: attitudes about the behavior, social norms relevant to the behavior, and perceptions of control over the behavior. When attitudes and norms disagree, their influence on behaviour will depend on their relative accessibility.

==== Team role theory ====
As described in Working in Groups by Engleberg and Wynn, team role theory is when "members assume roles that are compatible with their personal characteristics and skills". Meredith Belbin, a psychologist, first explored the concept of team-role theory in the 1970s when he and his research team went about observing teams and wanted to find out what made teams work and what did not. According to Belbin and his research team "the research revealed that the difference between success and failure for a team was not dependent on factors such as intellect, but more on behavior". They began to identify separate clusters of behaviors and found that behavior was more influential on a team than anything else. These separate clusters of behaviors are known as the "Team Roles". The nine "team roles" are as follows: coordinator/chairperson, shaper, innovator, resource investigator, monitor/evaluator, implementer, teamworker, completer/finisher, and specialist.

== Role conflict ==
There are situations where the prescribed sets of behavior that characterise roles may lead to cognitive dissonance in individuals. Role conflict is a special form of social conflict that takes place when one is forced to take on two different and incompatible roles at the same time. An example of role conflict is a father, who is a baseball coach, that is torn between his role as a father by wanting to let his son be the pitcher and his role as a coach who should let the more experienced pitcher play.

== Role confusion ==
Role confusion occurs in a situation where an individual has trouble determining which role he or she should play, but where the roles are not necessarily incompatible. For example, if a college student attending a social function encounters his teacher as a fellow guest, he will have to determine whether to relate to the teacher as a student or a peer.

== Role enhancement ==
Role enhancement or role enrichment refers to a situation in which roles which are held by a person are compatible and moreover enacting one role has beneficial spillover effects on the enactment of the other role. An example of role enhancement is a nurse who assists a patient in improving relationships by "clarifying and supplementing specific role behaviors". Some evidence indicates that role conflict and role enhancement can occur simultaneously, and further evidence suggests that mental health correlates with low role conflict and high role enhancement. Also certain personality traits, in particular traits linked to perceiving and seeking greater levels of support, are associated with lower inter-role conflict and increase inter-role enrichment.

== Role strain ==
Role strain is "the incompatibility among roles corresponding to a single status". An example of role strain is "a student who is torn between the obligations of school, their parents, and their job". This is role strain because the status of being a student comes with multiple responsibilities that make it difficult to handle all at the same time.

== Gender roles ==
Gender roles are "sets of behavioral norms assumed to accompany one's status as male or female". Gender roles are "one of the most popular strains of thought to evolve from role theory" because it can be applied to one's status as a male or female in everyday life. It has been argued that gender "constitutes as a master status" because the status of gender holds a power in society. An example of gender role is baby boys being associated with the color blue and baby girls being associated with the color pink. As people get older, women are traditionally assigned the role of being a stay at home mother and men are assigned the role of being the breadwinner of the family.

== See also ==
- Conflict theory
- Gender role
- Label (sociology)
- Sick role
- Purpose in life
- Role-playing
- Role engulfment
- Role model
- Role suction
- Social position
- Social status
- Master status
- Achieved status
- Ascribed status
- Stereotypes
- Transactional analysis
- The Fundamentals of Social Roles

== Bibliography ==
- Biddle, BJ. (1986). "Recent Developments in Role Theory". Annual Review of Sociology. 12: 67–92. Bibcode:1986ARSoc..12...67B. doi:10.1146/annurev.so.12.080186.000435.
- Chandler, Daniel. "Television an Gender Roles"
- Goldhagen, Daniel Jonah. Hitler's Willing Executioners: Ordinary Germans and the Holocaust. Vintage Books, New York. 1996.
- Macionis, John J. (2006). Society – The Basics (8th ed.). Upper Saddle River, NJ: Pearson Prentice Hall. ISBN 978-0131922440.
- Main Frame: Strategies for Generating Social Norms News. 2002.
- Merton, Robert K. (1957). "The Role Set Problems In Sociological Theory". British Journal of Sociology. 8 (2): 106–120. doi:10.2307/587363. JSTOR 587363.
- Nagle, Brendan D. (2006). The Ancient World: A Social and Cultural History (6th ed.). Upper Saddle River, NJ: Pearson Prentice Hall.
- Smith, Eliot (2007). Social Psychology (3rd ed.). New York: Psychology Press.
- Stark, Rodney (2007). Sociology (10th ed.). California: Baylor University. Thomson Wadsworth.
- The Twisted Dream. Time Life, Alexandria, Virginia. 1990.
