= Achieved status =

Social position achieved by actions

Achieved status is a concept developed by the anthropologist Ralph Linton for a social position that a person can acquire on the basis of merit and is earned or chosen through one's own effort. It is the opposite of ascribed status and reflects personal skills, abilities, and efforts. Examples of achieved status include being an Olympic medalist, college graduate, technical professional, tenured professor, or tournament winner.

Status is important sociologically because it comes with achieved rights, obligations, behaviors, and duties that people occupying a certain position are expected or encouraged to perform. Those expectations are referred to as roles. For instance, the role of a professor includes teaching students, answering questions, and being impartial and appropriate.

== Compared to ascribed status ==
Ascribed status is a position assigned to individuals or groups based on traits beyond their control, such as sex, race, or parental social status. It is usually associated with closed societies. Achieved status is distinguished from ascribed status by virtue of being earned through the set of accomplished tasks and/or goals.

Many positions are a mixture of achievement and ascription. For instance, a person who has achieved the status of being a physician is more likely to have the ascribed status of being born into a wealthy family. That is usually associated with open societies or social-class societies.

== Social mobility ==
Social mobility refers to one's ability to move their status either up or down the social stratification system, compared with their family's status in early life. Some people with achieved status have improved their position in the social system by their own merit and achievements. However others may have either cheated or unintentionally gained status.

Someone may also have achieved status that decreases their position within the social system, such as by becoming a notorious criminal. A society in which people's position in that society can change by their actions, by increasing or decreasing, can be referred to as an open system. A closed system society allows less social mobility.

== Cultural capital ==
Cultural capital is a concept, developed by the sociologist Pierre Bourdieu. It can refer to both achieved and ascribed characteristics, which are desirable qualities (either material or symbolic) that contribute to one's social status: any advantages that a person has and give him or her a higher status in society.

It may include high expectations, forms of knowledge, skill, or education.

Parents provide children with cultural capital, the attitudes and knowledge that make the educational system a comfortable familiar place in which they can succeed easily. There are other types of capital as well.

Social capital refers to one's membership in groups, relationships, and networks. It can also have a significant impact on achievement level.

=== Education ===
Industrialization has led to a vast increase in the possible standard of living for the average person but also made that increase necessary. For the productivity of the average worker to rise, he or she had to receive far more education and training, which successively made the average worker much less replaceable and thus more powerful. Hence, it became necessary to satisfy workers' demands for a larger share.

=== Employment ===
According to the sociologist Rodney Stark, few Americans believe that coming from a wealthy family or having political connections is necessary to get ahead. In contrast, many people in other industrialized nations think those factors are necessary for advancement. Americans are more likely than the people in those nations to rate "hard work" as very important for getting ahead. Most nations value hard work, but Italians, for example, are hardly more likely to rate it as very important than they are to think that political connections are needed.

=== Income ===
People with a lower income will generally be a better example of moving up in the social stratification and achieving status. That holds to be evident in most cases because those who accrue a lower income may either have the motivation to achieve a greater status, or face financial pressure, and attempt to follow their own ambitions and hard work. Those of higher income may the result of achieving status, however other factors are at play, such as scarcity of skills, promotion abilities. Positions may also pay better in some areas than others.

In other cases, the people with higher incomes may have unjustly acquired that position or were ascribed their status and income (such as monarchs, family-run businesses, etc.). They may have also gained a higher income position by chance.

Those without the privilege of ascribing their status generally have the greater motivation of achieving their own status. The general economic well-being of the society in which they live also tends to be another factor in their status and the extent that they are able to achieve their status.

For example, Americans are less likely than people in other industrialized nations to object to current income variances. According to Rodney Stark, in 1992, only 27% of Americans strongly agreed that income disparities in their country were too large. In contrast, more than half of Russians, Italians, and Bulgarians agreed with that statement.

== Stratification systems around the world ==
In all societies, a person's social status is the result of both ascribed and achieved characteristics. Societies differ markedly on several dimensions in that process: the attributes that are used to assign status, the relative importance of ascribed or achieved attributes, the overall potential for social mobility, the rates of mobility that actually occur, and the barriers to particular subgroups enjoying upward mobility.

== Cultural differences around the world ==
=== Medieval Europe ===
One's status in medieval Europe was primarily based on ascription. People born into the noble class were likely to keep a high position and people born of peasants were likely to stay in a low position. This political system is known as feudalism and does not allow for much social mobility.

=== Feudalism in Latin America ===
Bolivia used to have newspaper advertisements that claimed to have land, animals and peasants for sale. The peasants were not necessarily slaves but placed in their social class and required to work because they were bound to the land on which they lived and that they farmed. That sort of social interaction is based mainly on the people's strong belief of tradition and to uphold the actions of the past. In 1971, Ernesto Laclau addressed the argument of Latin America was feudalist or capitalist. He determined that the social system was very different from the capitalist system in Europe and the United States and so Latin America would be more closely related to having a feudalist approach to social interaction.

=== Caste system ===
The formation of a hierarchy differs from the polarities of both given and achieved status. In caste systems, ascription is the overpowering basis for status. Traditional society in South Asia and other parts of the world such as Egypt, India, Bali, Tibet, and Japan were composed of castes. Each group was limited to certain occupations. Low-paying occupations such as collecting garbage were reserved for one caste, whose members were excluded from holding any other occupation. Correspondingly, highly skilled occupations, such as being a priest or a goldsmith, were reserved for another caste.

However, some people managed through talent and luck to rise above their given caste. For example, great aptitude as a soldier was often a way to reach a higher status.

== See also ==
- Achievement ideology
- Ascribed status
- Identity performance
- Master status
- Positional good
- Social class
- Social hierarchy
- Social status
- Social structure of the United States
- Status attainment
- Status symbol

== Bibliography ==
- Linton, Ralph (1936). The Study of Man: An Introduction. online edition
- Stark, Rodney (2007). Sociology (10th ed.). Thomson Wadsworth. ISBN 978-0-495-09344-2.
- Wise, M (2005). Cultural Capital, Habitus and Sense of Belonging in Medical School: The Impact of Ascribed and Achieved Status. online edition
- Rose, Peter (1982). Sociology: Inquiring into Society (2nd ed.). St. Martin's Press. ISBN 0-312-73984-2.
- Shepard, Jon; Robert W. Greene (2003). Sociology and You. Ohio: Glencoe McGraw-Hill. pp. A-22. ISBN 0-07-828576-3. Archived from the original on 2010-03-08.
- McDonagh, Eileen (1982). "To Work or Not to Work: The Differential Impact of Achieved and Derived Status upon the Political Participation of Women". American Journal of Political Science. 26 (2): 280–297. doi:10.2307/2111040. JSTOR 2111040.
