= Rankism =

Rank-based discrimination

Rankism is "abusive, discriminatory, and/or exploitative behavior towards people because of their rank in a particular hierarchy". Rank-based abuse underlies many other phenomena such as bullying, racism, supremacism (often white supremacy), xenophobia, hazing, ageism, sexism, ableism, sanism, antisemitism, Islamophobia, homophobia and transphobia. The term "rankism" was popularized by physicist, educator, and citizen diplomat Robert W. Fuller.

== Characteristics ==
Rankism can take many forms, including

- exploiting one's position within a hierarchy to secure unwarranted advantages and benefits (e.g. massive corporate bonuses);
- abusing a position of power (e.g., abusive parent or priest, corrupt CEO, bully boss, prisoner abuse);
- using rank as a shield to get away with insulting or humiliating others with impunity;
- using rank to maintain a position of power long after it can be justified;
- exporting the rank achieved in one sphere of activity to claim superior value as a person;
- exploiting rank that is illegitimately acquired or held (as in situations resting on specious distinctions of social rank, such as racism, sexism, intellectualism, wealth, religious beliefs, hereditary, marital status, gang affiliation, criminal record, egotism or classism).

Rankism can occur in any social hierarchy, such as governments, corporations, families, non-profit organizations, and universities.

== Use of term ==
The term rankism first appeared in print in the Oberlin Alumni Magazine for fall of 1997. It later appeared in a book called Somebodies and Nobodies: Overcoming the Abuse of Rank, written by Fuller and published in 2003.

The first use of the term in a management journal occurred in 2001 in a Leader to Leader Institute article. The piece questioned the abuse of rank in work hierarchies. The idea of rankism has since been widely covered in the media, including The New York Times, NPR, C-SPAN, The Boston Globe, the BBC, Voice of America, and O, The Oprah Magazine.

Other notable references of rankism include Fuller's second book on the subject, All Rise: Somebodies, Nobodies, and the Politics of Dignity, and an action-oriented guide titled Dignity for All: How to Create a World Without Rankism.

The Human Dignity and Humiliation Studies (Human DHS) network has also accepted the concept of rankism as core to its mission. It asserts, "...the mission we have undertaken at Human DHS is the confrontation of abuse, rankism and the humiliation endemic to it, on the historical scale."

Professional mediator Julia Ann Wambach uses Fuller's definition of rankism to explore the abuse of position within a hierarchy from both up and down the lines of power, including how rankism feeds on itself in group contexts.

== Rankism and dignity ==
According to Fuller, the abuse of rank is experienced by victims as an affront to their dignity. Fuller and his supporters have launched a new social movement to promote the creation of a dignitarian society. The Dignity Movement's goal is to overcome rankism in the same way that the civil rights movement and women's movements target racism and sexism.

== See also ==
- Abuse
- Bullying
- Caste
- Class discrimination
- Discrimination
- Elitism
- Exploitation
- Minority influence
- Power harassment
- Ranked society
- Structural violence
- Supremacism
