= Age stratification =

Hierarchical ranking of people into age groups

Age stratification exists because processes in society ensure that people of different ages differ in their access to society's rewards, power, and privileges.
—Age Stratification, Sociology: the essentials

In sociology, age stratification refers to the hierarchical ranking of people into age groups within a society. Age stratification could also be defined as a system of inequalities linked to age. In Western societies, for example, both the old and the young are perceived and treated as relatively incompetent and excluded from much social life. Age stratification based on an ascribed status is a major source inequality, and thus may lead to ageism. Ageism is a social inequality resulting from age stratification. This is a sociological concept that comes with studying aging population. Age stratification within a population can have major implications, affecting things such as workforce trends, social norms, family structures, government policies, and even health outcomes.

== Age structure ==
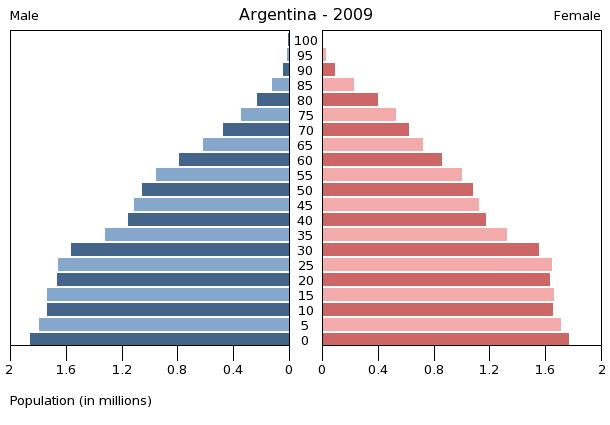
Argentina population pyramid 2009

Age stratification is not a fixed phenomenon, but rather varies with the passage of time and between cultures and populations. Shifting age structure of a population changes the age stratification. As life expectancy has increased dramatically in the last two centuries, the age strata by which people are characterized has changed. With people living longer lives than ever before in more developed areas of the world, there is now a category of "old-old" people which refers to persons ages 85+. Changes in the age structure of populations affects the way in which they distribute resources, along with a shift in expectations from different age strata. For example, as Japan's population has dramatically aged - with individuals aged 65+ accounting for approximately 25% of the population - the country has found itself with an unfavorable dependency ratio. In an effort to avoid economic downfall, the expectations of young-old and middle-old people have changed. Elderly citizens are encouraged to put off retirement, and the elderly tech market is booming.

== Age discrimination ==
Age is a major component of entry and exit for many parts of life – school, starting a family, retirement, etc. Shifting social status with age can lead to ageism. Discrimination by a person's age can have profound impacts on the way a society operates – including behavioral expectations, the distribution of resources, and even policies and laws.

=== Workplace ===
In the United States, discrimination on the basis of one's age is prohibited in the workplace by the Age Discrimination in Employment Act of 1967. Enforced by the Equal Employment Opportunity Commission, the act is meant to keep employers unbiased in regards to age when dealing with hiring, promotions, terms, etc. The law also makes it illegal for employees to be harassed due to their age. Emergence of new occupations can lead to a polarization of age cohorts by workforce. As a result, a quick shift of the occupational distribution increases occupational age discrimination.

=== Health outcomes ===
The unequal distribution of resources and social support between age strata can lead to health disparities in the population. In the U.S., evidence indicates older adults face higher risk of experiencing depression and other mental health issues.

== See also ==
- Gerontology
