= Eileen McDonagh =

American political scientist

- Education: Harvard University
- Awards: J. David Greenstone Book Prize, APSA
- Scientific career
- Fields: Political science
- Workplaces: Northeastern University

Eileen McDonagh is an American political scientist. She is a professor of political science at Northeastern University. She has published works on topics like women's participation in politics, gender imbalances in sport, and abortion law.

== Education and academic positions ==
McDonagh graduated from Harvard University with a PhD in government in 1972. In addition to being a member of the political science faculty at Northeastern University, she has been a visiting scholar in the Center for Advanced Study in the Behavioral Sciences at Stanford University, at the Institute for Quantitative Social Science at Harvard University, and at Radcliffe College's Murray Research Center.

== Research ==
In addition to journal articles and book chapters, McDonagh has written several books. McDonagh wrote the 1996 book Breaking the Abortion Deadlock: From Choice to Consent. McDonagh builds on arguments by thinkers like Judith Jarvis Thomson and Laurence Tribe, contending that pregnancy constitutes a relationship between a woman and a fetus which relies on the fetus's use of the woman's body, and that consequently the woman's consent should be required for the relationship to be legitimate. From this, McDonagh reasons that abortion is therefore a form of state protection for a woman's right to defend her bodily autonomy. Charlotte Ellertson called Breaking the Abortion Deadlock "the most thought-provoking addition to a stale abortion debate to emerge in 25 years", including "one of the most logical and consistent pro-choice arguments articulated to date".

With Laura Pappano, McDonagh published Playing with the Boys: Why Separate Is Not Equal in Sports in 2008. The authors examine the history of legal and social policies that have caused gender imbalances in both competitive and recreational sports.

In 2009, McDonagh published the book The Motherless State: Women's Political Leadership and American Democracy, in which she proposes that the low proportion of women elected to political office in the United States is partly a function of the overlap between the types of policies that the United States government has traditionally pursued and stereotypes about what tasks are best administered by men and women. The book won the 2010 J. David Greenstone Book Prize for "the best book in history and politics in the past two calendar years" from the American Political Science Association. McDonagh has also studied and spoken about women's participation in the politics of Massachusetts specifically.

McDonagh's work has been cited or she has published in Fast Company, The Christian Science Monitor, and HuffPost.

== Selected works ==
- Breaking the Abortion Deadlock: From Choice to Consent (1996)
- Playing with the Boys: Why Separate Is Not Equal in Sports, with Laura Pappano (2008)
- The Motherless State: Women's Political Leadership and American Democracy (2009)

== Selected awards ==
- Best paper award, American Political Science Association Women and Politics Research Section (1994)
- Best paper award, American Political Science Association Women and Politics Research Section (2002)
- J. David Greenstone Book Prize, American Political Science Association (2010)
