= Systems of social stratification =

Some cultures have patrilineal inheritance, where only male children can inherit, or matrilineal succession, where property can only pass along the female line. Others have egalitarian inheritance, without discrimination based on gender and/or birth order.

== Africa ==
=== Southern Africa ===
The social structure prevalent among the southern Bantu informed their religious beliefs. The expansion of southern Bantu peoples, such as for example the Xhosa, is attributed to the fission of younger sons.

Patrilineal primogeniture prevailed among the Xhosa ("each eldest son, upon the death of his father, inherits all the property appertaining to his mother's house"), the Pondo, the Tswana, the Ndebele, the Swazi, the Zulus, the Sotho, the Tsonga, the Venda and most other southern Bantu peoples; among them in general the first son was conceived of as superior to his siblings.

The Zulus also practiced patrilineal primogeniture, allowing only minimal grants of land to younger sons.

Customs of male primogeniture also prevailed among the Sotho.

Precedence within clans and tribes based on patrilineal primogeniture was also common among the Khoi and the Damara.

=== West Africa ===
The Hausa did not have the conical clan as their system of social organization (in Africa, this system predominated mostly among southern African peoples), but had a complex system of hereditary social stratification as well.

The British thought that the Hausa Law of Primogeniture was bad because it encouraged usury and mortgage.

=== East Africa ===
A system of ranking and patrilineal primogeniture similar to that of many southern African peoples seems to have traditionally prevailed among the Nilotic peoples of South Sudan with regards to land (the eldest son of the first wife was the heir of his father's land, residential and arable, and the land of each house was inherited by the heir of that house, i.e., the eldest son of the head wife in the house); thus, a similar lineage system prevailed among some Nilotic peoples like the Lugbara or the Dinka.

=== Central Africa ===
Sahlins considered the conical clan typical of some central African Bantu lineage organizations. Éric de Dampierre found this type of social organization to be prevalent among the Azande.

Patrilineal primogeniture also prevailed among the Songye and the Buduma, according to the Ethnographic Atlas.

== Austronesia ==
=== General ===
In traditional Austronesian societies (roughly those of modern-day Malaysia, Indonesia, Philippines, East Timor, Brunei, Madagascar and Oceania), seniority of birth and of descent generally determined rank, often leading to the fission of those lowest in rank (younger sons from younger branches), a fact often cited by anthropologists as the cause of Austronesian expansion throughout Southeast Asia, Oceania and even the Indian Ocean, in places such as Madagascar and Mauritius. Other terms have also been used to describe this type of social organization, such as "status lineage" (Goldman) "apical demotion" (Fox) or "ramage" (Firth). Sahlins also created the concept of the "Big Man", a type of man in Melanesian societies who becomes a leader not due to his fraternal birth order as in Polynesian societies, but to his ability and charisma. Melanesian societies could either be dominated by the conical clan as Polynesian societies or by an egalitarian system of social organization as most Papuan societies (though even some Papuan societies were characterized by a predominance of patrilineal primogeniture, like for example the society of Goodenough Island). In Micronesia, the system was matrilineal and brothers succeeded each other in order of seniority; when the line of brothers was extinguished, the eldest son of the eldest sister succeeded, and so on in each successive generation.

=== Polynesia ===
==== New Guinea ====
Richard F. Salisbury described a sort of conical-like clan structure similar to the Polynesian one, although of a much less developed nature, in New Guinea.

== Asia ==
=== China ===
The ramage or conical prevailed in early China, during the Longshan culture period and the period of the Three Dynasties (Xia, Shang and Zhou dynasties).

During the time of the Zhou dynasty, patrilineal primogeniture, also called the tsung-fa system, was also the norm.

The tsung-fa system was also called "extensive stratified patrilineage".

Strong traits of the tsung-fa system of patrilineal primogeniture survived in the lineage organizations of north China until the communist era.

This type of unlineal descent-group later became the model of the Korean family through the influence of Neo-Confucianism, as Zhu Xi and others advocated its re-establishment in China.

=== South Asia ===
In South Asia, the Aryans were also organized in a system of ranked patrilines where senior patrilines were superior to junior patrilines.

The Paite had a similar system, strongly based on primogeniture and patrilineality and reinforced by a characteristic system of name-giving:

A conical clan system also prevailed among the Nagas. In the beginning it vas based on a principle of male ultimogeniture, being very similar to Kachin gumsa; however, when all available land had been divided between communities in a given neighbourhood, male primogeniture became the dominant principle.

=== Inner Asia ===
Owen Lattimore wrote that the Mongols have a clan structure comprising ruling and subordinate clans, and that the elite clans are themselves internally divided into junior and elder lineages. Karl Kaser attributes the inexistence of different terms to designate an elder and a younger brother in European languages to the high prevalence of ultimogeniture among the European peasantry. Although male primogeniture came to be almost universal in the European aristocracy, peasants practiced both male primogeniture and ultimogeniture, and thus there was no overall preeminence of elder over younger brothers or vice versa. He says that among peoples of Inner Asian origin, by contrast, seniority between sons was emphasized, and thus there were separate terms to designate elder and younger brothers in their languages. Indeed, the Mongol kinship, for example, is according to Lévi-Strauss one of a type where sons must be carefully distinguished according to seniority, because of the complexity of the right of inheritance, which contemplates not only seniority of birth but also of patriline. The anthropologist Herbert Harold Vreeland, who visited three Mongol communities in 1920, published a highly detailed book with the results of his field study, "Mongol community and kinship structure", now publicly available. In this book he explained the ranking system prevalent in traditional Mongol communities.

A strict fraternal hierarchy prevailed among Mongols, and slave (bogol) is equated with the category of a younger brother in The Secret History. In another passage Ogodei, though being the Great Khan, still asks for the permission of his elder brother Chagatai to invade Cathay, and Tolui sacrifices himself for his elder brother Ogodei. In the Yuan shi it is told that Nayan, weeping and beating his head to the floor, refused to accept a princely title because he had an elder brother, Qurumchi, whom he thought ought to inherit it in spite of his lower ability; in the end Qurumchi inherited the title, but he consulted with Nayan in all affairs. Mongol literature is full of events of this kind. Models of opposition between the egalitarianism of Arab societies and the hierarchical tribalism of Turco-Mongol peoples have been developed by many anthropologists, such as Cuisenier, Beck, Barfield, and Lindholm.

Some studies have found that Arab practices of endogamous marriage also benefitted elder sons and their lines of descent over younger sons and their lines of descent, thus contradicting the idea that in Arab societies, unlike in those of Inner Asia, fraternal birth order played no role at all in family relationships.

It was customary in the Ottoman Empire to let the sons of a king fight amongst themselves for the kingdom. It was almost always the eldest son, however, who succeeded in gaining the throne for himself, such as in the cases of Bayezid II, Mehmet III or Murad III. Other scholars have also considered Kazakh society an especially good example of the Inner Asian conical clan, although others consider Mongol society the paradigm of this type of society in the Asian steppe. Buryats, for example, validated land ownership at clan gatherings. Uzbek traditional society has been analyzed under the same light. The development of conical clan structures has been linked to an increase in warfare and military expansionism in Central Asia.

=== Japan, Korea, Vietnam ===
Lineage hierarchy was present in the stem-family systems of Korea, Vietnam and Japan. In Korea, the main house, that of the eldest son, was called the "big house" or superordinate descent group (taejong), while the houses of younger sons were called "small houses" or subordinate descent groups (sojong). It was through the stem family of the eldest son that the main line of descent was traced from generation to generation. Patrilineal primogeniture became prevalent during the time of the Choson dynasty. Even modern businesses are passed down according to male primogeniture in most cases.

In Japan, too, the main house, that of the eldest son, was called "honke", while the houses of younger sons were called "bunke". Younger houses were theoretically subordinate to the eldest house. There was a peculiar family type, the dozoku, which consistently reproduced this hierarchical arrangement.

Lineage hierarchy was also present in the Vietnamese family.

=== Myanmar ===
The conical clan of the Asian steppe, Austronesian societies and southern Bantu societies was based on a rule of primogeniture. The Kachin gave most of the land to the youngest son (patrilineal ultimogeniture) and most of the moveable property to the eldest son (patrilineal primogeniture). Middle sons and their descendants are ranked even below eldest sons and their descendants. In case of death or inability of the youngest son, the eldest son inherits the land as well, in preference to a middle son. According to the same author, this principle of ultimogeniture-primogeniture is reversed in Assam and the North Triangle; among the Kachin population of these regions, the eldest son inherits the house and lands of the father and the youngest son inherits the moveable property. The opposite gumlao situation is that of a more democratic and flexible system and emerges when chiefs and/or aristocrats are led to repudiate Kachin social rules, especially patrilineal ultimogeniture, partly due to the influence of the Shan, who do not employ this mode of inheritance.

== America ==
=== North America ===
Ranking by matrilineal primogeniture (the nephews of a man by an elder sister rank higher than his nephews by a younger sister) prevailed among the Natchez.

=== Mexico, Central America and South America ===
The conical clan was also the form of social organization among many peoples in Pre-Columbian America, like the Aztecs (calpulli); the Inca, where this anthropological concept originated, created by Kirchoff to describe the form of Inca social organization, the ayllu, also described by Isabel Yaya in her book; and the lowland tribes of Central and South America described by Kalervo Oberg.

The Gê-speaking peoples of the Amazonia were also organized in conical clans.

Some isolated lowland tribes of Central and South America have also preserved the conical clan as their form of social organization. Such is the case of the Koji people of Colombia.

In the South Cone, ranking by patrilineal primogeniture prevailed among the Mapuche.

== Other peoples ==
C. Scott Littleton has suggested that ranking by patrilineal ultimogeniture could have prevailed in Proto-Indo-European society.

It is possible that even the Proto-Germanic word for "king" (kuningaz) derived initially from the word for "youngest son" (see Rígsþula).

== See also ==
- Historical inheritance systems
