= Social position =

Position of an individual in a given society and culture

Social position is the position of an person in a given society and culture. A given position (for example, the occupation of priest) may belong to multiple individuals.

== Definition ==
Stanley Wasserman and Katherine Faust Stanley cautioned that "there is considerable disagreement among social scientists about the definitions of the related concepts of social position, social status, and social role." They note that while many scholars differentiate those terms, they can define those terms in a way that clashes with the definitions of another scholar; for example they state that "[Ralph] Linton uses the term 'status' in a way that is identical to our use of the term "position".

Social positions an individual may hold fall into the categories of occupation (medical doctor, academic lecturer), profession (member of associations and organisations), family (parent, sibling, etc.), hobby (member of various clubs and organisations), among others. An individual is likely to create a personal hierarchy of such positions, where one will be a central position while the rest are peripheral positions.

Social positions are visible if they require an individual to wear a uniform or some other kind of identifying mark. Often individual clothes or other attributes will advertise what social position one has at the moment. Non-visible social positions are called hidden. A position that is deemed the most important to a given individual is called central, others are peripheral. If a sequence of positions is required to obtain a given position, it can be defined as a career, and a change of position in this context is a promotion or demotion. Some social positions may make it easier for a given person to obtain others; in other cases, some positions may be restricted to individuals meeting specific criteria.

Social position together with social role determines an individual's place in the social environment and social organisation. A group of social positions will create a social class and a social circle.

A social conflict caused by interference between social positions is called a position conflict.

== Research ==
=== Subjective social position ===
Subjective social position refers to an individual's perceived social position in a social hierarchy. According to Kristina Lindemann the individual objective characteristics like education, occupation and income are related with the subjective social position. In addition, the culture and society that a person lives and grows in, heavily impacts an individual's subjective social position. "An individual's subjective social position status depends not only on the objective characteristics but also on how people experience society, the way they perceive their position in comparison with others, and what they imagine their position would be in the future." Lindemann divides objective characteristics into two groups, ascribed and achieved characteristics. Ascribed characteristics are things like age, gender, and ethnicity. Achieved characteristics are things like the education level, occupation, or income. Studies have indicated a significant relevance of these characteristics to an individual's subjective social position.

On the other hand, some theories expect that objective characteristics do not have influence on subjective social position. The reference group theory mentioned by Lindemann in her essay states that people see the world as an enlarged version of their reference group. People base their social position upon the people around them. Typically people's family, friends, and co-workers are usually similar, and in general, most people see themselves as average and unexceptional. The status maximizing process also mentioned by Lindemann means that subjective social position reflects also person prospects and hopes for future societal attainment.

Lindemann's empirical study focuses on Estonian society. Age is considered an impactful characteristic on people when identifying with their social position in Estonia. Young people give higher estimation to their social position, which is a tendency also found in other Eastern European countries. Gender and ethnicity, are also considerable characteristics in identifying social position. In general, the subjective social position of men and women is not significantly different in western countries. Ethnicity impacts social position differently from country to country. More importantly the influence of ethnicity is closely related to the extent ethnic minorities are accepted by the overall society.

Different studies have shown that the effect of income on class identification in particular has increased during the last decades in Western countries. In Estonia, the income is the most important determinant that shapes people opinion of their social position. The increased influence of income on the subjective social position can be explained by the rise of consumer society values. In her studies Lindemann also found that occupation and education influence significantly the subjective social position. As expected, managers and professionals and higher educated people identify with the middle or higher strata, while unskilled workers and low educated people relate with the lower positions in social hierarchy.

In several studies, researchers have assessed Individuals' perceived social position using the single-item MacArthur scale of subjective social status. The MacArthur scale of subjective social status is a drawing of a ten-rung ladder presented as the distribution of individuals in a social hierarchy. People with the highest salaries, best ranked jobs and highest education levels are depicted as standing on the upper rungs of the ladder, whereas those with the lowest salaries, poorest jobs, and lowest education levels are those who stand at the bottom of the ladder.

=== Social class ===
A social class (or, simply, class), as in class society, is a set of subjectively defined concepts in the social sciences and political theory centered on models of social stratification in which people are grouped into a set of hierarchical social categories, the most common being the upper, middle, and lower classes.

Class is a subject of analysis for sociologists, political scientists, anthropologists, and social historians. However, there is not a consensus on a definition of "class", and the term has a wide range of sometimes conflicting meanings. In common parlance, the term "social class" is usually synonymous with "socio-economic class", defined as "people having the same social, economic, cultural, political or educational status", e.g., "the working class"; "an emerging professional class". However, academics distinguish social class and socioeconomic status, with the former referring to one's relatively stable sociocultural background and the latter referring to one's current social and economic situation and, consequently, being more changeable over time.

The precise measurements of what determines social class in society has varied over time. Karl Marx thought "class" was defined by one's relationship to the means of production (their relations of production). His simple understanding of classes in modern capitalist society, are the proletariat, those who work but do not own the means of production; and the bourgeoisie, those who invest and live off of the surplus generated by the former. This contrasts with the view of the sociologist Max Weber, who argued "class" is determined by economic position, in contrast to "social status" or "Stand" which is determined by social prestige rather than simply just relations of production.

The term "class" is etymologically derived from the Latin classis, which was used by census takers to categorize citizens by wealth, in order to determine military service obligations.

In the late 18th century, the term "class" began to replace classifications such as estates, rank, and orders as the primary means of organizing society into hierarchical divisions. This corresponded to a general decrease in significance ascribed to hereditary characteristics, and increase in the significance of wealth and income as indicators of position in the social hierarchy.

=== Human capital ===
One way to change one's social position is to increase human capital. The human capital theory suggest that people having more job-relevant resources, such as education and training, should receive more organizational rewards i.e. promotions than people with fewer of these resources. Human capital alone can affect social position to a certain extent. An individual has to have social skills and build social networks to help promote their social position.

=== Social capital ===
Another way to effectively increase one's chance of obtaining or sustaining social position is by increasing social capital. The social capital theory posits that certain qualities in workplace relationships are beneficial for receiving organizational rewards, and employees whose relationships are not characterized by these qualities are at a disadvantage. In other words, people who have social relationships with upper management might get to know about a promotion possibility before someone lacking in the social capital infrastructure that relays that sort of information.

Erika James finds through studies and analysis that in general blacks have been promoted at a slower pace than whites. This workplace discrimination occurred most likely because of unequal human/social capital between the two races. Clearly this is not a justification for the actions to occur. The issue of race still exists as a statistically proven factor in American job markets.

=== Trust ===
For an individual to hold a social position thoroughly and knowledgeably they must be trusted in the market and reflect it in their behavior. Paul S. Adler says that a review of trends in employment relations, interdivisional relations, and interfirm relations finds evidence suggesting that the effect of growing knowledge-intensity may indeed be a trend toward greater reliance on trust. He believes the form of trust that is most effective in this context is of a distinctively modern kind - "reflective trust" - as opposed to traditionalistic, "blind" trust.

The values at work in modern trust are those of the scientific community: "universalism, communism, disinterestedness, organized skepticism" (Merton 1973, p. 270). Modern trust is inclusive and open. The author concludes that the efficacy of trust for knowledge management and the likelihood of its growth over time are maximized if:

1. Trust is balanced by hierarchical rules to ensure stability and equity
2. Trust is balanced by market competition to ensure flexibility and opportunity
3. Trust is modern and reflective rather than traditionalistic and blind

There is an element of trust necessary within society and for identifying with a particular social position - especially relevant to particular community positions where one's actions weigh heavily on one's social position.

== See also ==
- Identity
- Role engulfment
- Social class
- Social status
