= Social status =

Position within social structure

Social status is the relative level of social value a person is considered to possess. Such social value includes respect, honor, assumed competence, and deference. On one hand, social scientists view status as a "reward" for group members who treat others well and take initiative. This is one explanation for its apparent cross-cultural universality. People with higher status experience a litany of benefits—such as greater health, admiration, resources, influence, and freedom; conversely, those with lower status experience poorer outcomes across all of those metrics.

Importantly, status is based in widely shared beliefs about who members of a society judge as more competent or moral. While such beliefs can stem from an impressive performance or success, they can also arise from possessing characteristics a society has deemed meaningful, such as a person's race or occupation. In this way, status reflects how a society judges a person's relative social worth and merit—however accurate or inaccurate that judgement may be. Because societies use status to allocate resources, leadership positions, and other forms of power, status can make unequal distributions of resources and power appear natural and fair, supporting systems of social stratification.

== Definition ==
The sociologist Max Weber outlined three central aspects of stratification in a society: class, status, and power. In his scheme, which remains influential today, people possess status in the sense of honor because they belong to specific groups with unique lifestyles and privileges. Modern sociologists and social psychologists broadened this understanding of status to refer to one's relative level of respectability and honor more generally.

Some writers have also referred to a socially valued role or category a person occupies as a "status" (e.g., gender, social class, ethnicity, having a criminal conviction, having a mental illness, etc.). As social network analysts, Stanley Wasserman and Katherine Faust Stanley cautioned "there is considerable disagreement among social scientists about the definitions of the related concepts of social position, social status, and social role." They note that while many scholars differentiate those terms, they can define those terms in a way that clashes with the definitions of another scholar; for example they state that "[Ralph] Linton uses the term 'status' in a way that is identical to our use of the term "position".

== Determination ==
Status hierarchies depend primarily on the possession and use of status symbols. These are cues or characteristics that people in a society agree indicate how much status a person holds and how they should be treated. Such symbols can include the possession of valued attributes, like being beautiful or having a prestigious degree. Other status symbols include wealth and its display through conspicuous consumption. Status in face-to-face interaction can also be conveyed through certain controllable behaviors, such as assertive speech, posture, and emotional displays. Social network analysts have also shown that one's affiliations can also be a source of status. Several studies document that being popular or demonstrating dominance over peers increases a person's status. Analyses of private companies also find that organizations can gain status from having well-respected corporate partners or investors.

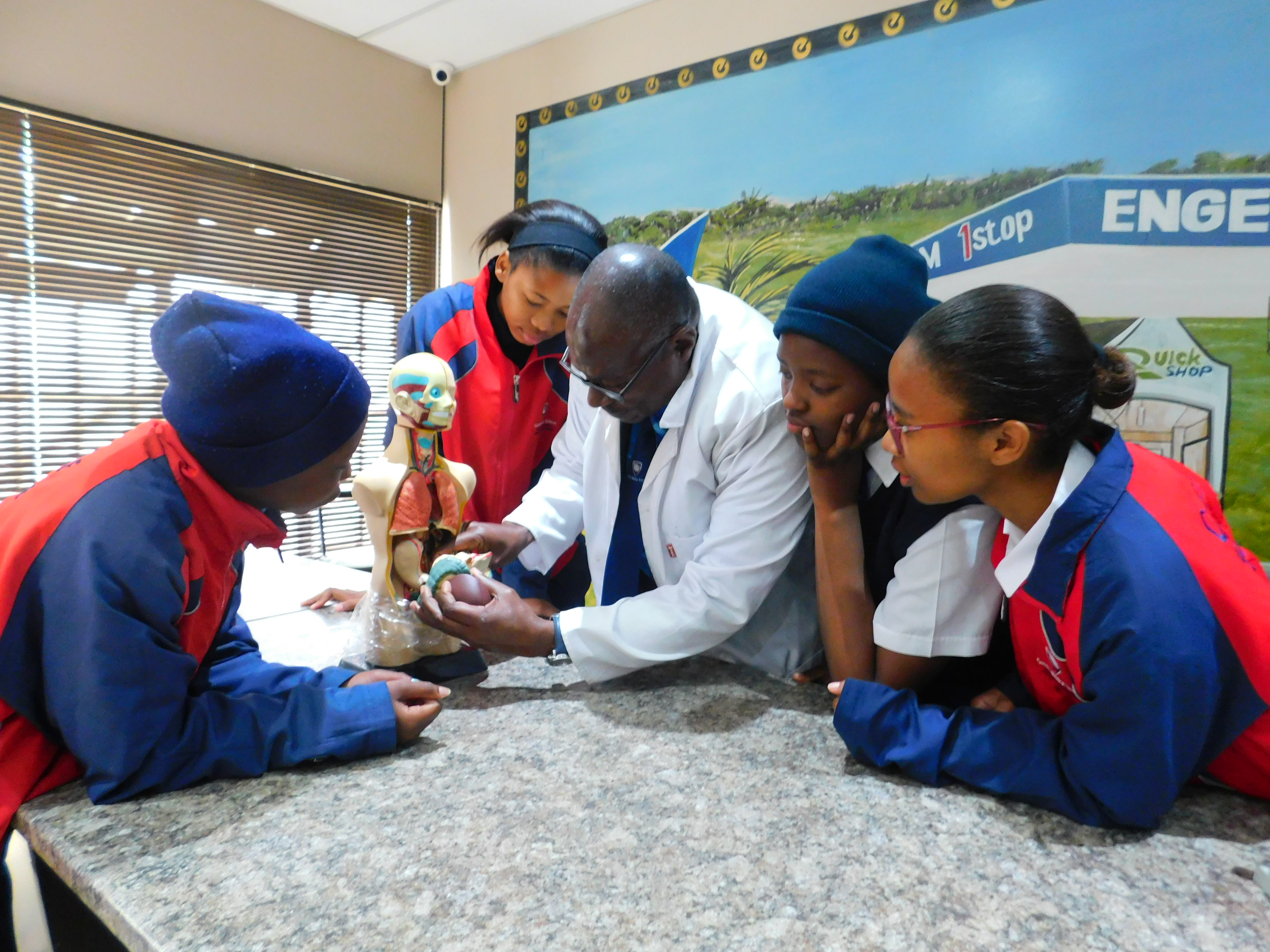
A medical professional shows students a model of human anatomy. People with higher status, like this instructor, command more attention, are more influential, and their statements are evaluated as more accurate, compared to others in the group.

Because status is always relative to others, a person may enter many situations throughout their life or even a single day in which they hold high, equal, or low status depending on who is around them. For instance, a doctor holds high status when interacting with a patient, equal status in a meeting with fellow doctors, and low status when meeting with their hospital's chief of medicine. A person can also be a 'big fish in a small pond' such that they have higher status than everyone else in their organization, but low or equal status relative to professionals in their entire field.

Some perspectives on status emphasize its relatively fixed and fluid aspects. Ascribed statuses are fixed for an individual at birth, while achieved status is determined by social rewards an individual acquires during their lifetime as a result of the exercise of ability and/or perseverance. Examples of ascribed status include castes, race, and beauty among others. Meanwhile, achieved statuses are akin to one's educational credentials or occupation: these things require a person to exercise effort and often undergo years of training. The term master status has been used to describe the status most important for determining a person's position in a given context, like possessing a mental illness.

However, the concept of a master status is controversial. Status characteristics theory argues members of a task group will listen to whomever they believe will most help them solve a problem. One's external status in society (e.g., race or gender) determines influence in small groups, but so does a person's known ability on the task (e.g., mechanical ability when a car breaks down). This implies that known ability would attenuate the effect of external status, implying a given external status characteristic is not a master status. The program of research finds characteristics assumed to be master statuses (e.g., mental illness) are, in fact, attenuated by known ability. Moreover, status affects group members' assertiveness only when characteristics differentiate group members (i.e., groups are mixed-race or mixed-gender). With respect to gender, experimental tests repeatedly found that women are highly deferential only in the presence of men. Although for disadvantaged groups, status disadvantage is not completely negated by valued characteristics, their social status does not depend predominantly on any one group membership. As such, status characteristics research has yet to identify a social characteristic that operates like a robust cross-situational master status.

== Uses of status ==
Although a person's status does not always correspond to merit or actual ability, it does allow the members of a group to coordinate their actions and quickly agree on who among them should be listened to. When actual ability does correspond to status, then status hierarchies can be especially useful. They allow leaders to emerge who set informed precedents and influence less knowledgeable group members, allowing groups to use the shared information of their group to make more correct decisions. This can be especially helpful in novel situations where group members must determine who is best equipped to complete a task.

In addition, groups accord more respect and esteem to members who help them succeed, which encourages highly capable members to contribute in the first place. This helps groups motivate members to contribute to a collective good by offering respect and esteem as a kind of compensation for helping everyone in the group succeed. For instance, people recognized as achieving great feats for their group or society are sometimes accorded legendary status as heroes.

Finally—for good or ill—status maintains social inequality. Because status is based on beliefs about social worth and esteem, sociologists argue it can then appear only natural that higher-status people have more material resources and power. Status makes it appear that a person's rank or position in society is due to their relative merit, and therefore deserved. For instance, if a society holds that the homeless are unworthy of respect or dignity, then their poor material conditions are not evaluated as unjust by members of that society, and therefore are not subject to change.

== In different societies ==
Whether formal or informal, status hierarchies are present in all societies. In a society, the relative honor and prestige accorded to individuals depends on how well an individual is perceived to match a society's values and ideals (e.g., being pious in a religious society or wealthy in a capitalist society). Status often comes with attendant rights, duties, and lifestyle practices.

In modern societies, occupation is usually thought of as the main determinant of status, but other memberships or affiliations (such as ethnic group, religion, gender, voluntary associations, fandom, hobby) can have an influence. Achieved status, when people are placed in the stratification structure based on their individual merits or achievements like education or training, is thought to be reflective of modern developed societies. Consequently, achieved status implies that social mobility in a society is possible, as opposed to caste systems characterized by immobility based solely on ascribed status.

In pre-modern societies, status differentiation is widely varied. In some cases it can be quite rigid, such as with the Indian caste system. In other cases, status exists without class or informally, as is true with some hunter-gatherer societies such as the Khoisan, and some Indigenous Australian societies. In these cases, status is limited to specific personal relationships. For example, a Khoisan man is expected to take his wife's mother quite seriously (a non-joking relationship), although the mother-in-law has no special "status" over anyone except her son-in-law—and only then in specific contexts.

Status maintains and stabilizes social stratification. Mere inequality in resources and privileges is perceived as unfair and thus prompts retaliation and resistance from those of lower status, but if some individuals are seen as better than others (i.e., have higher status), then it seems natural and fair that high-status people receive more resources and privileges. Historically, Max Weber distinguished status from social class, though some contemporary empirical sociologists combine the two ideas to create socioeconomic status or SES, usually operationalized as a simple index of income, education and occupational prestige.

== In nonhuman animals ==
Social status hierarchies have been documented in a wide range of animals: apes, baboons, wolves, cows/bulls, hens, even fish, and ants. Natural selection produces status-seeking behavior because animals tend to have more surviving offspring when they raise their status in their social group. Such behaviors vary widely because they are adaptations to a wide range of environmental niches. Some social dominance behaviors tend to increase reproductive opportunity, while others tend to raise the survival rates of an individual's offspring. Neurochemicals, particularly serotonin, prompt social dominance behaviors without need for an organism to have abstract conceptualizations of status as a means to an end. Social dominance hierarchy emerges from individual survival-seeking behaviors.

== Status inconsistency ==
Status inconsistency is a situation where an individual's social positions have both positive and negative influences on his or her social status. For example, a teacher may have a positive societal image (respect, prestige) which increases their status but may earn little money, which simultaneously decreases their status. In task-focused interpersonal encounters, people unconsciously combine this information to develop impressions of their own and others' relative rank. At one time, researchers thought status inconsistency would be a source of stress, though evidence for this hypothesis proved inconsistent, leaving some to conclude conflicting expectations through occupying incompatible roles may be the true stressor.

== Social stratification ==
Status is one of the major components of social stratification, the way people are hierarchically placed in a society. The members of a group with similar status interact mainly within their own group and to a lesser degree with those of higher or lower status in a recognized system of social stratification. Although the determinants of status are specific to different cultures, some of the more common bases for status-based stratification include:

- Wealth/Income
- Gender
- Race/Ethnicity
- Social class
- Occupation
- Popularity (also called sociometric status)
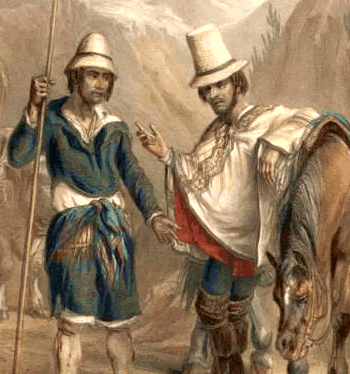
  Social status is often associated with clothing and possessions. Compare the foreman with a horse and high hat with the inquilino in picture. Image from 19th century rural Chile.

== Max Weber's three dimensions of stratification ==
The German sociologist Max Weber argued stratification is based on three factors: property, status, and power. He claimed that social stratification is a result of the interaction of wealth (class), prestige status (or in German Stand) and power (party).

- Property refers to one's material possessions. If someone has control of property, that person has power over others and can use the property to his or her own benefit.
- Status refers to a person's relative level of respectability and social honor. Weber's interest was particularly in status groups, which have distinct cultural dispositions and privileges, and whose members mostly socialize with one another.
- Power is the ability to do what one wants, regardless of the will of others. (Domination, a closely related concept, is the power to make others' behavior conform to one's commands).

=== Status group ===
Max Weber developed the idea of "status group" which is a translation of the German Stand (pl. Stände). Status groups are communities that are based on ideas of lifestyles and the honor the status group both asserts, and is given by others. Status groups exist in the context of beliefs about relative prestige, privilege, and honor. People in status groups are only supposed to engage with people of like status, and in particular, marriage inside or outside the group is discouraged. Status groups in some societies include professions, club-like organizations, ethnicity, race, and any other socially (de)valued group that organizes interaction among relative equals.

== See also ==
- Achieved status – Social position achieved by actions
- Ascribed status – Concept in sociology and anthropology
- Belongingness – Human emotional need
- Dominance hierarchy – Type of socially subordinate ranking
- Economic mobility – Ability to improve one's economic status
- Identity performance – How persons present themselves in social interactions
- In-group and out-group – Sociological notions
- Occupational prestige – Public perception of an individual's job
- Positional good – Goods whose value is given by desirability rather than quantity
- Power (social and political) – Ability to influence the behaviour of others
- Ranked society – Society that ranks individuals by relation to chief
- Reputation – Social opinion about an entity
- Social class – Hierarchical stratification of societies
- Social inequality
- Social stratification – Concept in sociology
- Socioeconomic status – Economic and social measure of a person's affluence and/or influence
- Sociometric status – Concept in sociology
- Status attainment – Process by which individuals achieve their positions within society
- Status set – Term in sociology
- Status symbol – Object that denotes one's social position
