= Ralph Linton =

American anthropologist

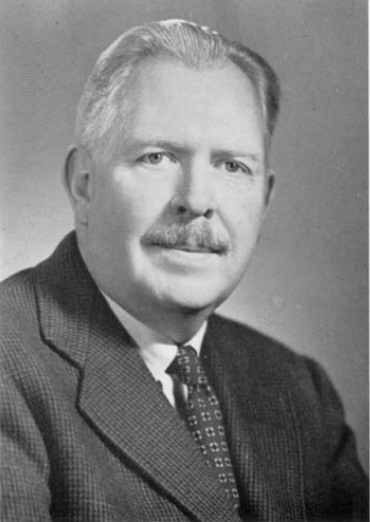
- Frontispiece of 1958's Ralph Linton, 1893–1953: A Biographical Memoir
- Born: February 27, 1893; Philadelphia, Pennsylvania, U.S.
- Died: December 24, 1953 (aged 60); New Haven, Connecticut, U.S.
- Education: Swarthmore College; University of Pennsylvania; Columbia University
- Known for: The Study of Man (1936); The Tree of Culture (1955)
- Awards: Viking Fund Medal (1951)
- Scientific career
- Fields: Cultural anthropology
- Workplaces: Field Museum, University of Wisconsin–Madison, Columbia University, Yale University

Ralph Linton (27 February 1893 – 24 December 1953) was an American anthropologist of the mid-20th century, particularly remembered for his texts The Study of Man (1936) and The Tree of Culture (1955). One of Linton's major contributions to anthropology was defining a distinction between status and role.

== Early life and education ==
Linton was born into a family of Quaker restaurant entrepreneurs in Philadelphia in 1893 and entered Swarthmore College in 1911. He was an indifferent student and resisted his father's pressures to prepare himself for the life of a professional. He grew interested in archaeology after participating in a field school in the southwest and took a year off of his studies to participate in another archaeological excavation at Quiriguá in Guatemala. Having found a strong focus he graduated Phi Beta Kappa in 1915.

Although Linton became a prominent anthropologist, his graduate education took place largely at the periphery of the discipline. He attended the University of Pennsylvania, where he earned his master's degree studying with Frank Speck while undertaking additional archaeological field work in New Jersey and New Mexico.

He was admitted to a Ph.D. program at Columbia University thereafter, but did not become close to Franz Boas, the doyen of anthropology in that era. When America entered World War I, Linton enlisted and served in France during 1917–1919 with Battery D, 149th Field Artillery, 42nd (Rainbow) Division. Linton served as a corporal and saw battle at the trenches, experiencing first hand a German gas attack. Linton's military experience would be a major influence on his subsequent work. One of his first published articles was "Totemism and the A.E.F." (Published in American Anthropologist vol. 26:294–300)", in which he argued that the way in which military units often identified with their symbols could be considered a kind of totemism.

His military fervor probably did not do anything to improve his relationship with the pacifist Franz Boas, who abhorred all displays of nationalism or jingoism. An anecdote has it that Linton was rebuked by Boas when he appeared in class in his military uniform. Whatever the cause, shortly after his return to the United States, he transferred from Columbia to Harvard, where he studied with Earnest Hooton, Alfred Tozzer, and Roland Dixon.

After a year of classes at Harvard, Linton proceeded to do more fieldwork, first at Mesa Verde and then as a member of the Bayard Dominick Expedition led by E.S.C. Handy under the auspices of the Bishop Museum to the Marquesas.

While in the Pacific, his focus shifted from archaeology to cultural anthropology, although he would retain a keen interest in material culture and 'primitive' art throughout his life. He returned from the Marquesas in 1922 and eventually received his Ph.D. from Harvard in 1925.

== Academic career ==
Linton used his Harvard connections to secure a position at the Field Museum of Chicago after his return from the Marquesas. His official position was as Curator of American Indian materials. He continued working on digs in Ohio which he had first begun as a graduate student, but also began working through the museum's archival material on the Pawnee and published data collected by others in a series of articles and museum bulletins. While at the Field Museum he worked with illustrator and future children's book artist and author Holling Clancy Holling.

Between 1925 and 1927, Linton undertook an extensive collecting trip to Madagascar for the field museum, exploring the western end of the Austronesian diaspora after having studied the eastern end of this culture in the Marquesas. He did his own fieldwork there as well, and the book that resulted, The Tanala: A Hill Tribe of Madagascar (1933), was the most detailed ethnography he would publish.

On his return to the United States, Linton took a position at the University of Wisconsin–Madison, where the Department of Sociology had expanded to include an anthropology unit. Linton thus served as the first member of what would later become a separate department. Several of his students went on to become important anthropologists, such as Clyde Kluckhohn, Marvin Opler, Philleo Nash, and Sol Tax. Up to this point, Linton had been primarily a researcher in a rather romantic vein, and his years at Wisconsin were the period in which he developed his ability to teach and publish as a theoretician. This fact, combined with his penchant for popular writing and his intellectual encounter with Radcliffe-Brown (then at the University of Chicago), led to the publication of his textbook The Study of Man (1936). It was also during this period that he married his third wife, Adelin Hohlfeld, who worked as his secretary and editor as well as his collaborator—many of the popular pieces published jointly by them (such as Halloween Through Twenty Centuries) were in fact entirely written by Adelin Hohlfield.

In 1937 Linton came to Columbia University, appointed to the post of head of the Anthropology department after the retirement of Franz Boas. The choice was opposed by most of Boas' students, with whom Linton had never been on good terms. The Boasians had expected Ruth Benedict to be the choice for Boas' successor. As head of the department Linton informed against Boas and many of his students to the FBI, accusing them of being communists. This led to some of them being fired and blacklisted, for example Gene Weltfish. Throughout his life Linton maintained an intense personal animosity against the Boasians, particularly against Ruth Benedict, and he was a fierce critic of the Culture and Personality approach. According to Sidney Mintz who was a colleague of Linton at Yale, he even once jokingly boasted that he had killed Benedict using a Tanala magic charm.

When World War II broke out, Linton became involved in war-planning and his thoughts on the war and the role of the United States (and American Anthropology) could be seen in several works of the post-war period, most notably The Science of Man in the World Crisis (1945) and Most of the World. It was during the war that Linton also undertook a long trip to South America, where he experienced a coronary occlusion that left him in precarious health.

After the war Linton moved to Yale University, a center for anthropologists such as G. P. Murdock who had collaborated with the US government. He taught there from 1946 to 1953, where he continued to publish on culture and personality. It was during this period that he also began writing The Tree of Culture, an ambitious global overview of human culture. Linton was elected a Fellow of the American Academy of Arts and Sciences in 1950. He died of complications relating to his trip in South America on Christmas Eve, 1953. His wife, Adelin Hohlfield Linton, completed The Tree of Culture which went on to become a popular textbook.

== Work ==
The Study of Man established Linton as one of anthropology's premier theorists, particularly amongst sociologists who worked outside of the Boasian mainstream. In this work he developed the concepts of status and role for describing the patterns of behavior in society. According to Linton, ascribed status is assigned to an individual without reference to their innate differences or abilities. Whereas achieved status is determined by an individual's performance or effort. Linton noted that while the definitions of the two concepts are clear and distinct, it is not always easy to identify whether an individual's status is ascribed or achieved. His perspective offers a deviation from the view that ascribed statuses are always fixed. For Linton a role is the set of behaviors associated with a status, and performing the role by doing the associated behaviors is the way in which a status is inhabited.

Throughout this early period Linton became interested in the problem of acculturation, working with Robert Redfield and Melville Herskovits on a prestigious Social Science Research Council subcommittee of the Committee on Personality and Culture. The result was a seminal jointly-authored piece entitled Memorandum for the Study of Acculturation (1936). Linton also obtained money from the Works Progress Administration for students to produce work which studied acculturation. The volume Acculturation in Seven American Indian Tribes is an example of the work in this period, and Linton's contributions to the volume remain his most influential writings on acculturation. Linton's interest in culture and personality also expressed itself in the form of a seminar he organized with Abram Kardiner at the New York Psychoanalytic Institute.
