= Label (sociology) =

A label is an abstract concept in sociology used to group people together based on perceived or held identity. Labels are a mode of identifying social groups. Labels can create a sense of community within groups, but they can also cause harm when used to separate individuals and groups from mainstream society. Individuals may choose a label, or they may be assigned one by others. The act of labeling may affect an individual's behavior and their reactions to the social world.

Symbolic interactionism and labeling theory both examine labels as a social concept, and emphasize the social weight of labels and labeling. Symbolic interactionism focuses on expectations of social roles, while labeling theory focuses on the social and individual consequences of labeling. Both theories link between labels and contexts and maintain that their meanings are socially defined rather than universal.

== Usage ==
=== External labeling ===
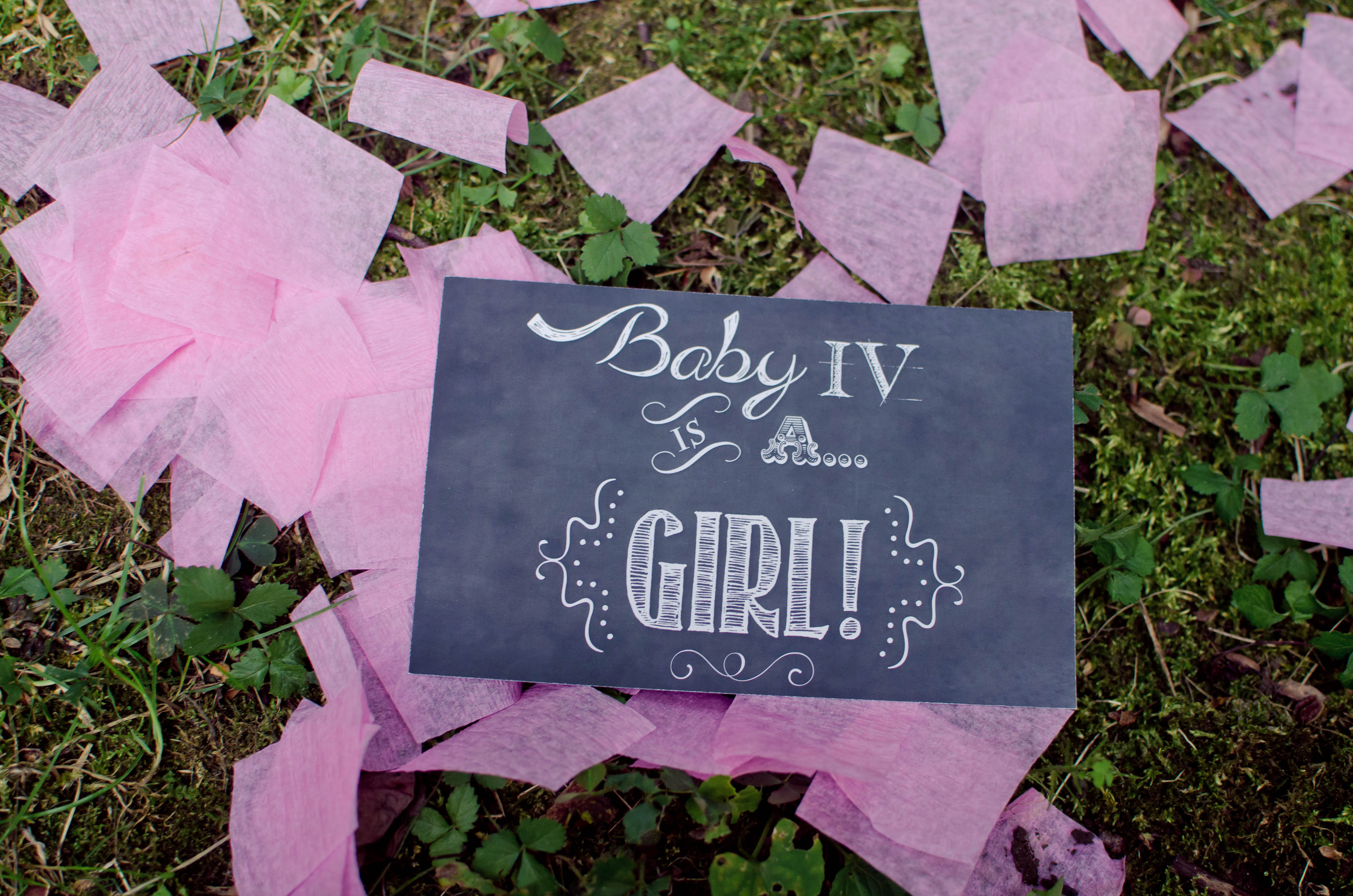
A sign stating "Baby IV is a…girl!"

Labels serve many functions in sociology. They group individuals with common characteristics, such as academic performance, gender, race, or adherence to law. Labels are a product of their social context, and may not be applicable outside their context. For example, a society without a formal legal system may not have the label "criminal", as there can be no stigmatization of crime in a society without laws.

Labels are also be used to differentiate between groups for negative reasons. A label may be placed on someone to designate them as different from mainstream society. This can result in in-group favoritism and othering. In-group favoritism occurs when individuals in one group (united by one label) favor members of their group above outsiders. Othering is a specific form of labeling in which the label produces patterns of power and privilege by designating those who do not follow accepted social norms as lesser. In some cases, othering can cause social exclusion, in which case groups labeled as "other" are denied full participation in society. Labels have been used to alienate groups and justify unequal power dynamics, which can harm the individual experiencing exclusion and alienation.

Some may rely on the use of stereotypes to assign labels. Unlike neutral categorization, stereotyping relies on power imbalances to reduce differences between individuals and groups to exaggerated characteristics. Although stereotypes may have no factual basis, they may alter an individual's behavior if consistently applied. Sociologist Robert K. Merton named this effect "self-fulfilling prophecy" to explain the change he observed. Both positive and negative labels may create a case of self-fulfilling prophecy. While the application of negative labels may cause discrimination and stigmatization, applying positive labels can also have negative effects on individuals like high expectations and discrimination. American sociologist Howard S. Becker emphasized that labels and labeling are not the sole factors in behavior, and must be considered among other factors. Becker claimed that certain labels may increase one's likelihood of aligning with expected behavior, but they do not fully predict action.

=== Internal labeling ===
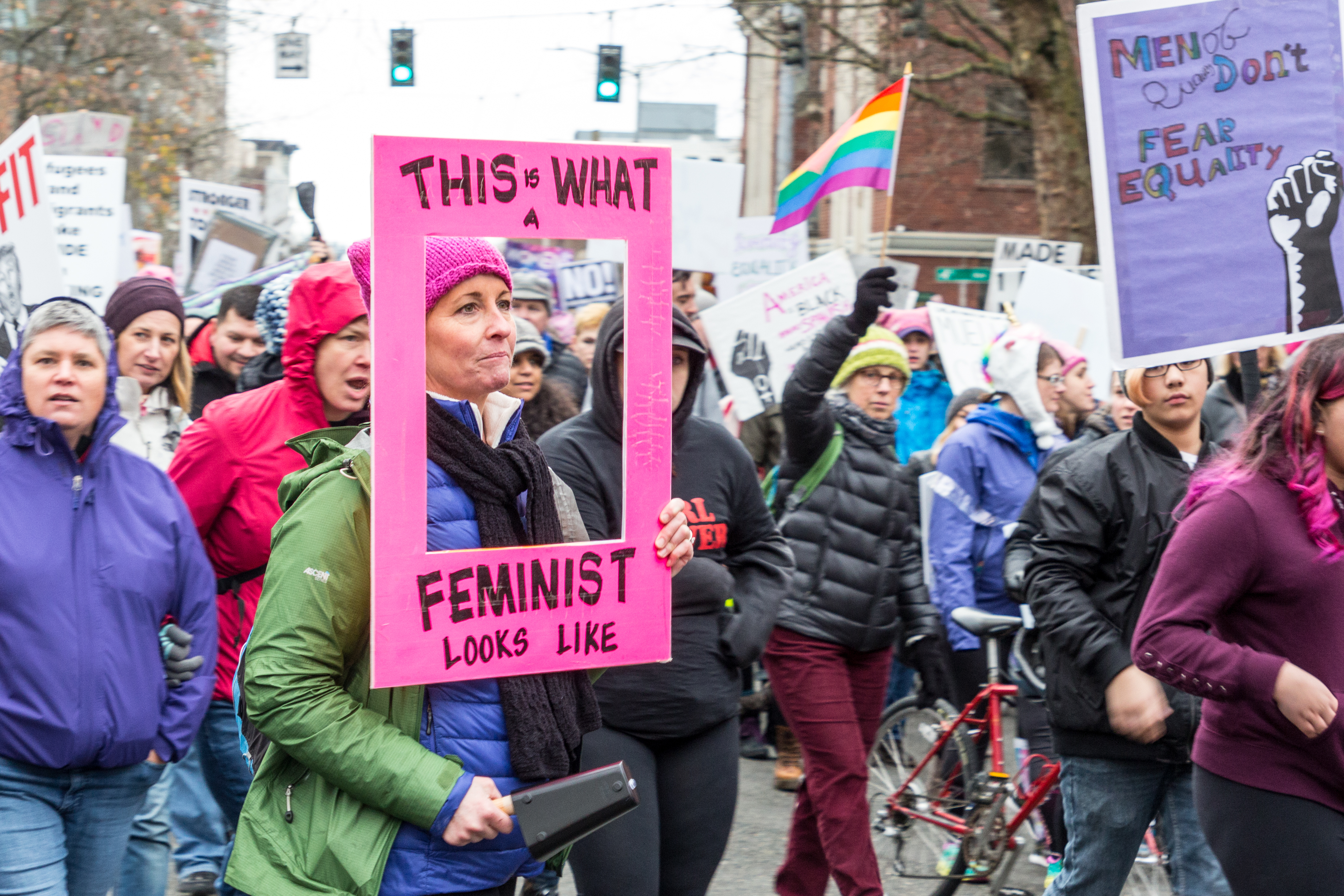
A member of a women's march holds up a sign reading "this is what a feminist looks like" to frame their face.

Individuals may choose a label to describe a certain aspect of themselves, and these labels may change over time. Labels can describe a certain facet of one's personality, or they may highlight certain achievements. Labeling one's self can amplify the role of the described behavior in their life, influencing them to conform to behaviors that are expected by those who are in the labeled group. Despite groups holding many positive qualities, others may perceive positive traits of a group to be inferior. This in turn can strengthen the group's association with their label and the actions and behaviors associated with them. Individuals can bond over shared interests and characteristics, leading to a sense of connection and community.

Labels are not restricted to changeable aspects of one's self, but may be used to describe foundational aspects of one's identity, including race, gender, and sexuality. Communities that share labels may have similar experiences that bind individuals to a group identity. Groups may also choose to label themselves in order to separate themselves from mainstream society, setting themselves apart as superior to those who follow the norm. Labels may function not only to say what a group is, but to say what the group is not. George Herbert Mead explained that positioning a group in opposition to a common enemy is "the easiest way of getting together". He further claims that values are strengthened and validated when aligned with the values of a group. Groups can be united in many ways, including shared experiences, common identity, shared values, or a common enemy.

== Theory ==
=== Symbolic interactionism ===
Symbolic interactionism is a sociological theory that examines the role of symbols in communication and interaction. Symbolic interactionism is mainly concerned with smaller groups and interactions between individuals. This theory looks at the construction of symbolic meanings and their use in social contexts. A symbol can be anything from a picture to a word, to a common set of values. Social roles hold symbolic meaning and can define what expectations are placed on individuals. The concept of social roles are closely tied to the concept of labels. Social roles come with expected behaviors that can help situate people in unfamiliar contexts by providing a framework they can use to interpret the meanings behind actions. For example, offering a tip to a waiter in a restaurant has a different symbolic meaning as offering a tip to an airline worker. Social context determines whether an action is normative or irregular. Symbolic interactionism and its examination of social roles is the theoretical basis for labeling theory. Symbolic interactionism preceded the creation of labeling theory, which drew heavily upon the work of symbolic interactionism.

=== Labeling theory ===
Labeling theory is a sociological theory that claims labels have a profound impact on individuals. Labeling theory is closely connected with criminology, and examines conceptualizations of deviance. While labeling theory is not singularly focused on the study of crime, it uses "deviance" and "the criminal" to explain the effect of labels. Other labels are commonly researched under this theory, including "homosexual" and "mentally ill". Labeling theory emphasizes that labels do not necessarily represent inherent truths, but actions and behaviors that are responses to social constructions. "Deviance" is not a descriptor of a person, but the actions of an individual that defy social expectation. When individuals act in ways that defy their social roles, they may be labeled deviant. Becker maintains that the act is labeled as deviant, not the individual. When labels are tied to the individual, labeling theory claims that labels develop codes of morality that spur negative stereotypes and stigma. This theory presents labels and their social context as holding power and influence over lives, behavior, and relationships.

== See also ==
- Collective identity
- Criminalization
- Deviance (sociology)
- Discrimination
- Identity (social science)
- In-group favoritism
- Self-fulfilling prophecy
- Self-identity
- Social constructionism
- Social stigma
- Stereotype
