= Ascribed status =

Concept in sociology and anthropology

Ascribed status is a term used in sociology that refers to the social status of a person that is assigned at birth or assumed involuntarily later in life. The status is a position that is neither earned by the person nor chosen for them. It is given to them by either their society or group, leaving them little or no control over it. Rather, the ascribed status is assigned based on social and cultural expectations, norms, and standards. These positions are occupied regardless of efforts or desire. These rigid social designators remain fixed throughout an individual's life and are inseparable from the positive or negative stereotypes that are linked with one's ascribed statuses.

The practice of assigning such statuses to individuals exists cross-culturally within all societies and is based on gender, race, family origins, and ethnic backgrounds.

In contrast, an achieved status is a social position a person takes on voluntarily that reflects both personal ability and merit. An individual's occupation tends to fall under the category of an achieved status; for example, a teacher or a firefighter.

Individuals have control over their achieved statuses insofar as there are no restrictions associated with their ascribed statuses that could potentially hinder their social growth. Ascribed status plays an important role in societies because it can provide the members with a defined and unified identity. No matter where an individual's ascribed status may place him or her in the social hierarchy, most has a set of roles and expectations that are directly linked to each ascribed status and thus, provides a social personality.

== Factors ==
The various factors that determine ascribed status can be age (as in age stratification), kinship, sex, appearance, race, social group, gender, ability status, ethnicity, socioeconomic status, culture, or caste.

In addition to ascription, at birth there are also:

- Delayed ascription (when social status is given at a later stage of life)
- Fluid ascription (when ascribed status leads to an achieved status)

== Reversible and irreversible ==
The anthropologist Ralph Linton developed definitions for ascribed status and achieved status. According to Linton, ascribed status is assigned to an individual without reference to their innate differences or abilities. Achieved status is determined by an individual's performance or effort. Linton noted that while the definitions of the two concepts are clear and distinct, it is not always easy to identify whether an individual's status is ascribed or achieved. His perspective offers a deviation from the view that ascribed statuses are always fixed.

Religion is generally perceived as an ascribed status but for those individuals who choose a religion as an adult, or convert to another religion, their religion becomes an achieved status, based on Linton's definition. It is commonly perceived that ascribed statuses are irreversible while achieved statuses are reversible. Linton uses Leo Schnore's research to illustrate how ascribed statuses can be both irreversible and reversible. An example of an ascribed reversible status is the status of citizenship.

An example of ascribed irreversible status is age. His conclusion is based on the fact that an ascribed status within a social structure is indicative of the behavior that one can exhibit but it does not explain the action itself. Ascribed status is an arbitrary system of classifying individuals that is not fixed in the way that most people think.

Status is a social phenomenon rather than a biological one. The meaning is derived from the collection of expectations of how an individual should behave and what the expected treatment of that individual is. If an individual lies about a biological fact or social accomplishment and this lie remains undiscovered by others and is accepted by them, then in this social system, his status will be based on the lie. His status would not be based on a biological fact or social accomplishment.

Behavior toward the individual will be in accordance with the accepted lie. Consequently, behavior expected from that individual will also be in accordance with that accepted lie rather than the ascribed status that would be associated with him if the truth were known. The success of the structure requires that the expectations remain constant, even if they are illegitimately acquired, given that the truth is never discovered. This further highlights the arbitrariness of ascribed status because there is no biological basis or universal truth for assigning these societal rankings to individuals.

== Low self-esteem ==
There is a positive correlation between an individual's self-esteem and their ascribed status; for this purpose, self-esteem is defined as a liking and respect for oneself which has its basis in reality. Individuals with a low social status generally have a lower self-esteem. A negative image of oneself among individuals with lower ascribed statuses is the result of the internalization of the expectations that others have of them and the treatment that they receive based on those statuses. Additionally, labeling theory can play a role in ascribed status and self-esteem as well. Labeling theory is associated with the concepts of self-fulfilling prophecy and stereotyping and is a theory that states a person becomes what they are labeled. For example, when members in society can begin to treat individuals on the basis of their ascribed statuses, they "label" them, and the individuals begin to accept the labels themselves. In other words, an individual engages in a behavior that is deemed by others as inappropriate, others label that person to be deviant, and eventually the individual internalizes and accepts this label.

Juxtaposition of their own value systems against the larger society's view often leaves individuals of a lower status with low self-esteem without regard to the individual's actual capabilities. A negative self-image may stifle an individual's efforts to acquire a certain achieved status; this illustrates how a low ascribed status can result in a low achieved status.

== Religion ==
Wealth is not the only social characteristic that defines an individual's ascribed status. Religion is also a factor. If a person's family identifies with a particular religion, be it Christianity, Hinduism, Islam, etc., generally that person may be presumed to adopt the same religion as their biological or adopted parents. An individual's religion or absence of religion becomes a part of his or her ascribed status. The social norms of a particular religion may have different ascribed statuses than those given by the larger society because followers are ascribed status based on the religious doctrines that govern their belief.

Ascribed status can also be closely linked with master status, as they both involve what a person is born into. Master status is a broader term that includes more topics than ascribed status.

== Caste system ==
Castes are an example of a stratification structure based on ascribed status. Although each caste system works differently, generally everyone is born into a specific caste and the caste of the parents generally determines the status of their children, regardless of ability or merit. The ranks of a caste system might include:

- priests and scholars
- rulers, warriors and those concerned with defense and administration
- traders, merchants, and people involved in agricultural production
- laborers, servants
- those involved in animal slaughter or sewerage disposal

== See also ==
- Sex assignment
- Jewish disabilities
- Legal status
