= Sociological theory =

Theory advanced by social scientists to explain facts about the social world

A sociological theory is a supposition that intends to consider, analyze, and/or explain objects of social reality from a sociological perspective, drawing connections between individual concepts in order to organize and substantiate sociological knowledge. Hence, such knowledge is composed of complex theoretical frameworks and methodology. These theories range in scope, from concise, yet thorough, descriptions of a single social process to broad, inconclusive paradigms for analysis and interpretation. Some sociological theories are designed to explain specific aspects of the social world and allow for predictions about future events, while others serve as broad theoretical frameworks that guide further sociological analysis. Dynamic social theory is the hypothesis that institutions and patterns of behaviour are the social science equivalent of theories in the natural sciences because they embody a great deal of knowledge of how society works and act as social models that are replicated or adapted to achieve predictable outcomes.

Prominent sociological theorists include Talcott Parsons, Robert K. Merton, Randall Collins, James Samuel Coleman, Peter Blau, Niklas Luhmann, Immanuel Wallerstein, George Homans, Theda Skocpol, Gerhard Lenski, Pierre van den Berghe and Jonathan H. Turner.

== Sociological theory vs. social theory ==
Kenneth Allan (2006) distinguishes sociological theory from social theory, in that the former consists of abstract and testable propositions about society, heavily relying on the scientific method which aims for objectivity and to avoid passing value judgments. In contrast, social theory, according to Allan, focuses less on explanation and more on commentary and critique of modern society. As such, social theory is generally closer to continental philosophy insofar as it is less concerned with objectivity and derivation of testable propositions, thus more likely to propose normative judgments.

Sociologist Robert K. Merton (1949) argued that sociological theory deals with social mechanisms, which are essential in exemplifying the 'middle ground' between social law and description. Merton believed these social mechanisms to be "social processes having designated consequences for designated parts of the social structure."

Prominent social theorists include: Jürgen Habermas, Anthony Giddens, Michel Foucault, Dorothy Smith, Roberto Unger, Alfred Schütz, Jeffrey Alexander, and Jacques Derrida.

There are also prominent scholars who could be seen as being in-between social and sociological theories, such as: Harold Garfinkel, Herbert Blumer, Claude Lévi-Strauss, Pierre Bourdieu, and Erving Goffman.

== Classical theoretical traditions ==
The field of sociology itself is a relatively new discipline and so, by extension, is the field of sociological theory. Both date back to the 18th and 19th centuries, periods of drastic social change, where societies would begin to see, for example, the emergence of industrialization, urbanization, democracy, and early capitalism, provoking (particularly Western) thinkers to start becoming considerably more aware of society. As such, the field of sociology initially dealt with broad historical processes relating to these changes.

Through a well-cited survey of sociological theory, Randall Collins (1994) retroactively labels various theorists as belonging to four theoretical traditions: functionalism, conflict, symbolic interactionism, and utilitarianism.

While modern sociological theory descends predominately from functionalist (Durkheim) and conflict-oriented (Marx and Weber) perspectives of social structure, it also takes great influence from the symbolic interactionist tradition, accounting for theories of pragmatism (Mead, Cooley) and micro-level structure (Simmel). Likewise, utilitarian theories of rational choice (equivalent here to "social exchange theory"), although often associated with either ethics or economics, is an established tradition within sociological theory.

Lastly, as argued by Raewyn Connell (2007), a tradition that is often forgotten is that of social Darwinism, which applies the logic of biological evolution to the social world. This tradition often aligns with classical functionalism and is associated with several founders of sociology, primarily Herbert Spencer, Lester F. Ward and William Graham Sumner. Contemporary sociological theory retains traces of each of these traditions, which are by no means mutually exclusive.

=== Structural functionalism ===
A broad historical paradigm in sociology, structural functionalism addresses social structures in its entirety and in terms of the necessary functions possessed by its constituent elements. A common parallel used by functionalists, known as the organic or biological analogy (popularized by Herbert Spencer), is to regard norms and institutions as 'organs' that work toward the proper-functioning of the entire 'body' of society. The perspective was implicit in the original sociological positivism of Auguste Comte, but was theorized in full by Durkheim, again with respect to observable, structural laws.

Functionalism also has an anthropological basis in the work of theorists such as Marcel Mauss, Bronisław Malinowski, and Alfred Radcliffe-Brown, the latter of whom, through explicit usage, introduced the "structural" prefix to the concept. Classical functionalist theory is generally united by its tendency towards the biological analogy and notions of social evolutionism. As Giddens states: "Functionalist thought, from Comte onwards, has looked particularly towards biology as the science providing the closest and most compatible model for social science. Biology has been taken to provide a guide to conceptualizing the structure and the function of social systems and to analyzing processes of evolution via mechanisms of adaptation…functionalism strongly emphasizes the pre-eminence of the social world over its individual parts (i.e. its constituent actors, human subjects)."

=== Conflict theory ===
Conflict theory is a method that attempts, in a scientific manner, to provide causal explanations to the existence of conflict in society. Thus, conflict theorists look at the ways in which conflict arises and is resolved in society, as well as how every conflict is unique. Such theories describe that the origins of conflict in societies are founded in the unequal distribution of resources and power. Though there is no universal definition of what "resources" necessarily includes, most theorists follow Max Weber's point of view. Weber viewed conflict as the result of class, status, and power being ways of defining individuals in any given society. In this sense, power defines standards, thus people abide by societal rules and expectation due to an inequality of power.

Karl Marx is believed to be the father of social conflict theory, in which social conflict refers to the struggle between segments of society over valued resources. By the 19th century, a small population in the West had become capitalists: individuals who own and operate factories and other businesses in pursuit of profits, owning virtually all large-scale means of production. However, theorists believe that capitalism turned most other people into industrial workers, or, in Marx's terms, proletarians: individuals who, because of the structure of capitalist economies, must sell their labor for wages. It is through this notion that conflict theories challenge historically dominant ideologies, drawing attention to such power differentials as class, gender and race. Conflict theory is therefore a macrosociological approach, in which society is interpreted as an arena of inequality that generates conflict and social change.

Other important sociologists associated with social conflict theory include Harriet Martineau, Jane Addams, and W. E. B. Du Bois. Rather than observing the ways in which social structures help societies to operate, this sociological approach looks at how "social patterns" cause certain individuals to become dominant in society, while causing others to be oppressed. Accordingly, some criticisms to this theory are that it disregards how shared values and the way in which people rely on each other help to unify society.

=== Symbolic interactionism ===
Symbolic interaction—often associated with interactionism, phenomenological sociology, dramaturgy (sociology), and interpretivism—is a sociological approach that places emphasis on subjective meanings and, usually through analysis, on the empirical unfolding of social processes. Such processes are believed to rely on individuals and their actions, which is ultimately necessary for society to exists. This phenomenon was first theorized by George Herbert Mead who described it as the outcome of collaborative joint action.

The approach focuses on creating a theoretical framework that observes society as the product of everyday interactions of individuals. In other words, society in its most basic form is nothing more than the shared reality constructed by individuals as they interact with one another. In this sense, individuals interact within countless situations through symbolic interpretations of their given reality, whereby society is a complex, ever-changing mosaic of subjective meanings. Some critics of this approach argue that it focuses only on ostensible characteristics of social situations while disregarding the effects of culture, race, or gender (i.e. social-historical structures).

Important sociologists traditionally associated with this approach include George Herbert Mead, Herbert Blumer, and Erving Goffman. New contributions to the perspective, meanwhile, include those of Howard Becker, Gary Alan Fine, David Altheide, Robert Prus, Peter M. Hall, David R. Maines, as well as others. It is also in this tradition that the radical-empirical approach of ethnomethodology emerged from the work of Harold Garfinkel.

=== Utilitarianism ===
Utilitarianism is often referred to as exchange theory or rational choice theory in the context of sociology. This tradition tends to privilege the agency of individual rational actors, assuming that, within interactions, individuals always seek to maximize their own self-interest. As argued by Josh Whitford (2002), rational actors can be characterized as possessing four basic elements:

1. "a knowledge of alternatives;"
2. "a knowledge of, or beliefs about the consequences of the various alternatives;"
3. "an ordering of preferences over outcomes;" and
4. "a decision rule, to select amongst the possible alternatives."

Exchange theory is specifically attributed to the work of George C. Homans, Peter Blau, and Richard Emerson. Organizational sociologists James G. March and Herbert A. Simon noted that an individual's rationality is bounded by the context or organizational setting. The utilitarian perspective in sociology was, most notably, revitalized in the late 20th century by the work of former ASA president James Samuel Coleman.

== Basic theory ==
Overall, there is a strong consensus regarding the central theoretical questions and the key problems that emerge from explicating such questions in sociology. In general, sociological theory attempts to answer the following three questions: (1) What is action?; (2) What is social order?; and (3) What determines social change?

In the myriad of attempts to answer these questions, three predominantly theoretical (i.e. not empirical) issues emerge, largely inherited from classical theoretical traditions. The consensus on the central theoretical problems is how to link, transcend or cope with the following "big three" dichotomies:

1. Subjectivity and objectivity: deals with knowledge.
2. Structure and agency: deals with agency.
3. Synchrony and diachrony: deals with time.

Lastly, sociological theory often grapples with a subset of all three central problems through the problem of integrating or transcending the divide between micro-, meso- and macro-level social phenomena. These problems are not altogether empirical. Rather, they are epistemological: they arise from the conceptual imagery and analytical analogies that sociologists use to describe the complexity of social processes.

=== Objectivity and subjectivity ===
The issue of subjectivity and objectivity can be divided into a concern over (a) the general possibilities of social actions; and (b) the specific problem of social scientific knowledge. In regard to the former, the subjective is often equated (though not necessarily) with "the individual" and the individual's intentions and interpretations of the "objective". The objective, on the other hand, is usually considered to be any public/external action or outcome, on up to society writ large.

A primary question for social theorists is how knowledge reproduces along the chain of subjective-objective-subjective. That is to say, how is intersubjectivity achieved? While, historically, qualitative methods have attempted to tease out subjective interpretations, quantitative survey methods also attempt to capture individual subjectivities. Moreover, some qualitative methods take a radical approach to objective description in situ.

Insofar as subjectivity & objectivity are concerned with (b) the specific problem of social scientific knowledge, such concern results from the fact that a sociologist is part of the very object they seek to explain, as expressed by Bourdieu:

How can the sociologist effect in practice this radical doubting which is indispensable for bracketing all the presuppositions inherent in the fact that she is a social being, that she is therefore socialized and led to feel "like a fish in water" within that social world whose structures she has internalized? How can she prevent the social world itself from carrying out the construction of the object, in a sense, through her, through these unself-conscious operations or operations unaware of themselves of which she is the apparent subject

— Pierre Bourdieu, "The Problem of Reflexive Sociology", An Invitation to Reflexive Sociology (1992), p. 235

=== Structure and agency ===
Structure and agency (or determinism and voluntarism) form an enduring ontological debate in social theory: "Do social structures determine an individual's behaviour or does human agency?" In this context, agency refers to the capacity of an individual to act independently and make free choices, whereas structure relates to factors that limit or affect the choices and actions of the individual (e.g. social class, religion, gender, ethnicity, etc.).

Discussions over the primacy of either structure and agency relate to the core of sociological ontology, i.e. "what is the social world made of?", "what is a cause in the social world", and "what is an effect?". A perennial question within this debate is that of "social reproduction": how are structures (specifically structures that produce inequality) reproduced through the choices of individuals?

=== Synchrony and diachrony ===
Synchrony and diachrony (or statics and dynamics) within social theory are terms that refer to a distinction emerging out of the work of Levi-Strauss who inherited it from the linguistics of Ferdinand de Saussure. The former slices moments of time for analysis, thus it is an analysis of static social reality. Diachrony, on the other hand, attempts to analyze dynamic sequences. Following Saussure, synchrony would describe social phenomena at a specific point of time, while diachrony would refer to unfolding processes in time. In Anthony Giddens' introduction to Central Problems in Social Theory, he states that, "in order to show the interdependence of action and structure...we must grasp the time space relations inherent in the constitution of all social interaction." And like structure and agency, time is integral to discussion of social reproduction. In terms of sociology, historical sociology is often better positioned to analyze social life as diachronic, while survey research takes a snapshot of social life and is thus better equipped to understand social life as synchronic. Some argue that the synchrony of social structure is a methodological perspective rather than an ontological claim. Nonetheless, the problem for theory is how to integrate the two manners of recording and thinking about social data.

== Contemporary theories ==
The contemporary discipline of sociology is theoretically multi-paradigmatic, encompassing a greater range of subjects, including communities, organizations, and relationships, than when the discipline first began.

=== Strain theory / Anomie theory ===
Strain theory is a theoretical perspective that identifies anomie (i.e. normlessness) as the result of a society that provides little moral guidance to individuals.

Emile Durkheim (1893) first described anomie as one of the results of an inequitable division of labour within a society, observing that social periods of disruption resulted in greater anomie and higher rates of suicide and crimes. In this sense, broadly speaking, during times of great upheaval, increasing numbers of individuals "cease to accept the moral legitimacy of society," as noted by sociologist Anthony R. Mawson (1970).

Robert K. Merton would go on to theorize that anomie, as well as some forms of deviant behavior, derive largely from a disjunction between "culturally prescribed aspirations" of a society and "socially structured avenues for realizing those aspirations."

=== Dramaturgy ===
Developed by Erving Goffman, (Note: Erving Goffman publications indexed by Google Scholar.) dramaturgy (aka dramaturgical perspective) is a particularized paradigm of symbolic interactionism that interprets life to be a performance (i.e. a drama). As "actors," we have a status, i.e. the part that we play, by which we are given various roles. These roles serve as a script, supplying dialogue and action for the characters (i.e. the people in reality). Roles also involve props and certain settings. For example, a doctor (the role), uses instruments like a heart monitor (the prop), all the while using medical terms (the script), while in their doctor's office (the setting).

In addition, our performance is the "presentation of self," which is how people perceive us, based on the ways in which we portray ourselves. This process, known as impression management, begins with the idea of personal performance.

=== Mathematical theory ===
Mathematical theory (aka formal theory) refers to the use of mathematics in constructing social theories. Mathematical sociology aims to sociological theory in formal terms, which such theories can be understood to lack. The benefits of this approach not only include increased clarity, but also, through mathematics, the ability to derive theoretical implications that could not be arrived at intuitively. As such, models typically used in mathematical sociology allow sociologists to understand how predictable local interactions are often able to elicit global patterns of social structure.

=== Positivism ===
Positivism is a philosophy, developed in the middle of the 19th century by Auguste Comte, that states that the only authentic knowledge is scientific knowledge, and that such knowledge can only come from positive affirmation of theories through a strict scientific method. Society operates according to laws just like the physical world, thus introspective or intuitional attempts to gain knowledge are rejected. The positivist approach has been a recurrent theme in the history of western thought, from antiquity to the present day.

=== Postmodernism ===
Postmodernism, adhering to anti-theory and anti-method, believes that, due to human subjectivity, discovering objective truth is impossible or unachievable. In essence, the postmodernist perspective is one that exists as a counter to modernist thought, especially through its mistrust in grand theories and ideologies

The objective truth that is touted by modernist theory is believed by postmodernists to be impossible due to the ever-changing nature of society, whereby truth is also constantly subject to change. A postmodernists purpose, therefore, is to achieve understanding through observation, rather than data collection, using both micro and macro level analyses.

Questions that are asked by this approach include: "How do we understand societies or interpersonal relations, while rejecting the theories and methods of the social sciences, and our assumptions about human nature?" and "How does power permeate social relations or society, and change with the circumstances?" One of the most prominent postmodernists in the approach's history is the French philosopher Michel Foucault. (Note: See: Michel Foucault publications indexed by Google Scholar; and Michel Foucault bibliography.)

=== Other theories ===
- Antipositivism (or Interpretive sociology) is a theoretical perspective based on the work of Max Weber, proposes that social, economic and historical research can never be fully empirical or descriptive as one must always approach it with a conceptual apparatus.
- Critical theory is a lineage of sociological theory, with reference to such groups as the Frankfurt School, that aims to critique and change society and culture, not simply to document and understand it.
- Engaged theory is an approach that seeks to understand the complexity of social life through synthesizing empirical research with more abstract layers of analysis, including analysis of modes of practice, and analysis of basic categories of existence such a time, space, embodiment, and knowledge.
- Feminism is a collection of movements aimed at defining, establishing, and defending equal political, economic, and social rights for women. The theory focuses on how gender inequality shapes social life. This approach shows how sexuality both reflects patterns of social inequality and helps to perpetuate them. Feminism, from a social conflict perspective, focuses on gender inequality and links sexuality to the domination of women by men.
  - Intersectionality is a sociological framework used to analyze how individuals' and groups' social and political identities combine to produce unique experiences of discrimination and privilege. This approach expands upon the perspectives of first- and second-wave feminism, which primarily focused on the experiences of white, middle-class women, by incorporating the distinct experiences of women of color, economically disadvantaged women, immigrant women, and other marginalized groups.
- Field theory examines social fields, which are social environments in which competition takes place (e.g., the field of electronics manufacturers). It is concerned with how individuals construct such fields, with how the fields are structured, and with the effects the field has on people occupying different positions in it.
- Grounded theory is a systematic methodology in the social sciences involving the generation of theory from data. With a largely qualitative method, the goal of this approach is to discover and analyze data through comparative analyses, though it is quite flexible in its use of techniques.
- Middle-range theory is an approach to sociological theorizing aimed at integrating theory and empirical research. It is currently the de facto dominant approach to sociological theory construction, especially in the United States. Middle range theory starts with an empirical phenomenon (as opposed to a broad abstract entity like the social system) and abstracts from it to create general statements that can be verified by data.
- Network theory is a structural approach to sociology that is most closely associated with the work of Harrison White, who views norms and behaviors as embedded in chains of social relations.
- Phenomenology is an approach within the field of sociology that aims to reveal what role human awareness plays in the production of social action, social situations and social worlds. In essence, phenomenology is the belief that society is a human construction. The social phenomenology of Alfred Schütz influenced the development of the social constructionism and ethnomethodology. It was originally developed by Edmund Husserl.
- Postcolonialism is a postmodern approach that consists of the reactions to and the analysis of colonialism. (Note: See: Said, Edward. 1978. Orientalism. New York: Pantheon. ISBN 978-0394428147.)
- Pure sociology is a theoretical paradigm, developed by Donald Black, that explains variation in social life through social geometry, meaning through locations in social space. A recent extension of this idea is that fluctuations in social space—i.e., social time—are the cause of social conflict.
- Rational choice theory models social behavior as the interaction of utility maximizing individuals. "Rational" implies cost-effectiveness is balanced against cost to accomplish a utility maximizing interaction. Costs are extrinsic, meaning intrinsic values such as feelings of guilt will not be accounted for in the cost to commit a crime.
- Social constructionism is a sociological theory of knowledge that considers how social phenomena develop in particular social contexts.
  - Thomas theorem refers to situations that are defined as real are real in their consequences. Suggests that the reality people construct in their interaction has real consequences for the future. For example, a teacher who believes a certain student to be intellectually gifted may well encourage exceptional academic performance.
- Socialization refers to the lifelong social experience by which people develop their human potential and learn culture. Unlike other living species, humans need socialization within their cultures for survival. Adopting this concept, theorists may seek to understand the means by which human infants begin to acquire the skills necessary to perform as a functional member of their society
- Social exchange theory proposes that interactions that occurs between people can be partly based on what can be gained or lost by being with others. For example, when people think about who they may date, they'll look to see if the other person will offer just as much (or perhaps more) than they do. This can include judging an individual's looks and appearance, or their social status.

=== Theories of social movements ===
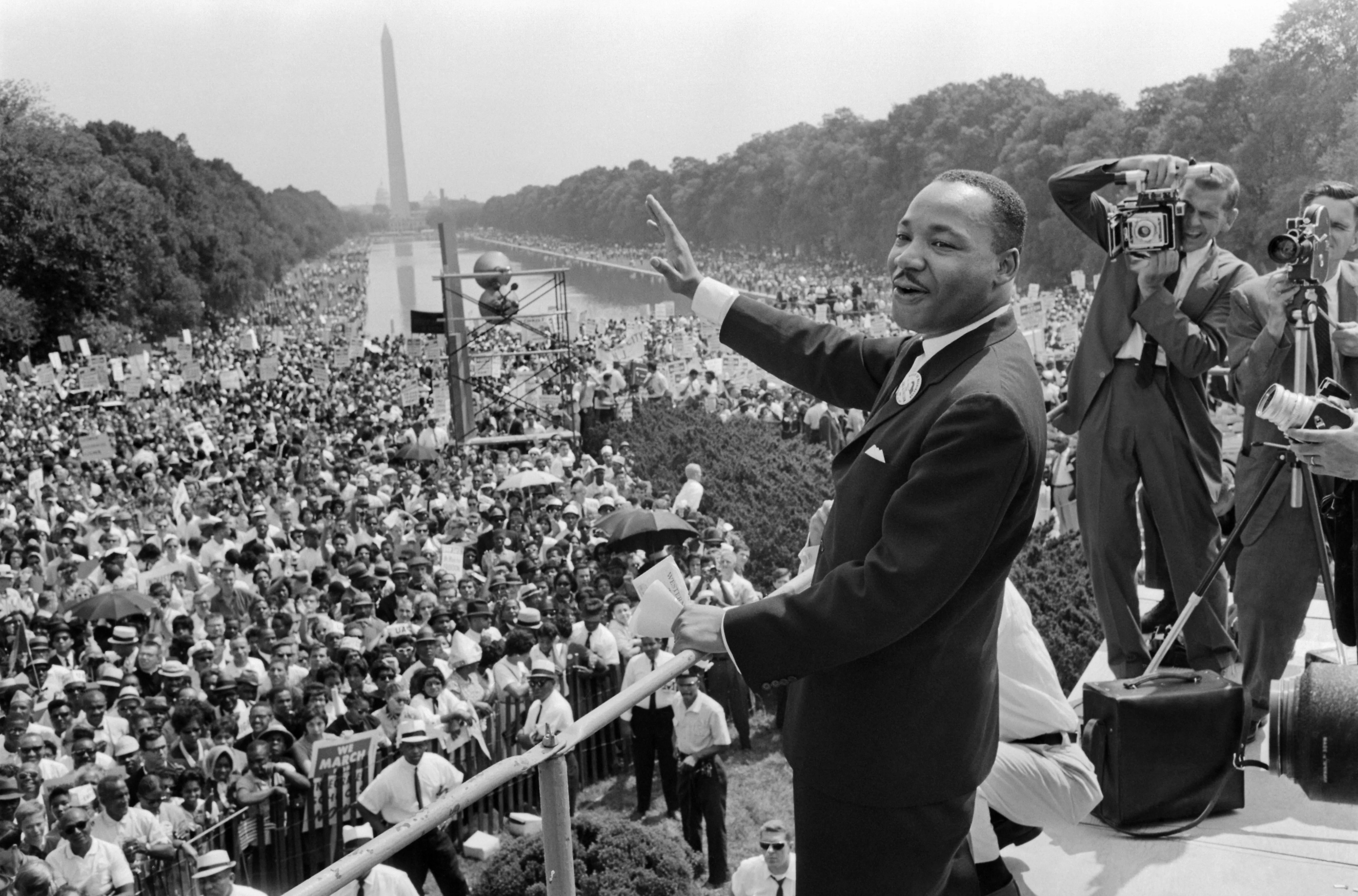
MLK Jr. after giving his "I Have a Dream" speech in 1963's March on Washington for Jobs and Freedom. The U.S. Civil Rights Movement is one of the most famous social movements of the 20th century.

- Collective action / Collective behavior
- Relative deprivation
- Value-added theory
- Resource mobilization/political opportunity
- Framing (frame analysis theory)
- New social movements
- New culture (Note: Including theories by James M. Jasper, Jeff Goodwin, et al.)

=== Theories of science and technology ===
- Institutional sociology of science
- Social construction of technology
- Actor-network theory
- Normalization process theory
- Theories of technology

Criminology: the scientific study of crime and criminals

== Theories of crime ==
The general theory of crime refers to the proposition by Michael R. Gottfredson and Travis Hirschi (1990) that the main factor in criminal behaviour is the individual's lack of self-control.

Theorists who do not distinguish the differences that exist between criminals and noncriminals are considered to be classical or control theorists. Such theorists believe that those who perform deviant acts do so out of enjoyment without care for consequences. Likewise, positivists view criminals actions as a result of the person themselves instead of the nature of the person.

=== Labeling theory ===
The essential notion of labeling theory is that deviance and conformity result not so much from what people do as from how others respond to these actions. It also states that a society's reaction to specific behaviors are a major determinant of how a person may come to adopt a "deviant" label. This theory stresses the relativity of deviance, the idea that people may define the same behavior in any number of ways. Thus the labelling theory is a micro-level analysis and is often classified in the social-interactionist approach.

=== Hate crimes ===
A hate crime can be defined as a criminal act against a person or a person's property by an offender motivated by racial, ethnic, religious or other bias. Hate crimes may refer to race, ancestry, religion, sexual orientation and physical disabilities. According to Statistics Canada, the "Jewish" community has been the most likely to be victim to hate crimes in Canada in 2001–2002. Overall, about 57% of hate crimes are motivated by ethnicity and race, targeting mainly Blacks and Asians, while 43% target religion, mainly Judaism and Islam. A relatively small 9% is motivated by sexual orientation, targets gays and lesbians.

Physical traits do not distinguish criminals from non criminals, but genetic factors together with environmental factors are strong predictors of adult crime and violence. Most psychologists see deviance as the result of "unsuccessful" socialization and abnormality in an individual personality.

=== Psychopathy ===
A psychopath can be defined as a serious criminal who does not feel shame or guilt from their actions, as they have little (if any) sympathy for the people they harm, nor do they fear punishment. Individuals of such nature may also be known to have an antisocial personality disorder. Robert D. Hare, one of the world's leading experts on psychopathy, developed an important assessment device for psychopathy, known as the Psychopathy Checklist (revised). For many, this measure is the single, most important advancement to date toward what will hopefully become our ultimate understanding of psychopathy.

Psychopaths exhibit a variety of maladaptive traits, such as rarity in experience of genuine affection for others. Moreover, they are skilled at faking affection; are irresponsible, impulsive, hardly tolerant of frustration; and they pursue immediate gratification. Likewise, containment theory suggests that those with a stronger conscience will be more tolerable to frustrations, thus less likely to be involved in criminal activities.

=== White-collar crime ===
Sutherland and Cressey (1978) define white-collar crime as crime committed by persons of high social position in the course of their occupation. The white-collar crime involves people making use of their occupational position to enrich themselves and others illegally, which often causes public harm. In white-collar crime, public harm wreaked by false advertising, marketing of unsafe products, embezzlement, and bribery of public officials is more extensive than most people think, most of which go unnoticed and unpunished.

Likewise, corporate crime refers to the illegal actions of a corporation or people acting on its behalf. Corporate crime ranges from knowingly selling faulty or dangerous products to purposely polluting the environment. Like white-collar crime, most cases of corporate crime go unpunished, and many are not never even known to the public.

=== Other theories of crime ===
- Differential association: Developed by Edwin Sutherland, this theory examines criminal acts from the perspective that they are learned behaviours.
- Control theory: The theory was developed by Travis Hirschi and it states that a weak bond between an individual and society itself allows the individual to defy societal norms and adopt behaviors that are deviant in nature.
- Rational choice theory: States that people commit crimes when it is rational for them to do so according to analyses of costs and benefits, and that crime can be reduced by minimizing benefits and maximizing costs to the "would be" criminal.
- Social disorganization theory: States that crime is more likely to occur in areas where social institutions are unable to directly control groups of individuals.
- Social learning theory: States that people adopt new behaviors through observational learning in their environments.
- Strain theory: States that a social structure within a society may cause people to commit crimes. Specifically, the extent and type of deviance people engage in depend on whether a society provides the means to achieve cultural goals.
- Subcultural theory: States that behavior is influenced by factors such as class, ethnicity, and family status. This theory's primary focus is on juvenile delinquency.
- Organized crime: a business that supplies illegal goods or services, including sex, drugs, and gambling. This type of crime expanded among immigrants, who found that society was not always willing to share its opportunities with them. A famous example of organized crime is the Italian Mafia.

== See also ==
- Sociological imagination
- Index of sociology articles
- List of sociologists
- Bibliography of sociology
- List of sociology journals
- Branches of sociology
- Timeline of sociology
- History of the social sciences

== Introductory reading ==
- Adams, B. N., and R. A. Sydie. 2001. Sociological Theory. Pine Forge Press.
- Bilton, T., K. Bonnett, and P. Jones. 2002. Introductory Sociology. Palgrave Macmillan. ISBN 0-333-94571-9.
- Babbie, Earle R. 2003. The Practice of Social Research (10th ed.). Wadsworth: Thomson Learning. ISBN 0-534-62029-9.
- Goodman, D. J., and G. Ritzer. 2004. Sociological Theory (6th ed.). McGraw Hill.
- Hughes, M., C. J. Kroehler, and J. W. Vander Zanden. 2001. Sociology: The Core. McGraw-Hill. ISBN 0-07-240535-X. Lay summary (chapter 1).
- Germov, J. 2001. "A Class Above the Rest? Education and the Reproduction of Class Inequality." Pp. 233–48 in Sociology of Education: Possibilities and Practices, edited by J. Allen. Tuggerah, NSW: Social Science Press. ISBN 1-876633-23-9.

=== External links ===
- American Sociological Association - Section on Theory
- European Sociological Association: Social Theory Research Network (RN29)
- International Sociological Association: Research Committee on Sociological Theory (RC16)
- Sociological Theory [academic journal].
- New theory of social evolution and social structure
