= Irving Louis Horowitz =

American sociologist (1929–2012)

- Known for: Proposing a quantitative index for measuring a country's quality of life, and helped to popularize "Third World" as a term for the poorer nations of the Non-Aligned Movement

Academic background
- Education: City College of New York; Columbia University; University of Buenos Aires

Academic work
- Discipline: Sociologist
- Institutions: University of Buenos Aires; Washington University in St. Louis; Rutgers University

Irving Louis Horowitz (September 25, 1929 – March 21, 2012) was an American sociologist, author, and academic. He proposed a quantitative index for measuring a country's quality of life, and helped to popularize "Third World" as a term for the poorer nations of the Non-Aligned Movement.

== Early life and education ==
Horowitz was born in New York City on September 25, 1929, to Louis and Esther Tepper Horowitz. He was educated at City College of New York (now City College of the City University of New York), where he received his B.Sc. in 1951. He obtained his M.A. in 1952 at Columbia University, New York City, and his Ph.D. at the University of Buenos Aires, Argentina, in 1957.

== Academic positions and consultancies ==
After beginning his career as an assistant professor of social theory at the University of Buenos Aires, 1956–1958, Horowitz spent the next forty-plus years at various academic institutions in India, Tokyo, Mexico, and Canada. In addition to his teaching positions, he was an advisory staff member of the Latin American Research Center, 1964–1970; and consultant to the International Education Division, Ford Foundation, 1959–1960.

From 1963 to 1969, Horowitz was professor of sociology at Washington University in St. Louis. He has also been a visiting professor at Stanford University, the University of Wisconsin–Madison, Queen's University in Canada, and the University of California, and a Fulbright Lecturer in Argentina, Israel, and India; a member of the advisory board of the Institute for Scientific Information, 1969–1973; consulting editor for Oxford University Press, 1969–74, for Aldine-Atherton Publishers, 1969–1972; an external board member of the Radio Marti and Television Marti Programs of the United States Information Agency, beginning in 1985; chair of the board of the Hubert Humphrey Center, Ben Gurion University, Israel, 1990–1992; and served as an external board member of the methodology section of the research division, United States General Accounting Office. Horowitz's latest academic post was Hannah Arendt University Professor Emeritus of Sociology and Political Science at Rutgers University, since 1992.

=== Transaction Publishers and Society ===
He was the founding president of the Transaction Society, whose Transaction Publishers has been an international publisher of scholarly monographs, including academic monographs that need not have been viewed as profitable. He was the founding editor of Society, which published articles on sociology, politics, and social criticism. It has been purchased by Springer Verlag.

== Scholarly contributions ==
As the author of more than twenty-five books and editor of numerous other titles, Horowitz analyzed such diverse topics as the influence of Sun Myung Moon and the Unification Church on American politics, the future of book publishing, and politics in Cuba. Horowitz was the founder of Studies in Comparative International Development. He was also chairman of Transaction Publishers.

Horowitz claimed to have been a student of Leftist sociologist C. Wright Mills, a Texas-born professor at Columbia University whose most significant books include, White Collar, The Power Elite, and The Sociological Imagination. Horowitz edited a posthumous collection of Mills' work, Power, Politics, and People as well as The New Sociology, a collection of papers about him. A 2007 article challenged the integrity of Horowitz's editing, reported on his vexatious relationship with Mills's widow, and debunked his claims to have known Mills.

Over the several decades until his death Horowitz worked to develop a political sociology that can measure the extent of a society's personal freedom and State-sanctioned violence. As a result of his work, a standard for the quality of life in any particular nation or social system has been constructed based on the number of people arbitrarily killed, maimed, injured, incarcerated, or deprived of basic civil liberties. Horowitz tried to build a bridge between his current analysis of state power and authority and his earlier studies of comparative international stratification and development. He was key to introducing the phrase "Third World" into the lexicon of social research. Horowitz articulated the view that republication of previous publications in different formats is necessary in the social sciences to disseminate research results and make them useful to society.

Horowitz wrote about genocide: “First comes the act and then comes the word: first [the crime of] genocide is committed and then the language emerges to describe a phenomenon." He published lasting contributions on the subject, including Genocide: State power & mass murder; Taking lives: Genocide & state power; and "Genocide and the reconstruction of social theory: Observations on the exclusivity of collective death" in Armenian Review. Horowitz's last scholarly pieces on genocide were his preface to R. J. Rummel's Death by government, and his essay on state-sponsored terror, "Counting Bodies. The Dismal Science of Authorized Terror" in Patterns of Prejudice. In Summer 1994, a volume of essays in honour of Horowitz was published by Transaction Publishers.

In 1990, he published an autobiography, a brief "sociological biography" rather than one that is intellectual or intimate. This was Daydreams and nightmares: Reflections on a Harlem childhood, for which he received the National Jewish Book Award in 1991. It is an unromanticized look at growing up as the son of Russian-Jewish immigrants in the streets of predominantly black Harlem, New York City, in the 1930s. Among his most recent books are Tributes: Personal reflections on a century of social research; and Behemoth: Main currents in the history and theory of political sociology.

A list of scholarly publications including more than two hundred works by Horowitz is found at the beta-version of Google Scholar.

=== Criticism of Marxist trends in sociology ===
Horowitz is noted for his 1994 work The Decomposition of Sociology, in which he argued that the discipline is in decline due to overly-ideological theory, a shift away from American sociology and toward European (particularly Marxist) trends which he labelled as "left-wing fascists" and "professional savages", and an apparent lack of relevance to policy making. He wrote: "The decomposition of sociology began when this great tradition became subject to ideological thinking, and an inferior tradition surfaced in the wake of totalitarian triumphs." Sociologist George Steinmetz challenged Horowitz. In a 2005 article in The Michigan Quarterly Review titled "The Cultural Contradictions of Irving Louis Horowitz", he wrote that "historical, cultural and geographic" context remained critical.

== Personal life ==
In 1951, Horowitz married Ruth Narowlansky, with whom he had two children; they were divorced in 1964. He married Danielle Salti in 1964; the couple was divorced in 1978. He married Mary Ellen Curtis in 1979. He died on March 21, 2012. In 1973, Horowitz was one of the signers of the Humanist Manifesto II.

== Honors and awards ==
Throughout his academic career, Horowitz received many awards, including a special citation from the Carnegie Endowment for International Peace for his 1957 book, The Idea of War and Peace in Contemporary Philosophy; recognition by Time magazine as a leader of a new breed of radical sociologist; the Centennial Medallion from St. Peter's College, Jersey City, New Jersey, 1971, for outstanding contribution to a humanistic social science; and a Presidential Outstanding Achievement Award, 1985, from Rutgers University. He was a member of the Carnegie Council, American Association of Publishers, American Political Science Association, American Association for the Advancement of Science, and past president (1961–1962) of the New York State Sociological Society.

== Selected works ==
- The Anarchists (1964)
- Winners and Losers: Social and Political Polarities in America (1984); a criticism of left-wing fascism
- Cuban Communism: 1959–2003. 11th edition.
- The Long Night of Dark Intent: A Half Century of Cuban Communism. Transaction Publishers (2011).
- The War Game. Transaction Publishers (2013), Edited and with a new Introduction,"Conflagration and Calculation," by Howard G. Schneiderman
- Professing Sociology: Studies in the Life Cycle of the Social Sciences. Transaction Publishers (2014), with a new Introduction - "Fugitive Thoughts Tamed," by Howard G. Schneiderman
