= Social theory =

Framework used to study social phenomena

Social theories are analytical frameworks, or paradigms, that are used to study and interpret social phenomena. A tool used by social scientists, social theories relate to historical debates over the validity and reliability of different methodologies (e.g. positivism and antipositivism), the primacy of either structure or agency, as well as the relationship between contingency and necessity. Social theory in an informal nature, or authorship based outside of academic social and political science, may be referred to as "social criticism" or "social commentary", or "cultural criticism" and may be associated both with formal cultural and literary scholarship, as well as other non-academic or journalistic forms of writing.

== Definitions ==
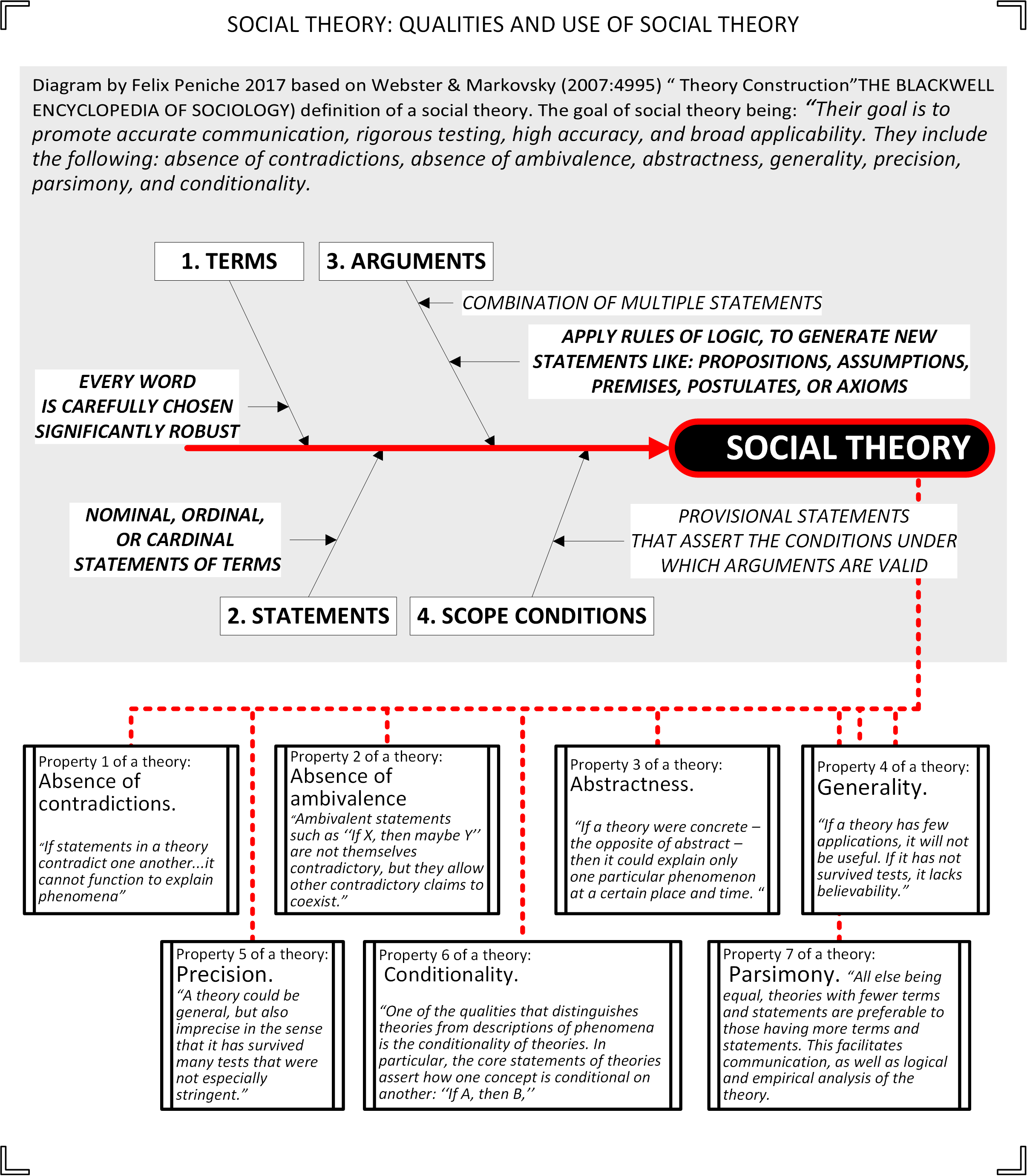

Social theory by definition is used to make distinctions and generalizations among different types of societies, and to analyze modernity as it has emerged in the past few centuries. Social theory, as it is recognized today, emerged in the 20th century as a distinct discipline, and was largely equated with an attitude of critical thinking and the desire for knowledge through a posteriori methods of discovery, rather than a priori methods of tradition.

Dynamic social theory is the hypothesis that institutions and patterns of behaviour are the social science equivalent of theories in the natural sciences. Institutions embody a great deal of knowledge about how to achieve specific social outcomes and, like theories in the natural sciences, serve as models for people seeking to achieve similar outcomes. Examples of dynamic social theories include business models like McDonald's. and China's system of political economy, modelled on Singapore. The claim for this hypothesis is that it can increase the impact and relevance of social science.

Social thought provides general theories to explain actions and behavior of society as a whole, encompassing sociological, political, and philosophical ideas. Classical social theory has generally been presented from a perspective of Western philosophy, and often regarded as Eurocentric.

Theory construction, according to The Blackwell Encyclopedia of Sociology, is instrumental: "Their goal is to promote accurate communication, rigorous testing, high accuracy, and broad applicability. They include the following: absence of contradictions, absence of ambivalence, abstractness, generality, precision, parsimony, and conditionality." Therefore, a social theory consists of well-defined terms, statements, arguments and scope conditions.

== History ==
=== Ancient ===
Confucius (551–479 BCE) envisaged a just society that went beyond his contemporary society of the Warring States. Later on, also in China, Mozi (circa 470 – circa 390 BCE) recommended a more pragmatic sociology, but ethical at base.

In the West, Saint Augustine (354–430) was concerned exclusively with the idea of the just society. St. Augustine describes late Ancient Roman society through a lens of hatred and contempt for what he saw as false Gods, and in reaction theorized City of God. Ancient Greek philosophers, including Aristotle (384–322 BC) and Plato (428/427 or 424/423 – 348/347 BC), did not see a distinction between politics and society. The concept of society did not come until the Enlightenment period. The term, société, was probably first used as key concept by Rousseau in discussion of social relations. Prior to the enlightenment, social theory took largely narrative and normative form. It was expressed as stories and fables, and it may be assumed the pre-Socratic philosophers and religious teachers were the precursors to social theory proper.

=== Medieval ===
There is evidence of early Muslim sociology from the 14th century: in Ibn Khaldun's Muqaddimah (later translated as Prolegomena in Latin), the introduction to a seven volume analysis of universal history, was the first to advance social philosophy and social science in formulating theories of social cohesion and social conflict. Ibn Khaldun is thus considered by many to be the forerunner of sociology. Khaldun's treatise described in Muqaddimah (Introduction to History), published in 1377, two types of societies: (1) the city or town-dweller and (2) the mobile, nomadic societies.

=== European social thought ===
Modernity arose during the Enlightenment period, with the emergence of the world economy and exchange among diverse societies, bringing sweeping changes and new challenges for society. Many French and Scottish intellectuals and philosophers embraced the idea of progress and ideas of modernity.

The Enlightenment period was marked by the idea that with new discoveries challenging the traditional way of thinking, scientists were required to find new normativity. This process allowed scientific knowledge and society to progress. French thought during this period focused on moral critique and criticisms of the monarchy. These ideas did not draw on ideas of the past from classical thinkers, nor involved following religious teachings and authority of the monarch.

A common factor among the classical theories was the agreement that the history of humanity is pursuing a fixed path. They differed on where that path would lead: social progress, technological progress, decline or even fall. Social cycle theorists were skeptical of the Western achievements and technological progress, but argued that progress is an illusion of the ups and downs of the historical cycles. Some social theorists argue that societies develop in recurring cycles rather than in a linear progression of continuous improvement. The classical approach has been criticized by many modern sociologists and theorists; among them Karl Popper, Robert Nisbet, Charles Tilly and Immanuel Wallerstein.

The 19th century brought questions involving social order. The French Revolution freed French society of control by the monarchy, with no effective means of maintaining social order until Napoleon came to power. Three great classical theories of social and historical change emerged: the social evolutionism theory (of which Social Darwinism forms a part), the social cycle theory, and the Marxist historical materialism theory.

19th-century classical social theory has been expanded upon to create newer, contemporary social theories such as multilineal theories of evolution (neoevolutionism, sociobiology, theory of modernization, theory of post-industrial society) and various strains of Neo-Marxism.

In the late 19th and early 20th centuries, social theory became closely related to academic sociology, and other related studies such as anthropology, philosophy, and social work branched out into their own disciplines. Subjects like "philosophy of history" and other multi-disciplinary subject matter became part of social theory as taught under sociology.

A revival of discussion free of disciplines began in the late 1920s and early 1930s. The Frankfurt Institute for Social Research is a historical example. The Committee on Social Thought at the University of Chicago followed in the 1940s. In the 1970s, programs in Social and Political Thought were established at Sussex and York. Others followed, with emphases and structures, such as Social Theory and History (University of California, Davis). Cultural Studies programs extended the concerns of social theory into the domain of culture and thus anthropology. A chair and undergraduate program in social theory was established at the University of Melbourne. Social theory at present seems to be gaining acceptance as a classical academic discipline.

==== Classical social theory ====
Adam Ferguson, Montesquieu, and John Millar, among others, were the first to study society as distinct from political institutions and processes. In the nineteenth century, the scientific method was introduced into study of society, which was a significant advance leading to development of sociology as a discipline.

In the 18th century, the pre-classical period of social theories developed a new form that provides the basic ideas for social theory, such as evolution, philosophy of history, social life and social contract, public and general will, competition in social space, organismic pattern for social description. Montesquieu, in The Spirit of Laws, which established that social elements influence human nature, was possibly the first to suggest a universal explanation for history. Montesquieu included changes in mores and manners as part of his explanation of political and historic events.

Philosophers, including Jean-Jacques Rousseau, Voltaire, and Denis Diderot, developed new social ideas during the Enlightenment period that were based on reason and methods of scientific inquiry. Jean-Jacques Rousseau in this time played a significant role in social theory. He revealed the origin of inequality, analyzed the social contract (and social compact) that forms social integration and defined the social sphere or civil society. Jean-Jacques Rousseau also emphasized that man has the liberty to change his world, an assertion that made it possible to program and change society.

Adam Smith addressed the question of whether vast inequalities of wealth represented progress. He explained that the wealthy often demand convenience, employing numerous others to carry out labor to meet their demands. Smith argued that this allows wealth to be redistributed among inhabitants, and for all to share in progress of society. Smith explained that social forces could regulate the market economy with social objectivity and without need for government intervention. Smith regarded the division of labor as an important factor for economic progress. John Millar suggested that improved status of women was important for progress of society. Millar also advocated for abolition of slavery, suggesting that personal liberty makes people more industrious, ambitious, and productive.

The first "modern" social theories (known as classical theories) that begin to resemble the analytic social theory of today developed simultaneously with the birth of the science of sociology. Auguste Comte (1798–1857), known as the "father of sociology" and regarded by some as the first philosopher of science, laid the groundwork for positivism – as well as structural functionalism and social evolutionism. Karl Marx rejected Comtean positivism but nevertheless aimed to establish a science of society based on historical materialism, becoming recognised as a founding figure of sociology posthumously. At the turn of the 20th century, the first of German sociologists, including Max Weber and Georg Simmel, developed sociological antipositivism. The field may be broadly recognized as an amalgam of three modes of social scientific thought in particular; Durkheimian sociological positivism and structural functionalism, Marxist historical materialism and conflict theory, and Weberian antipositivism and verstehen critique.

Another early modern theorist, Herbert Spencer (1820–1903), coined the term "survival of the fittest". Vilfredo Pareto (1848–1923) and Pitirim A. Sorokin argued that "history goes in cycles," and presented the social cycle theory to illustrate their point. Ferdinand Tönnies (1855–1936) made community and society (Gemeinschaft and Gesellschaft, 1887) the special topics of the new science of "sociology", both of them based on different modes of will of social actors.

The 19th century pioneers of social theory and sociology, like Saint-Simon, Comte, Marx, John Stuart Mill or Spencer, never held university posts and they were broadly regarded as philosophers. Emile Durkheim endeavoured to formally established academic sociology, and did so at the University of Bordeaux in 1895, he published Rules of the Sociological Method. In 1896, he established the journal L'Année Sociologique. Durkheim's seminal monograph, Suicide (1897), a case study of suicide rates amongst Catholic and Protestant populations, distinguished sociological analysis from psychology or philosophy.

==== Post-modern social theory ====
The term "postmodernism" was brought into social theory in 1971 by the Arab American Theorist Ihab Hassan in his book: The Dismemberment of Orpheus: Toward a Postmodern Literature. In 1979 Jean-François Lyotard wrote a short but influential work The Postmodern Condition: A report on knowledge. Jean Baudrillard, Michel Foucault, and Roland Barthes were influential in the 1970s in developing postmodern theory.

Scholars most commonly hold postmodernism to be a movement of ideas arising from, but also critical of elements of modernism. The wide range of uses of this term resulted in different elements of modernity are chosen as being continuous. Each of the different uses is rooted in some argument about the nature of knowledge, known in philosophy as epistemology. Individuals who use the term are arguing that either there is something fundamentally different about the transmission of meaning, or that modernism has fundamental flaws in its system of knowledge.

The argument for the necessity of the term states that economic and technological conditions of our age have given rise to a decentralized, media-dominated society. These ideas are simulacra, and only inter-referential representations and copies of each other, with no real original, stable or objective source for communication and meaning. Globalization, brought on by innovations in communication, manufacturing and transportation, is cited as one force which has decentralized modern life, creating a culturally pluralistic and interconnected global society, lacking any single dominant center of political power, communication, or intellectual production. The postmodern view is that inter-subjective knowledge, and not objective knowledge, is the dominant form of discourse. The ubiquity of copies and dissemination alters the relationship between reader and what is read, between observer and the observed, between those who consume and those who produce.

Not all people who use the term postmodern or postmodernism see these developments as positive. Users of the term argue that their ideals have arisen as the result of particular economic and social conditions, including "late capitalism", the growth of broadcast media, and that such conditions have pushed society into a new historical period.

==== Today ====
In the past few decades, in response to postmodern critiques, social theory has begun to stress free will, individual choice, subjective reasoning, and the importance of unpredictable events in place of deterministic necessity. Rational choice theory, symbolic interactionism, false necessity are examples of more recent developments. A view among contemporary sociologists is that there are no great unifying 'laws of history', but rather smaller, more specific, and more complex laws that govern society.

Philosopher and politician Roberto Mangabeira Unger recently attempted to revise classical social theory by exploring how things fit together, rather than to provide an all encompassing single explanation of a universal reality. He begins by recognizing the key insight of classical social theory of society as an artifact, and then by discarding the law-like characteristics forcibly attached to it. Unger argues that classical social theory was born proclaiming that society is made and imagined, and not the expression of an underlying natural order, but at the same time its capacity was checked by the equally prevalent ambition to create law-like explanations of history and social development. The human sciences that developed claimed to identify a small number of possible types of social organization that coexisted or succeeded one another through inescapable developmental tendencies or deep-seated economic organization or psychological constraints. Marxism is the star example.

Unger, calling his efforts "super-theory", has thus sought to develop a comprehensive view of history and society. Unger does so without subsuming deep structure analysis under an indivisible and repeatable type of social organization or with recourse to law-like constraints and tendencies. His articulation of such a theory is in False Necessity: Anti-Necessitarian Social Theory in the Service of Radical Democracy, where he uses deep-logic practice to theorize human social activity through anti-necessitarian analysis.

Unger begins by formulating the theory of false necessity, which claims that social worlds are the artifact of human endeavors. There is no pre-set institutional arrangement that societies must adhere to, and there is no necessary historical mold of development that they will follow. We are free to choose and to create the forms and the paths that our societies will take. However, this does not give license to absolute contingency. Unger finds that there are groups of institutional arrangements that work together to bring about certain institutional forms—liberal democracy, for example. These forms are the basis of a social structure, which Unger calls formative context. In order to explain how we move from one formative context to another without the conventional social theory constraints of historical necessity (e.g. feudalism to capitalism), and to do so while remaining true to the key insight of individual human empowerment and anti-necessitarian social thought, Unger recognized that there are an infinite number of ways of resisting social and institutional constraints, which can lead to an infinite number of outcomes. This variety of forms of resistance and empowerment make change possible. Unger calls this empowerment negative capability. However, Unger adds that these outcomes are always reliant on the forms from which they spring. The new world is built upon the existing one.

== Schools of thought ==
=== Chicago school ===
The Chicago school developed in the 1920s, through the work of Albion Woodbury Small, W. I. Thomas, Ernest W. Burgess, Robert E. Park, Ellsworth Faris, George Herbert Mead, and other sociologists at the University of Chicago. The Chicago school focused on patterns and arrangement of social phenomenon across time and place, and within context of other social variables.

=== Critical theory ===
Critical theorists focus on reflective assessment and critique of society and culture in order to reveal and challenge power structures and their relations and influences on social groups.

=== Marxism ===
Karl Marx wrote and theorized about the importance of political economy on society, and focused on the "material conditions" of life. His theories centered around capitalism and its effect on class-struggle between the proletariat and bourgeoisie.

=== Postmodernism ===
Postmodernism was defined by Jean-François Lyotard as "incredulity towards metanarratives" and contrasted that with modern which he described as "any science that legitimates itself with reference to a metadiscourse... making an explicit appeal to some grand narrative, such as the dialectics of Spirit the hermeneutics of meaning, the emancipation of the rational or working subject, or the creation of wealth."

=== Other perspectives ===
Other theories include:

- Social constructionist theory
- Rational choice theory
- Structural functionalism – influenced by Spencer and Durkheim
- Social action – influenced by Weber and Pareto
- Conflict theory – influenced by Marx, Simmel
- Symbolic interaction – influenced by George Herbert Mead
- False necessity
- Agential realism
- Elisionism

== Key thinkers ==
=== French social thought ===
Some known French social thinkers are Claude Henri Saint-Simon, Auguste Comte, Émile Durkheim, and Michel Foucault.

=== British social thought ===
British social thought, with thinkers such as Herbert Spencer, addressed questions and ideas relating to political economy and social evolution. The political ideals of John Ruskin were a precursor of social economy (Unto This Last had a very important impact on Gandhi's philosophy).

=== German social thought ===
Important German philosophers and social thinkers included Immanuel Kant, Georg Wilhelm Friedrich Hegel, Karl Marx, Max Weber, Georg Simmel, Theodor W. Adorno, Max Horkheimer, Herbert Marcuse and Niklas Luhmann.

=== Chinese social thought ===
Important Chinese philosophers and social thinkers included Shang Yang, Lao Zi, Confucius, Mencius, Wang Chong, Wang Yangming, Li Zhi, Zhu Xi, Gu Yanwu, Gong Zizhen, Wei Yuan, Kang Youwei, Lu Xun, Mao Zedong, Zhu Ming.

=== Italian sociology ===
Important Italian social scientists include Antonio Gramsci, Gaetano Mosca, Vilfredo Pareto, Franco Ferrarotti.

=== Thai social thought ===
Important Thai social theorists include Jit Phumisak, Kukrit Pramoj, and Prawase Wasi

== In academic practices ==
Social theory seeks to question why humans inhabit the world the way they do, and how that came to be by looking at power relations, social structures, and social norms, while also examining how humans relate to each other and the society they find themselves in, how this has changed over time and in different cultures, and the tools used to measure those things. Social theory looks to interdisciplinarity, combining knowledge from multiple academic disciplines in order to enlighten these complex issues, and can draw on ideas from fields as diverse as anthropology and media studies.

Social theory guides scientific inquiry by promoting scientists to think about which topics are suitable for investigation and how they should measure them. Selecting or creating appropriate theory for use in examining an issue is an important skill for any researcher. Important distinctions: a theoretical orientation (or paradigm) is a worldview, the lens through which one organizes experience (i.e. thinking of human interaction in terms of power or exchange). A theory is an attempt to explain and predict behavior in particular contexts. A theoretical orientation cannot be proven or disproven; a theory can.

Having a theoretical orientation that sees the world in terms of power and control, one could create a theory about violent human behavior which includes specific causal statements (e.g. being the victim of physical abuse leads to psychological problems). This could lead to a hypothesis (prediction) about what one expects to see in a particular sample, e.g. "a battered child will grow up to be shy or violent". One can then test the hypothesis by looking to see if it is consistent with data. One might, for instance, review hospital records to find children who were abused, then track them down and administer a personality test to see if they show signs of being violent or shy. The selection of an appropriate (i.e. useful) theoretical orientation within which to develop a potentially helpful theory is the bedrock of social science.

=== Example of questions posed by social theorists ===
Philosophical questions addressed by social thinkers often centered around modernity, including:

- Can human reason make sense of the social world and shape it for the better?
- Did the development of modern societies, with vast inequalities in wealth among citizens, constitute progress?
- How do particular government interventions and regulations impact natural social processes?
- Should the economy/market be regulated or not?

Other issues relating to modernity that were addressed by social thinkers include social atomization, alienation, loneliness, social disorganization, and secularization.

== See also ==
- Continental philosophy – Philosophical traditions from mainland Europe
- Critical theory – Approach to social philosophy
- Culture theory – Branch of semiotics and anthropology concerning societal norms, behaviors and artifacts
- Engaged theory – Comprehensive critical theory
- Ethnomethodology – Study of how social order is produced
- Feminist theory
- History of sociology
- History of the social sciences
- Literary theory – Systematic study of the nature of literature
- Political philosophy – Study of the foundations of politics
- Political theory
- Post-colonial theory – Study of the cultural legacy of colonialism and imperialism
- Post-structuralism – Philosophical school and tradition
- Postmodernism – Artistic, cultural, and theoretical movement
- Queer theory – Field of critical theory
- Social policy
- Social evolution – Evolution of societies
- Social role theory – Concept in sociology and social psychology
- Sociological theory – Theory advanced by social scientists to explain facts about the social world
