= Pure sociology =

Sociological paradigm

Like rational choice theory, conflict theory, or functionalism, pure sociology is a sociological paradigm — a strategy for explaining human behavior. Developed by Donald Black as an alternative to individualistic and social-psychological theories, pure sociology was initially used to explain variation in legal behavior. Since then, Black and other pure sociologists have used the strategy to explain terrorism, genocide, lynching, and other forms of conflict management as well as science, art, and religion.

== Etymology and history ==
The term "pure sociology" has evolved through two distinct academic traditions: the classical evolutionary approach of the early 20th century and the modern structural-scientific approach of the late 20th century.

=== Lester Frank Ward (1903) ===
The conceptual distinction between "pure" and "applied" sociology was first established by Lester Frank Ward, the inaugural president of the American Sociological Association. In his foundational work, Pure Sociology (1903), Ward defined pure sociology as the study of the "is"—the origin, nature, and spontaneous development of social structures and processes. He argued that pure sociology must remain value-neutral, focusing on how society actually functions, while applied sociology (the "ought") focuses on how society should be improved through social engineering.

=== European Formal Sociology ===
Parallel to the American tradition, European scholars such as Ferdinand Tönnies utilized the term reine Soziologie (pure sociology) to describe the creation of purely conceptual frameworks. Tönnies's pure sociology consisted of "ideal types" and axiomatic constructs, such as Gemeinschaft and Gesellschaft, which serve as analytical tools to interpret empirical social reality.

=== Modern paradigm: social geometry ===
In contemporary theory, pure sociology is most closely associated with Donald Black. Black's paradigm represents a radical shift toward social geometry, explaining social life strictly through its location and direction in a multidimensional social space. This model identifies five primary variables of social space:

- Stratification: The vertical aspect of social space, or the uneven distribution of material resources.
- Morphology: The horizontal aspect, including the degree of social integration and relational distance.
- Culture: The symbolic aspect, such as religion, language, or aesthetics.
- Organization: The corporate aspect, or the capacity for collective action.
- Social Control: The normative aspect, defining what is right or wrong and how people respond to deviant behavior.

== Epistemology ==
Pure sociology explains social life with its social geometry. Social life refers to any instance of human behavior—such as law, suicide, gossip, or art — while the social geometry of a behavior, also called its social structure, refers to the social characteristics of those involved—such as their degree of past interaction or their level of wealth. To some extent this approach draws from aspects of earlier sociological work, ranging from Durkheim's emphasis on social explanations for individual behavior to later work in the variation of police (and other legal) behavior.

== Differences ==
Virtually all sociology explains the behavior of people—whether groups or individuals—with some reference to their mental constructs (psychology) or the purposes of their action (teleology). But pure sociology reconceptualizes human behavior as social life—something that does not exist in the mind, is not explainable by the aims of actions, and is supraindividual. Pure sociology, then, can be distinguished from other sociological paradigms by what is absent from it: psychology, teleology, and even people as such. Pure sociology's focus on a unique social reality may sound Durkheimian, but Black views the approach as "more Durkheimian than Durkheim."

== Explanations ==
In The Behavior of Law, published in 1976, Donald Black introduced the first example of pure sociology—a general theory of law, or governmental social control. This theory seeks to explain variation in law, and one aspect of legal variation is the amount of law attracted to a case of conflict. A conflict is a situation where one person has a grievance against another, such as where an assault has occurred or a contract has been broken, and the offended parties may or may not appeal to the police or to the civil courts to resolve it. Cases may attract law or not, then, and when they do attract law, there may be more or less of it. When the police make an arrest in an assault case, for instance, there is more law when there is merely a call to the police, and when someone is convicted and sentenced there is more law than when there is merely an arrest. The pure sociology of law explains this variation by identifying a number of sociological variables that are associated with variation in the quantity of law. These include various forms of social status (such as wealth, integration, culture, conventionality, organization, and respectability) as well as various forms of social distance (such as relational distance and cultural distance). These are aspects of the social structures of cases, then, and so cases where the disputants are both high in status have different social structures—and are handled differently—than cases involving low-status disputants. Whether the disputants are socially close to or distant from one another also determines the amount of law the case attracts. For example, one of the theory's predictions is that within a society, law varies directly with relational distance. Relational distance refers to the amount and intensity of interaction between the parties, so the theory predicts that there is more law in conflicts between strangers than in those between intimates. This aspect of the theory explains numerous facts, such as why those who kill strangers are punished more severely than those who kill intimates and why women who are raped by strangers are more likely to report it to the police.

Since the publication of The Behavior of Law, Black and other pure sociologists have applied the theoretical strategy to numerous other subjects. Most notably, Black has developed a general theory of social control that goes beyond law to explain more generally the handling of all human conflicts. Most conflicts are handled without appealing to the legal system, and the theory thus explains not just law but avoidance, gossip, therapy, feuding, and numerous other forms of non-governmental social control. In addition to extending the subject matter, this later work also extends the theory to focus not just on the social characteristics of the initial disputants in a conflict, but also of third parties (all those with knowledge of a conflict). For example, Mark Cooney examines how third party behavior shapes violence. Whether and how third parties involve themselves in a conflict can determine not only the likelihood of violence, but also the form the violence takes. For example, social configurations characterized by close and distant group ties are conducive to feud-like behavior where violence occurs back and forth between groups over a long period of time. In this situation, third parties are members of groups, and they are relationally close to fellow group members but distant from others. When conflicts between groups occur, they thus support one side and oppose the other, and they may join in retaliatory violence against members of rival groups. Other social configurations are conducive to other forms of violence or even to peace. For example, where there are cross-cutting ties, such as where people are relationally close to members of other groups, third parties are more likely to promote peace.

Recently, Black has moved beyond the study of how conflicts are handled to examine the origin of conflict itself. Moral Time identifies the causes of clashes of right and wrong in human relationships. In doing so, this theory invokes a new explanatory concept—the idea of movement in social time — and thus extends the pure sociological approach.

Black and others have also moved beyond conflict and social control to develop explanations of ideas, predation, welfare, research, and other forms of social life. For example, Black's theory of ideas explains the content of ideas with their social structures. Just as each conflict has a social structure that consists of the social characteristics of the disputants and third parties, every idea—every statement about reality—has a social structure consisting of the characteristics of the source, subject, and audience. For example, the subject of an idea may be intimate or distant from the source: People have ideas about family members and friends as well as strangers. The subject may also be high or low in social status: People have ideas about senators and businessmen as well as skid row vagrants. But ideas vary depending on their social structures. Black's explanation of voluntarism and determinism, for example, states that ideas about high status subjects are more likely to be voluntaristic (to invoke free will). The theory would predict, then, that people would offer voluntaristic explanations of senators and businessmen and deterministic explanations of skid row vagrants.

== Praise and criticism ==
While sociologists such as Randall Collins, Karen A. Cerulo, David Sciulli, and Jonathan H. Turner have praised aspects of pure sociology, the approach has also been criticized. Kam C. Wong criticizes pure sociology's scientism, David F. Greenberg its use of covering-law explanations, and Thomas J. Scheff its attempt at disciplinary purity. In a 2008 symposium, Douglas A. Marshall offers an extended critique of the system. Marshall argues that, contrary to Black's stated goal of making sociology more scientific, his approach is actually antithetical to modern scientific values and practices—a theme reiterated by Stephen Turner in the same symposium.

== Response to criticism ==
Mark Cooney, Allan Horwitz, and Joseph Michalski have responded to some specific criticisms of pure sociology, while Donald Black, in "The Epistemology of Pure Sociology" as well as other writings, has responded generally to critics' claims and provided an extensive defense of the pure sociological approach.

Noting the ideological nature of many of the attacks, Black says that his theory is in fact "politically and morally neutral." But according to Black, it nonetheless attracts politicized hostility due to its unconventionality:

"My work is shocking not because it is politically incorrect, but because it is epistemologically incorrect. It violates conventional conceptions of social reality in general and legal and moral reality in particular. It therefore shocks — epistemologically shocks — many on whom it is inflicted. If I disturb your universe I may be worthy of contempt. I may appear to be your favorite political enemy, a conservative if you are radical, a radical if you are conservative."

Black also discusses the aims of the approach. While it is unconventional sociology, it is conventional science, striving to provide simple, general, testable, valid, and original explanations of reality. And it is by these criteria alone, Black maintains, that it should be judged:

"If you wish to criticize my work, tell me you can predict and explain legal and related behavior better than I can. Tell me my work is not as testable as something else, tell me it is not as general as something else, tell me it is less elegant than something else, tell me that it has already been published, or just tell me it is wrong. Tell me something relevant to what I am trying to accomplish — something scientific."
