= The Behavior of Law =

Book on sociological theory of law by Donald Black

- Author: Donald Black
- Language: English
- Subject: Sociology of law
- Publisher: Academic Press
- Publication date: 1976
- Publication place: United States
- ISBN: 0121026507

The Behavior of Law is a 1976 book by Donald Black published by Academic Press, located in the field of sociology of law. It has been referred to as the most important text in that subfield and a major contribution to sociology in general.

The work presents a general theory of law that attempts to explain variations in law across societies and among individuals within societies according to social structure, including differences in status, relational distance, and social organization. Black treats law as a measurable quantitative variable that varies across time and space as well as across characteristics of individuals. The theory seeks to explain variations in the quantity and style of law—such as arrest, prosecution, and punishment—by reference to social relationships rather than individual motives or institutional norms.

== Contents ==
Black defines law as "governmental social control" and treats it as a quantitative variable that can be measured by the number and scope of prohibitions, obligations, and other legal standards, as well as the rate of legal activity such as legislation, litigation, and adjudication.

A central feature of Black's theory is its macrosociological orientation. Unlike previous theories, he attempts to explain legal behavior without reference to psychological or individual-level variables such as individual motivations, rationality or psychological drives. He focuses instead on structural relationships between social actors. Black argues that empirical phenomena (social facts) addressed by theories of illegal behavior such as the crime rate can be explained as outcomes of the behavior of law itself, determined by social structure, including the relative positions of individuals (such as victims and offenders), rather than of through motivations and individual decision-making (the nature or consequences of individual actions). In other words, his theory attempts to predict and explain social life without regard to the individual as such, and is independent of considerations such as that some people may be more or less, for instance, rational, goal-directed, pleasure-seeking, or pain-avoiding. This methodological stance is intended to enhance generality and testability, allowing the theory to apply across diverse historical and cultural contexts.

A key concept in the theory is the "quantity of law", which refers to the extent of legal regulation and activity in a given context. This quantity is operationalized through actions such as complaints to legal authorities, arrests, prosecutions, and other legal processes. In empirical research, reporting a crime to the police is treated as an instance of the initiation of law and thus an increase in its quantity. Black's also suggested, in the context of long-term trends in law, that increasing equality and interdependence in society could reduce the amount of law, potentially leading toward a form of "anarchy" (defined as absence of law).

Black also discusses "styles of law", which include penal, compensatory, therapeutic, and conciliatory forms.

The theory also introduces a distinctive unit of analysis sometimes referred to as the "sociology of the case", focusing on relationships among participants in conflicts rather than on legal institutions themselves. It draws heavily on cross-cultural and historical comparisons and often relies on qualitative data, reflecting a research philosophy that prioritizes validity and close empirical observation over large-scale statistical analysis.

=== Social geometry ===
Another major concept introduced in the book is that of social geometry. This theory posits that law varies systematically with other aspects of social life, including stratification, morphology, culture, organization, and social control. These dimensions are expressed in a series of propositions intended to explain differences in the quantity and style of law across societies and within them.

Stratification refers to the vertical distribution of material resources and social rank. Black proposes that law varies directly with rank, meaning that individuals of higher social status are more likely to invoke the law, for example by reporting crimes to authorities, than those of lower status. Black also argues that wherever people are more equal, there is less law—for example, there is less law among neighbors, colleagues, and friends—and that this principle applies at the level of entire societies, regions, communities, and neighborhoods.

Morphology concerns the patterns of social relationships, including interaction, division of labor, and relational distance. Black argues that law increases with social distance between individuals. He also suggests that law varies with factors such as community size, integration, and population density. This means, for example, that law is less likely to be invoked in close-knit groups such as family than in more diversified settings. Black also hypothesizes that the quantity of law is related to population density: the greater the density, the greater the law.

Culture refers to the symbolic aspects of social life, including beliefs, values, and aesthetic expressions. Black includes culture as a dimension influencing law, though its effects are conceptualized at a general level within the broader theoretical system. Black uses education as his primary indicator of individual culture, and proposes that law varies directly with culture at both the individual and societal level—for example, literate and educated people are more likely to bring lawsuits against others.

Black defines organization as "the corporate aspect of social life, the capacity for collective action", found in any group, from a couple or a family to a political party or state. He argues that law is greater in a direction toward less organization than toward more organization. This implies that a collectivity is more likely to litigate against an individual than vice versa. In criminal matters, for example, Black argues that the police are more likely to hear about a robbery of a business than a robbery of an individual on the street.

Black defines social control as "the normative aspect of social life", which defines and responds to deviant behavior. The quantity of law varies inversely with other forms of social control, such as etiquette, custom, ethics or bureaucracy. Black also suggests that in settings that permit people continuously to observe and react to each other's conduct, law is less important as a mechanism of social control, so for example, there is less less law than public settings, and that law even varies even with the time of day—when people go to sleep, most social control relaxes and law increases.

== Criticism ==
=== Empirical evaluation ===
After the book publication, Black's theory has been subject to empirical testing, including analyses using National Crime Survey data on victim reporting behavior. These studies assess whether patterns of legal behavior correspond to Black's predictions regarding social structure. Findings from such analyses indicate that some of Black's propositions, particularly those related to stratification and morphology, are not consistently supported by empirical data. For example, reporting of crimes to the police appears to be more strongly related to the seriousness of the offense than to the social rank of the victim.

Additionally, empirical findings suggest that theories of law cannot ignore the seriousness of infractions, as this factor plays a significant role in determining legal responses.

This criticism, however, has been subject to its own rebuttal. Critics of this view argue that many tests of the theory suffer from methodological shortcomings, such as poor measurement of key variables or incomplete data on relevant actors in legal disputes, or "only very partial tests of a theory meant to apply to many other domains".

=== Seriousness of offenses ===
One major criticism concerns Black's treatment of the seriousness of offenses. In his framework, seriousness is defined by the amount of law invoked, rather than by the harm caused to victims, which differs from traditional sociological definitions. Critics argue that this approach makes it difficult to independently assess the role of harm in shaping legal responses, as in Black's theory, variation in litigation, arrest, prosecution, or sentencing is never accounted for in terms of variation in conduct. Black replied to the criticism, arguing that the concept of "seriousness" was an evaluative, rather than a purely descriptive, concept, and that introducing it into a sociological theory of law amounted to importing common sense into science.

== Reception ==
The book received numerous reviews in academic journals, such as Law & Society Review, American Journal of Sociology, and Contemporary Sociology.

Klaus Eder (1977) characterized The Behavior of Law as a "rationalist" and highly abstract theoretical project within the tradition of grand theory, emphasizing its attempt to construct a general scientific language for explaining law independent of historical and subjective context. He noted that Black's approach deliberately excludes psychological and normative dimensions in favor of purely structural explanations, which enhances generality but raises methodological concerns about implicit assumptions and limited applicability. Eder argued that some of Black's propositions risk tautology and reduce complex social phenomena to stratification variables, ultimately concluding that the theory's claim to universal, value-free explanation is undermined by implicit normative and historically specific assumptions.

Arthur L. Stinchcombe (1977) saw Black's work as an example of a "classical" sociological approach that deliberately excludes intentions and subjective meanings in favor of purely structural explanation, comparing it to the tradition of Émile Durkheim. While he praised Black as one of the most "exact and elegant" practitioners of this approach, he questioned its analytical strategy, arguing that eliminating intentions risks oversimplifying complex legal phenomena and ignoring important aspects of social life. Stinchcombe suggested that attempts to fit the sociology of law into a highly general, hypothetico-deductive framework may sacrifice substantive richness, concluding that legal behavior may ultimately require more complex and "learned" forms of explanation rather than a single unified theory.

Dietrich Rueschemeyer (1978) praised the book for its "classic simplicity" of style and substance and for its ambitious integration of a wide range of sociological and anthropological insights into a unified theoretical framework. He described the work as a potential "breakthrough" in theoretical ordering that generates numerous new hypotheses, while also noting that its claims to comprehensive explanation remain problematic due to unresolved issues in theory construction and empirical validation. In particular, he criticized the book's strategy of treating law and other social phenomena as quantitative variables as insufficiently developed, arguing that it risks conceptual oversimplification and leaves key methodological questions unanswered.

Lawrence W. Sherman (1978) described The Behavior of Law as a "remarkable fulfillment" of Black's ambition to construct a general, value-free sociological theory of law, praising its scope, elegance, and systematic structure. He highlighted the theory's ability to explain a wide range of social phenomena at a purely structural level, calling its empirical illustrations "stunning" and its propositions broadly generative for future research. At the same time, Sherman noted limitations arising from the book's brevity and abstraction, including conceptual ambiguities, difficulties in empirical testing, and the lack of explicit causal mechanisms, arguing that the theory requires further refinement and systematic empirical investigation.

== Significance and legacy ==
The Behavior of Law has been described as a major contribution to sociology, in particular the field of sociology of law, where it has been referred to as a most important text in that subfield. Proponents point to a body of supporting evidence, including cross-cultural, historical, and qualitative studies, as well as independent research consistent with the theory's predictions.

Nonetheless, The Behavior of Law has been described as relatively neglected within the field of sociology of law. While widely recognized by name, it has generated a comparatively small body of research directly building on its framework and has not become dominant in mainstream legal sociology. Its rejection of psychological explanations, its integration of qualitative data with general theoretical propositions, and its deviation from established methodological divisions within sociology have all contributed to resistance within the discipline.

The work has also been compared favorably with classical theories of conflict, highlighting its potential importance for the development of general sociological theory. Some scholars suggest that increased empirical testing and greater alignment with conventional research practices may enhance its recognition in the future.

Black would later develop this theory into a broader concept he termed "pure sociology".
