= Blue–seven phenomenon =

Purported social preference phenomenon

The blue–seven phenomenon is a social phenomenon in which a purported statistical majority of people in the US choose the color blue and number seven when asked to randomly select a color and a single digit number. The cause of the cognitive bias is not understood, though it has been posited that both colors and numbers are imbued with layers of significance.

The existence of the phenomenon has been disputed. Outside of the US, these preferences may not hold. In other countries, differences occur, particularly in Northern Ireland where a noted bias of green and eight results in a green–eight phenomenon.
