= The Marxists =

1962 book by C. Wright Mills

- Cover of the 1962 Dell edition
- Author: C. Wright Mills
- Language: English
- Subject: Marxism
- Publisher: Dell Publishing
- Publication date: 1962
- Publication place: United States
- Media type: Print (hardcover and paperback)
- Pages: 460
- ISBN: 978-0-440-35470-3

The Marxists is a 1962 book about Marxism by the sociologist C. Wright Mills.

== Reception ==
The political scientist David McLellan praised The Marxists, calling its account of Karl Marx's ideas acute.
