= Legal behavior =

Variations in behavior control

In sociology, legal behavior refers to variations in the methods and degree of governmental social control of behavior.

== Background ==
In 1976, theoretical sociologist Donald Black introduced a general sociological theory of law in his book The Behavior of Law. The theory exemplified Black's sociological paradigm known as pure sociology.

A central aspect of this paradigm was the reconceptualization of human behavior as the behavior of social life. Thus, the behavior of many individuals may be understood—and more readily explained—as a single phenomenon.

One form of social life is law, defined by Black as governmental social control. Social control is any process of defining and responding to deviance. Any increase of governmental social control—be it a call to the police, an arrest, a prosecution, or a conviction—is thus an increase of law.

The word "behavior" is used here as it is used in the physical sciences to refer to variation. In this sense, everything behaves, including particles, storm systems, and law.

Black's theory predicts and explains variations in legal behavior, such as why one assault results in a call to the police while another does not, or why one homicide conviction results in capital punishment while another does not.
