= The Sociological Imagination =

1959 book by C. Wright Mills

- First edition
- Author: C. Wright Mills
- Publisher: Oxford University Press
- Publication date: 1959
- Pages: 256
- ISBN: 978-0-19-513373-8
- Dewey Decimal: 301 21
- LC Class: H61 .M5 2000

The Sociological Imagination is a 1959 book by American sociologist C. Wright Mills published by Oxford University Press. In it, he develops the idea of sociological imagination, the means of the relation between self and society can be understood.

Mills felt that the central task for sociology and sociologists was to find (and articulate) the connections between the particular social environments of individuals (also known as "milieu") and the wider social and historical forces in which they are enmeshed. The approach challenges a structural functionalist approach to sociology, as it opens new positions for the individual to inhabit with regard to the larger social structure. Individual function that reproduces larger social structure is only one of many possible roles and is not necessarily the most important. Mills also wrote of the danger of malaise (apathy), which he saw as inextricably embedded in the creation and maintenance of modern societies. This led him to question whether individuals exist in modern societies in the sense that "individual" is commonly understood (Mills, 1959, 7–12).

In writing The Sociological Imagination, Mills tried to reconcile two varying, abstract conceptions of social reality, the "individual" and the "society", and thereby challenged the dominant sociological discourse to define some of its most basic terms and be forthright about the premises behind its definitions. He began the project of reconciliation and challenge with critiques of "grand theory" and "abstracted empiricism", outlining and criticizing their use in the current sociology of the day.

In 1998 the International Sociological Association listed the work as the second most important sociological book of the 20th century.

== Background ==
Mills drafted the book during 12-month Fulbright visit to University of Copenhagen over the period 1956–1957.

== Grand theory ==
In chapter two, Mills seems to be criticizing Parsonian sociology, directly addressing The Social System, written by Talcott Parsons.

In The Social System, Parsons describes the nature of the structure of society and the creation and maintenance of a culture through the socialization of individuals. Mills criticizes this tendency in sociology on several grounds. He argues for a more heterogeneous form of society in that he challenges the extent to which a single uniformity of society is indeed possible.

=== Social order ===
Mills criticizes the Parsonian formulation of social order, particularly the idea that social order can indeed be seen as a whole. He writes that every individual cannot simply be fully integrated into society and internalize all its cultural forms. Furthermore, such domination may be seen as a further extension of power and social stratification.

=== Role of social theory ===
He further criticizes Parsonian sociology on its ability to theorize as a form of pure abstraction that society can be understood irrespective of its historical and contextual nature without observation.

He argues that society and its cultural symbols cannot be seen as self-determining and cannot be derived without reference to individuals and their consciousness. All power according to Parsons is based on a system of beliefs enforced by society, writes Mills. In this he criticizes Parsons for his view in terms of historical and social change and diversity.

He thereby criticizes the means by which a social order can be derived without observation.

== Abstracted empiricism ==
In the third chapter Mills criticizes the empirical methods of social research which he saw as evident at the time in the conception of data and the handling of methodological tools.

This can be seen as a reaction to the plethora of social research being developed from about the time of World War II. This can thereby be seen as much a criticism by Brewer that Mills may have been critical of the research being conducted and sponsored by the American government.

As such Mills criticizes the methodological inhibition which he saw as characteristic of what he called abstracted empiricism. In this he can be seen criticizing the work of Paul F. Lazarsfeld who conceives of sociology not as a discipline but as a methodological tool (Mills, 1959, 55–59).

He argues that the problem of such social research is that there may be a tendency towards "psychologism", which explains human behavior on the individual level without reference to the social context. This, he argues, may lead to the separation of research from theory. He then writes of the construction of milieu in relation to social research and how both theory and research are related (Mills, 1959, 65–68).

The idea has drawn criticism, with Stephen J. Kunitz writing that "Abstracted Empiricists embraced a philosophy based upon what they considered natural science, emphasizing, according to Mills, the significance of Method over substance", with quantitative survey research being the favored practice, for which "large teams, budgets, and institutes were required, leading to the bureaucratization of scholarship and transforming it from a craft to an industrial process". Another critique by Nigel Kettley states that the method "seeks to perfect the art of number crunching, while setting aside the cognitive processes involved in theory building as a form of morbid introspection".

== The human variety ==
In chapter seven Mills sets out what is thought to be his vision of Sociology. He writes of the need to integrate the social, biographical, and historical versions of reality in which individuals construct their social milieus with reference to the wider society (Mills, 1959, 132–134).

He argues that the nature of society is continuous with historical reality. In doing so, Mills writes of the importance of the empirical adequacy of theoretical frameworks. He also writes of the notion of a unified social sciences. This he believes is not a conscious effort but is a result of the historical problem-based discourses out of which the disciplines developed, in which the divisions between the disciplines become increasingly fluid (Mills, 1959, 136–140). Thus, Mills sets out what he believed to be a problem-based approach to his conception of social sciences (140–142).

== On reason and freedom ==
=== The call to social scientists in the Fourth Epoch ===
Mills opens "On Reason and Freedom" with the two facets of the sociological imagination (history and biography) in relationship to the social scientist. Mills asserts that it is time for social scientists to address the troubles of the individual and the issues of society to better understand the state of freedom specific to this historical moment. According to Mills, understanding personal troubles in relationship to social structure is the task of the social scientist.

Mills goes on to situate the reader in the historically specific moment that he wrote the book, or what Mills refers to as the Fourth Epoch. Mills explains that "nowadays men everywhere seek to know where they stand, where they may be going, and what—if anything—they can do about the present as history and the future as responsibility" (165). To have a better understanding of the self and society, it is necessary to develop new ways of making sense of reality as old methods for understanding associated with liberalism and socialism are inadequate in this new epoch. Enlightenment promises associated with the previous epoch have failed; increased rationality moves society further away from freedom rather than closer to it.

=== The Cheerful Robot and freedom ===
Mills explains that highly rationalized organizations, such as bureaucracies, have increased in society; however, reason as used by the individual has not because the individual does not have the time or means to exercise reason. Mills differentiates reason and rationality. Reason, or that which is associated with critical and reflexive thought, can move individuals closer to freedom. On the other hand, rationality, which is associated with organization and efficiency, results in a lack of reason and the destruction of freedom. Despite this difference, rationality is often conflated with freedom.

Greater rationality in society, as understood by Mills, results in the rationalization of every facet of life for the individual until there is the loss "of his capacity and will to reason; it also affects his chances and his capacity to act as a free man" (170). This does not mean that individuals in society are unintelligent or hopeless. Mills is not suggesting determinism. Under Mills' conception, freedom is not totally absent as the "average" individual in society has "a real potential for freedom". Individuals have adapted to the rationalization of society. Mills believed in the individual's autonomy and potential to alter societal structures.

The individual who does not exercise reason and passively accepts their social position is referred to by Mills as "The Cheerful Robot" in which the individual is alienated from the self and society totally. Mills asks if, at some point and time in the future, individuals will accept this state of total rationality and alienation willingly and happily. This is a pressing concern as the Cheerful Robot is the "antithesis" of democratic society; the Cheerful Robot is the "ultimate problem of freedom" (175) as a threat to society's values. According to Mills, social scientists must study social structure, using the sociological imagination, to understand the state of freedom in this epoch. Mills concludes this section of The Sociological Imagination with a call to social scientists: it is the promise of the social sciences to analyze the individual's troubles and society's issues in order to not only evaluate freedom in society but to foster it.

== See also ==
- Sociological imagination
- The Power Elite

== Bibliography ==
- C Wright Mills, (1959), The Sociological Imagination, reprinted (2000), Oxford University, chapters 1-3 and 7, pages 3–75 and 132–143.
- John D Brewer, (2004), "Imagining The Sociological Imagination: The Biographical Context of a Sociological Classic", British Journal of Sociology, 55:3, pp. 319–333.
- John D Brewer, (2005), "The Public and The Private In C. Wright Mills Life and Work", Sociology 39:4, pp. 661–677.
- Michael Burawoy, (1991), Ethnography Unbound, University of California, chapters 1-2 and 13, pages 1–29 and 271–291.
- Michael Burawoy, (2005), "2004 American Sociological Presidential Address: For Public Sociology", British Journal of Sociology 56:2, pp. 260–294.
