= Allan Horwitz =

American sociologist

- Born: Allan Victor Horwitz; August 22, 1948 (age 78); Minneapolis, Minnesota
- Education: Dickinson College; Yale University
- Known for: Medical sociology
- Awards: Leonard Pearlin Award for Distinguished Lifetime Contributions to the Sociology of Mental Health from the American Sociological Association (2006)
- Scientific career
- Fields: Sociology
- Workplaces: Rutgers University
- Thesis: Social Networks and Pathways into Psychiatric Treatment (1975)

Allan Victor Horwitz (born August 22, 1948) is an American sociologist and medical sociologist whose research concerns mental illness, psychiatric diagnosis, medicalization, social control, and the relationship between social and biological explanations of human behavior. He is professor emeritus of sociology at Rutgers University, where he was a Board of Governors Professor and held administrative positions including dean of social and behavioral sciences and chair of the Department of Sociology.

== Early life and education ==
Horwitz was born in Minneapolis, Minnesota, in 1948. He received a bachelor's degree from Dickinson College in 1970 and subsequently studied sociology at Yale University, where he received an M.Phil. in 1973 and a Ph.D. in 1975. His doctoral dissertation was titled Social Networks and Pathways into Psychiatric Treatment.

== Academic career ==
Horwitz joined the sociology faculty at Rutgers College in 1974 as an instructor and became an assistant professor in 1975. He was promoted to associate professor in 1980 and professor in 1988. He later became a distinguished professor and was appointed Board of Governors Professor of Sociology in 2010. At Rutgers, Horwitz served as chair of the Department of Sociology and as dean for social and behavioral sciences in the School of Arts and Sciences from 2006 to 2011. He also served in leadership positions at the Rutgers Institute for Health, Health Care Policy, and Aging Research. Horwitz was a fellow-in-residence at the Netherlands Institute for Advanced Study in 2007–2008 and at the Center for Advanced Study in the Behavioral Sciences at Stanford University in 2012–2013.

== Research ==
Horwitz's work has focused primarily on the sociological study of mental health and mental illness. His early research examined social networks, help-seeking behavior, psychiatric treatment, social control, and the role of families in caring for people with serious mental illness. His later work increasingly examined the historical and social processes through which psychological distress becomes defined as mental disorder.

=== Mental illness and medicalization ===
In The Social Control of Mental Illness (1982) and Creating Mental Illness (2002), Horwitz examined mental illness as both a medical and social category. Creating Mental Illness argued that different forms of psychological distress cannot be understood solely through a disease model and emphasized the roles of social circumstances, cultural definitions, and processes of medicalization.

His work has also examined how social conditions influence the experience and classification of mental illness. His research on families and serious mental illness investigated social support, caregiving, and the distribution of responsibility for care among relatives.

=== Psychiatric diagnosis ===
A recurring theme in Horwitz's scholarship is the distinction between ordinary emotional responses and psychiatric disorders. In The Loss of Sadness, written with Jerome Wakefield, he argued that psychiatric diagnosis can classify normal sadness as depressive disorder when insufficient attention is paid to the circumstances in which symptoms arise. The book was reviewed in the American Journal of Psychiatry and the New England Journal of Medicine.

Horwitz and Wakefield extended this argument to anxiety in All We Have to Fear, examining the historical transformation of ordinary fear and anxiety into psychiatric categories. Horwitz's Anxiety: A Short History similarly traced changing understandings of anxiety from antiquity to modern psychiatry. The book was reviewed in the Bulletin of the History of Medicine and British Journal of Psychiatry.

=== History of psychiatry ===
Horwitz has written several historical studies of psychiatric concepts and diagnoses. PTSD: A Short History examined the development of post-traumatic stress disorder and the changing ways in which trauma-related psychological reactions have been understood and classified. The book was reviewed in the British Journal of Psychiatry and History of Psychiatry.

In Between Sanity and Madness, Horwitz presented a history of changing approaches to mental illness from ancient Greece through the development of modern neuroscience, with particular attention to psychiatry's changing explanatory frameworks and diagnostic practices.

=== DSM and psychiatric classification ===
Horwitz's DSM: A History of Psychiatry's Bible (2021) examined the history of the Diagnostic and Statistical Manual of Mental Disorders and the development of psychiatric classification in the United States. The book traces changes in the DSM from its early editions through DSM-5, emphasizing professional, social, cultural, and economic influences on psychiatric classification.

The book received reviews in several scholarly journals, including Social History of Medicine and the Journal of the History of the Behavioral Sciences. Jason Schnittker described Horwitz's approach as examining the DSM within a broad public sphere and considering the influence of social movements, pharmaceutical interests, and professional conflicts on diagnostic classification. The book was also reviewed in the Washington Post, which characterized it as a history of the development and social significance of the DSM and its diagnostic categories.

=== Biology and culture ===
In What's Normal? Reconciling Biology and Culture (2016), Horwitz examined the interaction between biological inheritance and cultural environments. Rather than treating biology and culture as competing explanations, the book considered how their relative influence varies across different behaviors and social settings.

== Recognition ==
Horwitz has held leadership positions in the American Sociological Association (ASA), including chair of its Mental Health Section and Medical Sociology Section. He has also chaired the Psychiatric Sociology Division of the Society for the Study of Social Problems.

In 2006, Horwitz received the Leonard I. Pearlin Award for distinguished contributions to the sociology of mental health from the ASA's section on sociology of mental health. In 2016, he received the Leo G. Reeder Award for distinguished contributions to medical sociology from the ASA's Medical Sociology Section.

Rutgers recognized Horwitz with the Daniel Gorenstein Memorial Award in 2013. He has also received Rutgers research and scholar-teacher awards and publication awards from sections of the American Sociological Association.

== Selected bibliography ==
- The Social Control of Mental Illness. Academic Press, 1982.
- The Logic of Social Control. Plenum Press, 1990.
- Creating Mental Illness. University of Chicago Press, 2002.
- The Loss of Sadness: How Psychiatry Transformed Normal Sorrow into Depressive Disorder. With Jerome Wakefield. Oxford University Press, 2007.
- Diagnosis, Therapy, and Evidence: Conundrums in Modern American Medicine. With Gerald N. Grob. Rutgers University Press, 2010.
- All We Have to Fear: Psychiatry's Transformation of Natural Anxieties into Mental Disorders. With Jerome Wakefield. Oxford University Press, 2012.
- Anxiety: A Short History. Johns Hopkins University Press, 2013.
- What's Normal? Reconciling Biology and Culture. Oxford University Press, 2016.
- PTSD: A Short History. Johns Hopkins University Press, 2018.
- Between Sanity and Madness: Mental Illness from Ancient Greece to the Era of Neuroscience. Oxford University Press, 2020.
- DSM: A History of Psychiatry's Bible. Johns Hopkins University Press, 2021.
- Personality and Its Disorders. Johns Hopkins University Press, 2022.
