= C. Wright Mills =

American sociologist (1916–1962)

- Born: Charles Wright Mills; August 28, 1916; Waco, Texas, U.S.
- Died: March 20, 1962 (aged 45); West Nyack, New York, U.S.
- Spouses: Dorothy Helen Smith (m. 1937; div. 1940; m. 1941; div. 1947); Ruth Harper (m. 1947; div. 1959); Yaroslava Surmach (m. 1959)
- Children: 3

Academic background
- Education: University of Texas at Austin (BA, MA); University of Wisconsin–Madison (PhD)
- Thesis: A Sociological Account of Pragmatism (1942)
- Doctoral advisor: Howard P. Becker; Edward Alsworth Ross
- Influences: John Dewey; William James; Paul Lazarsfeld; Karl Mannheim; Karl Marx; George Herbert Mead; Franz Neumann; Charles Sanders Peirce; Thorstein Veblen; Max Weber

Academic work
- Discipline: Sociology
- Sub-discipline: Political sociology
- School or tradition: New Left
- Institutions: University of Maryland; Columbia University
- Notable students: Morris Rosenberg
- Notable works: White Collar (1951); The Power Elite (1956); The Sociological Imagination (1959)
- Notable ideas: Elite theory; sociological imagination; criticism of abstract empiricism; coining the term grand theory
- Influenced: Stanley Cohen; G. William Domhoff; Tom Hayden; Rosabeth Moss Kanter; Ralph Miliband; Teodor Shanin; William Appleman Williams; Jock Young

Charles Wright Mills (August 28, 1916 – March 20, 1962) was an American sociologist, and a professor of sociology at Columbia University from 1946 until his death in 1962. Mills published widely in both popular and intellectual journals, and is remembered for several books, such as The Power Elite, White Collar: The American Middle Classes, and The Sociological Imagination, which was in 1998 named by the International Sociological Association as the second most important sociological book of the 20th century.

Mills was concerned with the responsibilities of intellectuals in post–World War II society, and he advocated public and political engagement over disinterested observation. One of Mills's biographers, Daniel Geary, writes that Mills's writings had a "particularly significant impact on New Left social movements of the 1960s era." It was Mills who popularized the term "New Left" in the U.S., in a 1960 open letter "Letter to the New Left".

== Biography ==
=== Early life ===
C. Wright Mills was born in Waco, Texas, on August 28, 1916. His father, Charles Grover Mills (1889–1973), worked as an insurance broker, leaving his family to constantly move around; his mother, Frances Ursula (Wright) Mills (1893–1989), was a homemaker. His parents were pious and middle class, with an Irish-English background. Mills was a choirboy in the Catholic Church of Waco, and he developed a lifelong aversion to Christianity. Although being brought up in an Anglo-Irish Catholic family, Mills strayed away from the church, defining himself as an atheist. Mills attended Dallas Technical High School, with an interest in engineering, and his parents were preparing him for a practical career in a rapidly industrializing world of Texas. His focuses of study besides engineering were algebra, physics, and mechanical drawing.

=== Education ===
In 1934, Mills graduated from Dallas Technical High School, and his father pressed him to attend Texas A&M University. To fulfill his father's wishes, Mills attended the university, but he found the atmosphere "suffocating" and left after his first year. He transferred to the University of Texas at Austin where he studied anthropology, social psychology, sociology, and philosophy. At this time, the university was developing a strong department of graduate instruction in both the social and physical sciences. Mills' benefited from this unique development, and he impressed professors with his powerful intellect. In 1939, he graduated with a bachelor's degree in sociology, as well as a master's in philosophy. By the time he graduated, he had already been published in the two leading sociology journals, the American Sociological Review and The American Journal of Sociology.

While studying at Texas, Mills met his first wife, Dorothy Helen Smith, a fellow student seeking a master's degree in sociology. She had previously attended Oklahoma College for Women, where she graduated with a bachelor's degree in commerce.

After their marriage, in 1937, Dorothy Helen, or "Freya", worked as a staff member of the director of the Women's Residence Hall at the University of Texas. She supported the couple while Mills completed his graduate work; she also typed, copied and edited much of his work, including his Ph.D. dissertation. There, he met Hans Gerth, a German political refugee and a professor in the Department of Sociology. Although Mills did not take any courses with him, Gerth became a mentor and close friend. Together, Mills and Gerth translated and edited a few of Max Weber's works. Both collaborated on Character and Social Structure, a social psychology text. This work combined Mills's understanding of socialization from his work in American Pragmatisim and Gerth's understanding of past and present societies.

Mills received his Ph.D. in sociology from the University of Wisconsin–Madison in 1942. His dissertation was entitled A Sociological Account of Pragmatism: An Essay on the Sociology of Knowledge. Mills refused to revise his dissertation while it was reviewed by his committee. It was later accepted without approval from the review committee. Mills worked as a Professor of Sociology at the University of Maryland, College Park from 1942 to 1945.

=== Early career ===
Before Mills furthered his career, he avoided the draft by failing his physical due to high blood pressure and received a deferment. He was divorced from Freya in August 1940, but after a year he convinced Freya to change her mind. The couple remarried in March 1941. A few years later, their daughter, Pamela Mills, was born on January 15, 1943. During this time, his work as an associate professor of sociology from 1941 until 1945 at the University of Maryland, College Park, Mills's awareness and involvement in American politics grew. During World War II, Mills befriended the historians Richard Hofstadter, Frank Freidel, and Ken Stampp. The four academics collaborated on many topics, and each wrote about contemporary issues of the war and how it affected American society.

While still at the University of Maryland, Mills began contributing "journalistic sociology" and opinion pieces to intellectual journals such as The New Republic, The New Leader, as well as Politics, a journal established by his friend Dwight Macdonald in 1944.

During his time at the University of Maryland, William Form befriended Mills and quickly recognized that "work overwhelmingly dominated" Mills's life. Mills continued his work with Gerth while trying to publish Weber's "Class, Status, and Parties". Form explains that Mills was determined to improve his writing after receiving criticism on one of his works; "Setting his portable Corona on the large coffee table in the living room, he would type triple-spaced on coarse yellow paper, revising the manuscript by writing between the lines with a sharp pencil. Unscrambling the additions and changes could present a formidable challenge. Each day before leaving for campus, he left a manuscript for Freya to retype."

In 1945, Mills moved to New York after earning a research associate position at Columbia University's Bureau of Applied Social Research. He separated from Freya with this move, and the couple later divorced a second time in 1947.

Mills was appointed assistant professor in the university's sociology department in 1946. Mills received a grant of $2,500 from the Guggenheim Foundation in April 1945 to fund his research in 1946. During that time, he wrote White Collar, which was later published in 1951.

In 1946, Mills published From Max Weber: Essays in Sociology, a translation of Weber's essays co-authored with Hans Gerth. In 1953, the two published a second work, Character and Social Structure: The Psychology of Social Institutions.

In 1947, Mills married his second wife, Ruth Harper, a statistician at the Bureau of Applied Social Research. She worked with Mills on New Men of Power (1948), White Collar (1951), and The Power Elite (1956). In 1949, Mills and Harper moved to Chicago so that Mills could serve as a visiting professor at the University of Chicago. Mills returned to teaching at Columbia University after a quarter at the University of Chicago, and was promoted to associate professor of Sociology on July 1, 1950. In only six years, Mills was promoted to Professor of Sociology at Columbia on July 1, 1956.

In 1955, Harper gave birth to their daughter Kathryn. From 1956 to 1957, the family moved to Copenhagen, where Mills acted as a Fulbright lecturer at the University of Copenhagen. Mills and Harper separated in December 1957 and officially divorced in 1959.

=== Later career ===
Mills married his third wife, Yaroslava Surmach, an American artist of Ukrainian descent, and settled in Rockland County, New York, in 1959. Their son, Nikolas Charles, was born on June 19, 1960.

In August 1960, Mills spent time in Cuba, where he worked on developing his text Listen, Yankee. He spent 16 days there, interviewing Cuban government officials and Cuban civilians. Mills asked them questions about whether the guerrilla organization that made the revolution was the same as a political party. Additionally, Mills interviewed President Fidel Castro, who claimed to have read and studied Mills's The Power Elite. Although Mills spent only a short amount of his time in Cuba with Castro, they got along well and Castro sent flowers when Mills died a few years later. Mills was a supporter of the Fair Play for Cuba Committee.

Mills was described as a man in a hurry. Aside from his hurried nature, he was largely known for his combativeness. Both his private life – four marriages to three women, a child with each, and several affairs – and his professional life, which involved challenging and criticizing many of his professors and coworkers, have been characterized as "tumultuous." He wrote a fairly obvious, though slightly veiled, essay in which he criticized the former chairman of the Wisconsin department, and called the senior theorist there, Howard P. Becker, a "real fool."

During a visit to the Soviet Union, Mills was honored as a major critic of American society. While there he criticized censorship in the Soviet Union through his toast to an early Soviet leader who was "purged and murdered by the Stalinists." He toasted "To the day when the complete works of Leon Trotsky are published in the Soviet Union!"

=== Health ===
C. Wright Mills struggled with poor health due to his heart. After receiving his doctorate in 1942, Mills had failed his Army physical exam due to having high blood pressure. Because of this he was excused from serving in the United States military during World War II.

=== Death ===
In a biography of Mills by Irving Louis Horowitz, the author writes about Mills's acute awareness of his heart condition. He speculates that it affected the way he lived his adult life. Mills was described as someone who worked quickly, yet efficiently. Horowitz suggests that Mills worked at a fast pace because he felt that he would not live long, describing him as "a man in search of his destiny". In 1942, Mills' wife Freya had characterized him as being in excellent health and having no heart issue. His cardiac problem was not identified until 1956, and he did not have a major heart attack until December 1960, despite his excessive blood pressure. In 1962, Mills suffered his fourth and final heart attack at the age of 45, and died on March 20 in West Nyack, New York. Roughly fifteen months prior, Mills's doctors had warned him that his next heart attack would be his last one. His service was held at Columbia University, where Hans Gerth and Daniel Bell both travelled to speak on his behalf. A service for friends and family was held at the interfaith pacifist Fellowship of Reconciliation in Nyack.

== Relationships to other theorists ==
Mills was an intense student of philosophy before he became a sociologist. His vision of radical, egalitarian democracy was a direct result of the influence of ideas from Thorstein Veblen, John Dewey, and Mead. During his time at the University of Wisconsin, Mills was deeply influenced by Hans Gerth, a sociology professor from Germany. Mills gained an insight into European learning and sociological theory from Gerth.

Mills and Gerth began their thirteen-year collaboration in 1940. Almost immediately, Gerth expressed his doubts about working collaboratively with Mills. He ended up being right, as they had critical tensions in their collaboration in relation to intellectual ethics. They both recruited advocates to support their sides, and they used ethical positions as a weapon. They still worked together though, and each had their own jobs within the collaboration. Mills worked out a division of labor, edited, organized and rewrote Gerth's drafts. Gerth interpreted and translated the German material. Their first publication together was "A Marx for the Managers", which was a critique of The Managerial Revolution: What is Happening in the World by James Burnham. Mills and Gerth took most of their position from German sources. They had their disagreements, yet they grew a partnership and became fruitful collaborators who worked together for a long time to create influential viewpoints for the field of sociology.

C. Wright Mills was strongly influenced by pragmatism, specifically the works of George Herbert Mead, John Dewey, Charles Sanders Peirce, and William James. Although it is commonly recognized that Mills was influenced by Karl Marx and Thorstein Veblen, the social structure aspects of Mills's works are shaped largely by Max Weber and the writing of Karl Mannheim, who followed Weber's work closely. Max Weber's works contributed greatly to Mills's view of the world overall. Being one of Weber's students, Mills's work focuses a great deal on rationalism. Mills also acknowledged a general influence of Marxism; he noted that Marxism had become an essential tool for sociologists, and therefore all must naturally be educated on the subject; any Marxist influence was then a result of sufficient education. Neo-Freudianism also helped shape Mills's work.

== Outlook ==
"I do not believe that social science will 'save the world', although I see nothing at all wrong with 'trying to save the world' ... If there are any ways out of the crises of our period by means of intellect, is it not up to the social scientist to state them? ... It is on the level of human awareness that virtually all solutions to great problems must now lie" – Mills 1959:193

There has long been debate over Mills's intellectual outlook. Mills is often seen as a "closet Marxist" because of his emphasis on social classes and their roles in historical progress, as well as his attempt to keep Marxist traditions alive in social theory. Just as often, however, others argue Mills more closely identified with the work of Max Weber, whom many sociologists interpret as an exemplar of sophisticated (and intellectually adequate) anti-Marxism and modern liberalism. However, Mills clearly gives precedence to social structure described by the political, economic and military institutions, and not culture, which is presented in its massified form as a means to the ends sought by the power elite. Therefore, placing him firmly in the Marxist and not Weberian camp, so much so that in his collection of classical essays, Weber's "The Protestant Ethic and the Spirit of Capitalism" is not included. Although Mills embraced Weber's idea of bureaucracy as internalized social control, as was the historicity of his method, he was far from liberalism (being its critic). Mills was a radical who was culturally forced to distance himself from Marx while being "near" him.

While Mills never embraced the "Marxist" label, he told his closest associates that he felt much closer to what he saw as the best currents of a flexible humanist Marxism than to alternatives. He considered himself a "plain Marxist", working in the spirit of young Marx as he claims in his collected essays: "Power, Politics and People" (Oxford University Press, 1963). In a November 1956 letter to his friends Bette and Harvey Swados, Mills declared "[i]n the meantime, let's not forget that there's more [that's] still useful in even the Sweezy (Note: Paul M. Sweezy was the founder of Monthly Review magazine, "an independent socialist magazine".) kind of Marxism than in all the routineers of J. S. Mill (Note: a liberal intellectual.) put together."

There is an important quotation from Letters to Tovarich (an autobiographical essay) dated Fall 1957 titled "On Who I Might Be and How I Got That Way":

You've asked me, 'What might you be?' Now I answer you: 'I am a Wobbly.' I mean this spiritually and politically. In saying this I refer less to political orientation than to political ethos, and I take Wobbly to mean one thing: the opposite of bureaucrat. ... I am a Wobbly, personally, down deep, and for good. I am outside the whale, and I got that way through social isolation and self-help. But do you know what a Wobbly is? It's a kind of spiritual condition. Don't be afraid of the word, Tovarich. A Wobbly is not only a man who takes orders from himself. He's also a man who's often in the situation where there are no regulations to fall back upon that he hasn't made up himself. He doesn't like bosses—capitalistic or communistic—they are all the same to him. He wants to be, and he wants everyone else to be, his own boss at all times under all conditions and for any purposes they may want to follow up. This kind of spiritual condition, and only this, is Wobbly freedom. (Note: Wobblies are members of the Industrial Workers of the World (IWW), and the direct action they are favouring includes passive resistance, strikes, and boycotts. They want to build a new society according to general socialist principles but they are refusing to endorse any socialist party or any other kind of political party.)

These two quotations are the ones chosen by Kathryn Mills for the better acknowledgement of his nuanced thinking.

It appears that Mills understood his position as being much closer to Marx than to Weber but influenced by both, as Stanley Aronowitz argued in "A Mills Revival?".

Mills argues that micro and macro levels of analysis can be linked together by the sociological imagination, which enables its possessor to understand the large historical sense in terms of its meaning for the inner life and the external career of a variety of individuals. Individuals can only understand their own experiences fully if they locate themselves within their period of history. The key factor is the combination of private problems with public issues: the combination of troubles that occur within the individual's immediate milieu and relations with other people with matters that have to do with institutions of an historical society as a whole.

Mills shares with Marxist sociology and other "conflict theorists" the view that American society is sharply divided and systematically shaped by the relationship between the powerful and powerless. He also shares their concerns for alienation, the effects of social structure on the personality, and the manipulation of people by elites and the mass media. Mills combined such conventional Marxian concerns with careful attention to the dynamics of personal meaning and small-group motivations, topics for which Weberian scholars are more noted.

Mills had a very combative outlook regarding and towards many parts of his life, the people in it, and his works. In that way, he was a self-proclaimed outsider: "I am an outlander, not only regionally, but deep down and for good."

Above all, Mills understood sociology, when properly approached, as an inherently political endeavor and a servant of the democratic process. In The Sociological Imagination, Mills wrote:

It is the political task of the social scientist – as of any liberal educator – continually to translate personal troubles into public issues, and public issues into the terms of their human meaning for a variety of individuals. It is his task to display in his work – and, as an educator, in his life as well – this kind of sociological imagination. And it is his purpose to cultivate such habits of mind among the men and women who are publicly exposed to him. To secure these ends is to secure reason and individuality, and to make these the predominant values of a democratic society.

— C. Wright Mills, The Sociological Imagination, page 187

Contemporary American scholar Cornel West argued in his text American Evasion of Philosophy that Mills follows the tradition of pragmatism. Mills shared Dewey's goal of a "creative democracy" and emphasis on the importance of political practice but criticized Dewey for his inattention to the rigidity of power structure in the U.S. Mills's dissertation was titled Sociology and Pragmatism: The Higher Learning in America, and West categorized him along with pragmatists in his time Sidney Hook and Reinhold Niebuhr as thinkers during pragmatism's "mid-century crisis."

== Mills's critique of sociology at the time ==
While a sociologist himself, Mills was still quite critical of the sociological approach during his time. In fact, scholars saw The Sociological Imagination as "Mills' final break with academic sociology." In the process of laying out the eponymous theory of sociological imagination, Mills was critical of specific people, criticizing Talcott Parsons' theories and the work of Paul Lazarsfeld, a member of his department at Columbia. In the book, Mills criticizes the so called "grand theories" – Parsons' theory being a par excellence example of these – sociological approaches that attempt to construct universal theories of society through highly abstract concepts, prioritizing hypothetical descriptions of social behavior over the study of actual people and real social interactions.

Mills argues that grand theories, despite elaborativeness and famously complex structures, had very little substantive insight to offer about how society actually functions. Moreover, he contended that their overwhelming complexity served an ideological function: in the case of Parsons, whose theory was enjoying peak popularity at the time of publication, the dense language acted to conceal what Mills saw as the theory's inherent conservatism. To demonstrate this, Mills famously offered a point-by-point "translation" of lengthy passages from Parsons into plain English, arguing that the theoretical content amounted to very little once stripped of its jargon. The influence of Mills' critique proved far-reaching. In 1998, the International Sociological Association, asked its members to name the five most influential sociological books of the 20th century; The Sociological Imagination placed second.

Nonetheless, while The Sociological Imagination was and still is sometimes read as "an attack on empirical research" it is much closer to "a critique of a certain research style." Mills was worried about sociology falling into the traps of normative thinking and ceasing to be a critic of social life. Throughout his academic career, Mills fought with mainstream sociology about different conflicting sociological styles, being primarily worried about social sciences becoming susceptible to the "power and prestige of normative culture" and veering away from its original objective. Up until his death, Mills fought to maintain what he thought was the integrity of sociology.

== Published work ==
From Max Weber: Essays in Sociology (1946) was edited and translated in collaboration with Gerth. Mills and Gerth had begun collaborating in 1940, selected a few of Weber's original German text, and translated them into English. The preface of the book begins by explaining the disputable difference of meaning that English words give to German writing. The authors attempt to explain their devotion to being as accurate as possible in translating Weber's writing.

The New Men of Power: America's Labor Leaders (1948) studies the "Labor Metaphysic" and the dynamic of labor leaders cooperating with business officials. The book concludes that the labor movement had effectively renounced its traditional oppositional role and become reconciled to life within a capitalist system.

The Puerto Rican Journey (1950), published in New York, was written in collaboration with Clarence Senior and Rose Kohn Goldsen. Clarence Senior was a Socialist Political activist who specialized in Puerto Rican affairs. Rose Kohn Goldsen was a sociology professor at Cornell University who studied the social effects of television and popular culture. The book documents a methodological study and does not address a theoretical sociological framework.

White Collar: The American Middle Classes (1951) offers a rich historical account of the middle classes in the United States and contends that bureaucracies have overwhelmed middle-class workers, robbing them of all independent thought and turning them into near-automatons, oppressed but cheerful. Mills states there are three types of power within the workplace: coercion or physical force; authority; and manipulation. Through this piece, the thoughts of Mills and Weber seem to coincide in their belief that Western Society is trapped within the iron cage of bureaucratic rationality, which would lead society to focus more on rationality and less on reason. Mills's fear was that the middle class was becoming "politically emasculated and culturally stultified," which would allow a shift in power from the middle class to the strong social elite. Middle-class workers receive an adequate salary but have become alienated from the world because of their inability to affect or change it. Frank W. Elwell describes this work as "an elaboration and update on Weber's bureaucratization process, detailing the effects of the increasing division of labor on the tone and character of American social life."

Character and Social Structure (1953) was co-authored with Gerth. This was considered his most theoretically sophisticated work. Mills later came into conflict with Gerth, though Gerth positively referred to him as, "an excellent operator, a whippersnapper, promising young man on the make, and Texas cowboy à la ride and shoot." Generally speaking, Character and Social Structure combines the social behaviorism and personality structure of pragmatism with the social structure of Weberian sociology. It is centered on roles, how they are interpersonal, and how they are related to institutions.

The Power Elite (1956) describes the relationships among the political, military, and economic elites, noting that they share a common world view; that power rests in the centralization of authority within the elites of American society. The centralization of authority is made up of the following components: a "military metaphysic", in other words a military definition of reality; "class identity", recognizing themselves as separate from and superior to the rest of society; "interchangeability" (they move within and between the three institutional structures and hold interlocking positions of power therein); cooperation/socialization, in other words, socialization of prospective new members is done based on how well they "clone" themselves socially after already established elites. Mills's view on the power elite is that they represent their own interest, which include maintaining a "permanent war economy" to control the ebbs and flow of American Capitalism and the masking of "a manipulative social and political order through the mass media." Additionally, this work can be described as "an exploration of rational-legal bureaucratic authority and its effects on the wielders and subjects of this power." President Dwight D. Eisenhower referenced Mills and this book in his farewell address of 1961. He warned about the dangers of a "military-industrial complex" as he had slowed the push for increased military defense in his time as president for two terms. This idea of a "military-industrial complex" is a reference to Mills' writing in The Power Elite, showing what influence this book had on certain powerful figures.

The Causes of World War Three (1958) and Listen, Yankee (1960) were important works that followed. In both, Mills attempts to create a moral voice for society and make the power elite responsible to the "public". Although Listen, Yankee was considered highly controversial, it was an exploration of the Cuban Revolution written from the viewpoint of a Cuban revolutionary and was a very innovative style of writing for that period in American history. In his paper on Mills's work, Elwell describes The Causes of World War Three as a jeremiad on Weber's ideas, particularly that of "crackpot realism": "the disjunction between institutional rationality and human reason".

The Sociological Imagination (1959), which is considered Mills's most influential book, (Note: The Sociological Imagination ranked second (outranked only by Max Weber's Economy and Society) in a 1997 survey asking members of the International Sociological Association to identify the books published in the 20th century most influential on sociologists.) describes a mindset for studying sociology, the sociological imagination, that stresses being able to connect individual experiences and societal relationships. The three components that form the sociological imagination are history, biography, and social structure. Mills asserts that a critical task for social scientists is to "translate personal troubles into public issues". The distinction between troubles and issues is that troubles relate to how a single person feels about something while issues refer to how a society affects groups of people. For instance, a man who cannot find employment is experiencing a trouble, while a city with a massive unemployment rate makes it not just a personal trouble but a public issue. This book helped the "penetration of a field by a new generation of social scientists dedicated to problems of social change rather than system maintenance". Mills bridged the gap between truth and purpose in sociology. Another important part of this book is the interpersonal relations Mills talks about, specifically marriage and divorce. Mills rejects all external class attempts at change because he sees them as a contradiction to the sociological imagination. Mills had a lot of sociologists talk about his book, and the feedback was varied. Mills' writing can be seen as a critique of some of his colleagues, which resulted in the book generating a large debate. His critique of the sociological profession is one that was monumental in the field of sociology and that got lots of attention as his most famous work. One can interpret Mills's claim in The Sociological Imagination as the difficulty humans have in balancing biography and history, personal challenges and societal issues. Sociologists, then, rightly connect their autobiographical, personal challenges to social institutions. Social scientists should then connect those institutions to social structures and locate them within a historical narrative.

The version of Images of Man: The Classic Tradition in Sociological Thinking (1960) worked on by C. Wright Mills is simply an edited copy with the addition of an introduction written himself. Through this work, Mills explains that he believes the use of models is the characteristic of classical sociologists, and that these models are the reason classical sociologists maintain relevance.

The Marxists (1962) takes Mills's explanation of sociological models from Images of Man and uses it to criticize modern liberalism and Marxism. He believes that the liberalist model does not work and cannot create an overarching view of society, but rather it is more of an ideology for the entrepreneurial middle class. Marxism, however, may be incorrect in its overall view, but it has a working model for societal structure, the mechanics of the history of society, and the roles of individuals. One of Mills's problems with the Marxist model is that it uses units that are small and autonomous, which he finds too simple to explain capitalism. Mills then provides discussion on Marx as a determinist.

== Legacy ==
According to Stephen Scanlan and Liz Grauerholz, writing in 2009, Mills's thinking on the intersection of biography and history continued to influence scholars and their work, and also impacted the way they interacted with and taught their students. The "International Sociological Association recognized The Sociological Imagination as second on its list of the 'Books of the Century'".

At his memorial service, Hans Gerth (Mills's coauthor and coeditor) referred to Mills as his "alter ego", despite the many disagreements they had. Interestingly, many of Mills's close friends "reminisced about their earlier friendship and later estrangement when Mills mocked them for supporting the status quo and their conservative universities." In addition to the impact Mills left on those in his life, his legacy can also be seen through the prominence of his work after his passing. William Form describes a 2005 survey of the eleven best selling texts and in these Mills was referenced 69 times, far more than any other prominent author. Frank W. Elwell, in his paper "The Sociology of C. Wright Mills" further explains the legacy Mills left as he "writes about issues and problems that matter to people, not just to other sociologists, and he writes about them in a way to further our understanding." His work is not just useful to students of sociology, but the general population as well. Mills tackled relevant topics such as the growth of white collar jobs, the role of bureaucratic power, as well as the Cold War and the spread of communism.

In 1964, the Society for the Study of Social Problems established the C. Wright Mills Award for the book that "best exemplifies outstanding social science research and a great mutual understanding of the individual and society in the tradition of the distinguished sociologist, C. Wright Mills."
