= Grand theory =

Term in sociology used initially to deride structural functionalism

Grand theory is a term coined by the American sociologist C. Wright Mills in The Sociological Imagination to refer to the form of highly abstract theorizing in which the formal organization and arrangement of concepts takes priority over understanding the social reality. In his view, grand theory is more or less separate from concrete concerns of everyday life and its variety in time and space.

Mills' main target was Talcott Parsons, also an American sociologist and the architect of structural functionalism, against whom Mills insisted that there is no grand theory in the sense of one universal scheme to understand the unity of social structures. In Mills' view "grand theory" integrated not only sociological concepts, but also psychological, economic, political, and religious or philosophical components. He tried to integrate all the social sciences within an overarching theoretical framework.

By the 1980s, grand theory was reformulated to include theories such as critical theory, structuralism, structural Marxism, and structuration theory – all influenced human geography. Barnes and Gregory confirmed this, and noticed in addition, "No matter the phenomenon investigated, it could always be slotted into a wider theoretical scheme. Nothing would be left out; everything would be explained."

Gregory puts forth two critical responses to this (reformulated) grand theory. First, there has been continuing debate about the scope of theory in human geography, with the focus on the relation between theory and empiricism. Some authors thought of a "theory-less world of empiricism", in contrast to others who foresaw a fixation on theory – meaning the threat of the "theorization of theories", second-order abstractions twice removed from the empirical world. Secondly, no single theoretical system can possibly ask all the interesting questions or provide all the satisfying answers.

A third response, such as in engaged theory and global studies, has been to carry forward the aspiration to understand the "social whole", but without the totalizing claims of "grand theory". One social theorist talks of the search as:

... to find a pathway between and beyond the modern confidence in grand theory and the postmodern rejection of other than piece-meal explanations for this and that discursive practice. It does so, not by setting up a grand theory, but by setting up a sensitizing and generalizing "grand method" to explore the structures and subjectivities of social formations that traverse history as we know it.

As a type of theoretical structure, the priority in developing this type of theory is on the higher-order organization of its ideas, rather than in 'testing' for the truth of its ideas through close contact with empirical reality (e.g. in light of data collected based on these ideas). For example, in the (re)emerging field of systems thinking for understanding complex systems, this type of theory has been used as part of an overarching conceptual framework for distributed cognition based explanation of data, insights, and phenomena relating to information communication in safety incidents and accidents.

== See also ==
- Middle-range theory (sociology)
