= The Power Elite =

1956 book by C. Wright Mills

- First edition, 1956
- Author: C. Wright Mills
- Language: English
- Subject: Sociology
- Publisher: Oxford University Press
- Publication date: April 19, 1956
- Publication place: United States
- OCLC: 271056

The Power Elite is a 1956 book by sociologist C. Wright Mills, in which Mills calls attention to the interwoven interests of the leaders of the military, corporate, and political elements of the American society and suggests that the ordinary citizen in modern times is a relatively powerless subject of manipulation by those three entities.

== Background ==
The book is something of a counterpart of Mills's 1951 work, White Collar: The American Middle Classes, which examines the then-growing role of middle managers in American society. A main inspiration for the book was Franz Leopold Neumann's book Behemoth: The Structure and Practice of National Socialism in 1942, a study of how Nazism came into a position of power in a democratic state like Germany. Behemoth had a strong influence on Mills.

== Summary ==
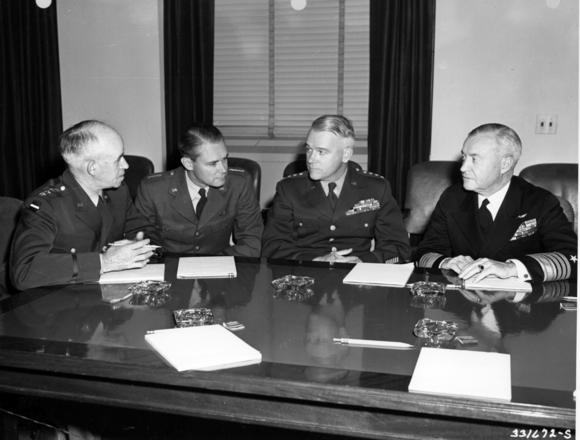
The Joint Chiefs of Staff, pictured here in 1949, are one of six ruling elites Mills identified.

According to Mills, the eponymous "power elite" are those that occupy the dominant positions, in the three pillar institutions (state security, economic and political) of a dominant country. Their decisions (or lack thereof) have enormous consequences, not only for Americans but, "the underlying populations of the world." Mills posits that the institutions that they head are a triumvirate of groups that have inherited or succeeded weaker predecessors:

1. "two or three hundred giant corporations" which have replaced the traditional agrarian and craft economy,
2. a strong federal political order that has inherited power from "a decentralized set of several dozen states" and "now enters into each and every cranny of the social structure," and
3. the military establishment, formerly an object of "distrust fed by state militia," but now an entity with "all the grim and clumsy efficiency of a sprawling bureaucratic domain."

Importantly and as distinct from modern American conspiracy theory, Mills explains that the elite themselves may not be aware of their status as an elite, noting that "often they are uncertain about their roles" and "without conscious effort, they absorb the aspiration to be... The Ones Who Decide." Nonetheless, he sees them as a quasi-hereditary caste. The members of the power elite, according to Mills, often enter into positions of societal prominence through educations obtained at eastern establishment universities like Harvard, Princeton, and Yale. But, Mills notes, "Harvard or Yale or Princeton is not enough... the point is not Harvard, but which Harvard?"

Mills identifies two classes of Ivy League alumni: those who were initiated into an upper echelon fraternity such as the Harvard College social clubs of Porcellian or Fly Club, and those who were not. Those so initiated, Mills continues, receive their invitations based on social links first established in elite private preparatory academies, where they were enrolled as part of family traditions and family connections. In that manner, the mantle of the elite is generally passed down along familial lines over the generations.

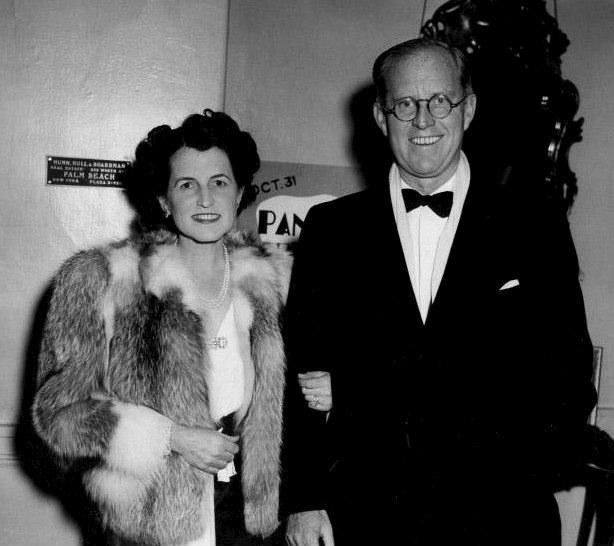
Historically prominent families, such as the Kennedy family, form the "Metropolitan 400". Shown here are Rose and Joseph Kennedy in 1940.

The resulting elites, who control the three dominant institutions (military, economy and political system) can be generally grouped into one of six types, according to Mills:

- the "Metropolitan 400:" members of historically-notable local families in the principal American cities who are generally represented on the Social Register
- "Celebrities:" prominent entertainers and media personalities
- the "Chief Executives:" presidents and CEOs of the most important companies within each industrial sector
- the "Corporate Rich:" major landowners and corporate shareholders
- the "Warlords:" senior military officers, most importantly the Joint Chiefs of Staff
- the "Political Directorate:" "fifty-odd men of the executive branch" of the U.S. federal government, including the senior leadership in the Executive Office of the President, who are sometimes variously drawn from elected officials of the Democratic and Republican parties but are usually professional government bureaucrats

Mills formulated a very short summary of his book: "Who, after all, runs America? No one runs it altogether, but in so far as any group does, the power elite."

== Reception and criticism ==
Commenting on The Power Elite, Arthur M. Schlesinger Jr. derisively said, "I look forward to the time when Mr. Mills hands back his prophet's robes and settles down to being a sociologist again." Adolf Berle noted the book contained "an uncomfortable degree of truth", but Mills presented "an angry cartoon, not a serious picture". Dennis Wrong described The Power Elite as "an uneven blend of journalism, sociology, and moral indignation". A review of the book in the Louisiana Law Review bemoaned that the "practical danger of Mr. Mills' pessimistic interpretation of the current situation is that his readers will concentrate on answering his prejudicial assertions rather than ponder the results of his really formidable research". Consideration of the book has become moderately more favorable. In 2006, G. William Domhoff wrote, "Mills looks even better than he did 50 years ago". Mills' biographer, John Summers, opined that book's historical value "seems assured".

== See also ==
- Elite theory
- Friendly Fascism, 1980 book
- Iron law of oligarchy
- Mass society
- Military-industrial complex
- New Left
- Power (social and political)
- Social alienation
