= Social phenomenon =

Phenomenon involving multiple organisms reacting to each other

Social phenomenon (singular) or social phenomena are any behaviours, actions, or events that takes place because of social influence, including from contemporary as well as historical societal influences. They are often a result of multifaceted processes that add ever increasing dimensions as they operate through individual nodes of people. Because of this, social phenomena are inherently dynamic and operate within a specific time and historical context.

Social phenomena are observable, measurable data. Psychological notions may drive them, but those notions are not directly observable; only the phenomena that express them.

== See also ==
- Phenomenological sociology
- Sociological imagination
- Viral phenomenon
