= Donald Black (sociologist) =

American sociologist (1941–2024)

Donald Black (1941 – January 30, 2024) was an American sociologist of law who was a university professor of the social sciences at the University of Virginia until his retirement in 2016. Black received his Ph.D. in sociology from the University of Michigan in 1968, and he taught at the law schools of both Yale and Harvard before moving to Virginia in 1985.

Black authored The Behavior of Law, The Manners and Customs of the Police, and Sociological Justice, all of which present various aspects of his theory of law. More recently, The Social Structure of Right and Wrong extended his theory to address conflict management more broadly, focusing on instances where people handle conflicts through means other than the law, such as through gossip, avoidance, suicide, or feuding. Black's latest book, Moral Time, identified the causes of moral conflict in all human relationships.

Black also founded pure sociology, a distinctive theoretical approach that explains human behavior with its social geometry. Since pure sociology is a general sociological paradigm, it may be applied to subjects other than law, conflict, and conflict management—for example, art, religion, and ideas.

Black died on January 30, 2024.

== See also ==
- Legal behavior
