= Dynamic social theory =

Dynamic social theory (DST) is the hypothesis that institutions and enduring patterns of behaviour function as "dynamic theories" or "real-time social models". They can be seen as the social science equivalent of theories in the natural sciences because they embody a great deal of knowledge of how society works and act as models that are replicated or adapted to achieve predictable outsomes. Proposed by Titus Alexander, DST aims to increase the effectiveness of social and political sciences by focusing research on innovating or improving social models to better solve societal problems, similar to how natural sciences use theories to solve problems in the material world. This approach sees social institutions not as static rules, but as evolving models of behavior and knowledge that people adapt in response to new challenges and beliefs.

== Background and context ==
The development of dynamic social theory is a response to the inherent difficulties faced by social science in creating lasting theoretical models. These difficulties are partly because societies are reflexive, meaning theories can influence behaviour and cease to be relevant over time, and because societies are immensely complex. It addresses recurring critiques of academic social science from within the profession, such as Charles Lindblom and David Cohen's analysis in 1979 of "the relatively thoughtless wastefulness" of much social research that is "a positive obstruction to social problem solving", the eminent sociologist Jonathan Turner's observation in 2001 that research "has become increasingly an end in itself without reference to the accumulation of knowledge or to the theoretical cumulation that comes with systematic tests of theories", Bent Flyvbjerg's detailed "Why social science has failed as a science" in 2001 William Starbuck wrote "Hundreds of thousands of talented researchers are producing little of lasting value" because they are focused on producing journal articles rather than knowledge (2006). as well as Matt Grossman's comment in 2021 that "Academia in general and social science in particular have lost public esteem and come under criticism for failing to live up to their promise."

DST was first introduced as a challenge to George Ritzer's famous McDonaldization thesis, arguing that its model of sociology "does not enable people to solve social problems or improve society. If anything, it paralyzes people into believing McDonaldization is an unstoppable behemoth they are powerless to influence." Alexander argues that "social research can empower people to improve society by working on institutions as social models" and bend Weber's "iron cage" to create more humane and responsive institutions. He points to alternative models to McDonald's, such as the Toyota model based on systems thinking, Buurtzorg's non-hierarchical model of social care, and cooperatives.

== Core hypotheses ==
Dynamic social theory is structured around three linked hypotheses aimed at increasing the effectiveness of social and political science:

- Institutions as Experiments: All human institutions and behaviours are everyday social experiments, tested in reality, that can be improved through reflective practice, social research and social action.
- Institutions as Dynamic Theories: Institutions embody collective knowledge about how to operate in society, much of it developed over centuries or even millennia, which are replicated, adapted or replaced.
- The Democratic Method: In open societies, all institutions (social models) are ultimately subject to democratic scrutiny and "peer review" by the public, so that social scientists need to engage with citizens in what can be seen as the 'democratic method'.in social research

An institution serves as the "nearest thing to a reliable model" in society, defined as a pattern of behaviour that is repeated over time, incorporating new knowledge, and replicated in diverse contexts to produce relatively consistent outcomes. The term 'dynamic theory' emphasises that social models are not static but represent collective knowledge and ongoing experiments about how to achieve objectives in society. Historical examples of the dynamic nature of institutions include the Van der Beurze family inn in 13th-century Bruges that was a meeting place for traders, eventually being institutionalised in 1409 as the Bourse at Bruges, on which the world's first stock exchanges are modelled. Similarly, in the late 1600s, Edward Lloyd's coffee house in London served as a meeting spot for merchants to insure their cargoes, giving rise to today's multi-billion insurance market. The McDonald's model echoes fried fish sellers in ancient Alexandria and thermopolia of the Roman empire, but is systematically tested and revised by its staff. Continuities of form and function can also be traced from ancient temples through synagogues, churches and mosques to the secular Sunday Assembly, showing the persistence of institutional forms alongside changing beliefs.

== Layers of analysis in dynamic social models ==
DST proposes analyzing institutions based on the different types of knowledge embedded into at least five layers within each real-time model. People work with these layers of knowledge to bring about the outcomes they want, which are often different for individuals and groups involved. Key layers include:

- Physical models / Infrastructure are the material structures, such as buildings, layout, and utensils, designed to achieve the institution's objectives. Physical models represent specialised knowledge, like the layout the McDonald brothers designed in chalk on a tennis court floor to simulate efficient food production flow. Infrastructure creates possibilities and constraints and can be changed, as seen when McDonald's designed drive-through outlets.
- Normative models consist of templates, formulae, methods, manuals, checklists, codes, and plans used to replicate the model (e.g., McDonald's franchisee process, staff handbooks).
- Power structures affect who can do what, when and how in an institution. Power dynamics determine how decisions are made, work is shared, resources allocated, and outcomes produced. They affect every aspect of a social model,
- Mental models are beliefs, abstract theories, values and other conceptual models used to work with, in, and on real-time social models. Alexander identifies at least ten types, including heuristic models (exploratory methods used for discovery and problem solving, such as projections, feasibility studies, scenario planning, strategic foresight, games, and simulations); generic models, distillations of lessons learned from successful real-time models, such as the "Scandinavian model of political economy," the Soviet model, and McDonald's model; mathematical models; Stories and Symbolssit at the pinnacle of the layers of analysis. Storytelling is crucial, conveying identity, values, belonging, and knowledge, and helping people replicate or change institutions.
- Relationships contain complex real-time knowledge that influence outcomes. People's emotions, motives, skills, and tacit understanding do not appear on organisational charts,

This outline highlights the need to observe how the many different kinds of knowledge embedded in a social model interact in reality in order to understand how best to influence it to produce better outcomes. Alexander writes "Because people have agency and are not automata, they incorporate new knowledge and technologies to meet changing circumstances or new purposes." Conceptual models represent only one dimension of knowledge about society and a snapshot in time.
