= Jerome Wakefield =

American social work professor and philosopher of psychiatry

- Born: Jerome Carl Wakefield
- Education: Queens College; University of California, Berkeley
- Known for: Work on psychiatric nosology and the philosophy of psychiatry
- Scientific career
- Fields: Social work
- Institutions: New York University
- Thesis: Do unconscious mental states exist? Freud, Searle, and the conceptual foundations of cognitive science (2001)
- Doctoral advisor: John Searle

Jerome C. Wakefield (born 1946) is a professor of social work in the New York University Silver School of Social Work. Much of his work is in the history and philosophy of psychiatry. He is noted for his "harmful dysfunction" analysis of mental illness, which he positions between the anti-psychiatry viewpoint of the social construction of mental illness and the conventional view in mainstream psychiatry that such illnesses can be objectively diagnosed based on a set of symptoms. A 1999 issue of the Journal of Abnormal Psychology that was dedicated to his views on the topic. In 2021, MIT Press published the book Defining Mental Disorder: Jerome Wakefield and His Critics, in which philosophers discussed Wakefield's "harmful dysfunction" analysis with detailed responses from Wakefield himself. He was elected a member of the American Academy of Social Work and Social Welfare in 2020. In 2022, he was ranked 14th among mental disorder scholars worldwide for lifetime productivity, quality, and impact, by ScholarsGPS
