= Social geometry =

Social geometry is a theoretical strategy of sociological explanation, invented by sociologist Donald Black, which uses a multi-dimensional model to explain variations in the behavior of social life. In Black's own use and application of the idea, social geometry is an instance of Pure Sociology.

== Variables ==
While social geometry might entail other elements as well (or instead), Black's own explanation of the model includes five variable aspects: horizontal/morphological (the extent and frequency of interaction among participants), vertical (the unequal distribution of resources), corporate (the degree of organization, or of integration of individuals into organizations), cultural (the amount and frequency of symbolic expressions), and normative (the extent of previously being the target of social control). Black refers to this multi-dimensional amalgam as "social space".

The five primary variables of social space:

- Stratification: The vertical aspect of social space, or the uneven distribution of material resources.
- Morphology: The horizontal aspect, including the degree of social integration and relational distance.
- Culture: The symbolic aspect, such as religion, language, or aesthetics.
- Organization: The corporate aspect, or the capacity for collective action.
- Social Control: The normative aspect, defining what is right or wrong and how people respond to deviant behavior.

== Precursors ==
Each element of Black's model is arguably an extension of part of something earlier in sociology. For example, vertical space is reminiscent of Marxist concerns, morphological of Émile Durkheim, and cultural perhaps of Pierre Bourdieu. However, several aspects of Black's approach differ from those previous theorists.

First, they emphasized a largely unidimensional model: Marx, for example, emphasized solely economic status (and derivatives of it, from base to superstructure) while Durkheim and Weber de-emphasized economic differentiation.

Second, by including multiple dimensions, Black's model allows for consideration of each variable while holding others constant. That is, the theoretical propositions hold under a condition of ceteris paribus, a probabilistic approach characteristic of science generally and contrary to the general cleavage of sociology between purported determinists and those who are anti-scientific. (Later versions of Black's work, such as "The Elementary Forms of Social Control", utilize multiple dimensions in a different way - as simultaneous dimensions, to generate a typology of social settings and conflict management patterns.)

Further, the inclusion of these variables within the same model allows for the possibility of both interaction effects between variables as well as correlation between them, with any one variable being used to explain any other. Black himself uses each of the dimensions to explain variation in normative behavior, but relational or cultural behavior might also be jointly accountable by the other dimensions.

Most significantly, Black's Social Geometry entails an epistemological departure from reliance on individualistic explanations, teleology, and even individuals as such. That is, it is an instance of pure sociology, and thus uses a different logic and language than any precursors from whose work Black's ideas may said to be extended or derived.

== Measurements ==
The model allows for several different kinds of measurement along these dimensions. First, location: For example, any case (individual, group, etc.) can be located in vertical space by their wealth. Second, distance: For example, any two cases (individuals, organizations, etc.) can be measured according to their relative wealth. Third, direction: Law, for example, is more likely in a downward direction (from a wealthier case to a less wealthy one) than upward (the reverse).

Black also cites examples – particularly in The Behavior of Law (1976) – which indicate movement through social space, such as a society becoming more stratified, or the status (and collective liability) of an ethnic group changing over time.

== Bibliography ==
- 1976. The Behavior of Law. {introduces the five aspects of Black's model of social space}
- 1998. The Social Structure of Right and Wrong. (Revised Edition, original edition 1993) {extends the model to address variable aspects of additional empirical matters}
