= White Collar: The American Middle Classes =

1951 book by C. Wright Mills

- First edition
- Author: C. Wright Mills
- Language: English
- Publisher: Oxford University Press
- Publication date: 1951
- Publication place: United States
- LC Class: HT690.U6 M5

White Collar: The American Middle Classes is a study of the American middle class by sociologist C. Wright Mills, first published in 1951. It describes the forming of a "new class": the white-collar workers. It is also a major study of social alienation in the modern world of advanced capitalism, where cities are dominated by "salesmanship mentality". The issues in this book were close to Mills' own background; his father was an insurance agent, and he himself, at that time, worked as a white-collar research worker in a bureaucratic organization at Paul Lazarsfeld's Bureau for Social Research at Columbia University. From this point of view, it is probably Mills' most private book. The familiarity with the studied object as a lived matter undoubtedly refers to Mills himself and his own experiences.

As Mills described it:

In a society of employees, dominated by the marketing mentality, it is inevitable that a personality market should arise. For in the great shift from manual skills to the art of "handling," selling, and servicing people, personal or even intimate traits of employees are drawn into the sphere of exchange, become commodities in the labor market. ...

Kindness and friendliness become aspects of personalized service or of public relations of big firms, rationalized to further the sale of something. With anonymous insincerity, the Successful Person thus makes an instrument of his own appearance and personality. ...

In the formulas of "personnel experts," men and women are to be shaped into the "well-rounded, acceptable, effective personality" [to close the deal or to make the sale] ...

The personality market, the most decisive effect and symptom of the great salesroom, underlies the all-pervasive distrust and self-alienation so characteristic of metropolitan people. Without common values and mutual trust, the cash nexus that links one man to another in transient contact has been made subtle in a dozen ways and made to bite deeper into all areas of life and relations. People are required by the salesman ethic and convention to pretend interest in others in order to manipulate them. ... Men are estranged from one another as each secretly tries to make an instrument of the other, and in time a full circle is made: one makes an instrument of himself, and is estranged from It also.
