= Jonathan H. Turner =

American sociologist (born 1942)

- Born: September 7, 1942 (age 84)

Academic background
- Education: Cornell University

Academic work
- Institutions: University of California, Riverside
- Main interests: Sociology

Jonathan H. Turner (born September 7, 1942), is a professor of sociology at University of California, Riverside.

== Biography ==
After receiving his PhD from Cornell University in 1968, since the academic year 1969–1970 he has been at UCR. He has been Faculty Research Lecturer at UCR, and in the profession, he has been president of the Pacific Sociological Association and California Sociological Association. He is also a Fellow of the American Association for the Advancement of Science. He has lectured widely all over the world, and he has been a visiting professor at Cambridge University, UK, Universitat Bremen, Germany, Universitat Bielefeld, Germany, Shandong University and Nankai University, People's Republic at China.

He is known as a general theorist of sociology, although he has a number of specialties: the sociology of emotions, ethnic relations, social institutions, social stratification, and bio-sociology.

Turner was awarded the 2008 Outstanding Recent Contribution Award by the American Sociological Association alongside co-author Jan E. Stets for their book Handbook of the Sociology of Emotions.

== Selected bibliography ==
Turner is an author of forty-one books, including textbooks, and well over two hundred articles.

- Turner, Jonathan H. (1974). The structure of sociological theory. Homewood, Illinois: Dorsey Press. ISBN 9780256015409.
- Turner, Jonathan H. (1979). Functionalism. The Benjamin/Cummings Company.
- Turner, Jonathan H. (1984). Societal stratification: a theoretical analysis. Columbia University Press.
- Turner, Jonathan H. (1985). Herbert Spencer: a renewed appreciation. Beverly Hills, California: SAGE Publications.
- Turner, Jonathan H. (1988). A theory of social interaction. Stanford University Press.
- Turner, Jonathan H. (1990). The impossible science: an institutional analysis of American sociology. Sage.
- Turner, Jonathan H. (1992). The social cage: human nature and the evolution of society. Stanford University Press.
- Turner, Jonathan H. (1992). Classical sociological theory: a positivist's perspective. Nelson-Hall.
- Turner, Jonathan H. (1994). Sociology: concepts and uses. New York: McGraw-Hill. ISBN 9780070655966.
- Turner, Jonathan H. (1997). The institutional order: economy, kinship, religion, polity, law, and education in evolutionary and comparative perspective. New York: Longman. ISBN 9780673981257.
- Turner, Jonathan H. (2002). Face to face toward a sociological theory of interpersonal behavior. Stanford, California: Stanford University Press. ISBN 9780585457802.
- Turner, Jonathan H. (2004). Theory and research on human emotions. Amsterdam Boston: JAI Press. ISBN 9780080474601.
- Turner, Jonathan H.; Stets, Jan E. (2006). Handbook of the sociology of emotions. New York: Springer. ISBN 9780387307152.
- Turner, Jonathan H. (2010). Theoretical principles of sociology: Volume 1 Macrodynamics. New York London: Springer. ISBN 9781441962270.
- Turner, Jonathan H (2010). Theoretical principles of sociology: Volume 2 Microdynamics. New York: Springer. ISBN 9781441962249.
- Turner, Jonathan H. (2014). Theoretical sociology: a concise introduction to twelve sociological theories. Los Angeles: SAGE. ISBN 9781452203478.
- Turner, Jonathan H., Alexandra Maryanski, Anders K. Petersen, and Armin Geertz (2018) The Emergence and Evolution of Religion: By Means of Natural Selection. New York and London: Routledge
- Turner, Jonathan H. and Richard Machalek (2018). The New Evolutionary Sociology: Recent and Revitalized Theoretical and Methodological Approaches. New York and London: Routledge.
- Turner, Jonathan H. (2021). On human nature: The biology and sociology of what made us human. Routledge.
