= Bibliography of sociology =

This bibliography of sociology is a list of works, organized by subdiscipline, on the subject of sociology. Some of the works are selected from general anthologies of sociology, while other works are selected because they are notable enough to be mentioned in a general history of sociology or one of its subdisciplines. (Note: See Michie, Jonathan, ed. 2001. Reader's Guide to the Social Sciences.)

Sociology studies society using various methods of empirical investigation to understand human social activity, from the micro level of individual agency and interaction to the macro level of systems and social structure.

== Foundations ==
- Comte, Auguste. 1865. Discours sur l'ensemble du positivisme [A General View of Positivism].
- Marx, Karl. 1867. Das Kapital. Kritik der politischen Ökonomie Capital [Capital: A Critique of Political Economy].
- Marx, Karl, and Engels, Friedrich. 1846. Die deutsche Ideologie [The German Ideology].
- Weber, Max. 1904. Die protestantische Ethik und der 'Geist' des Kapitalismus [The Protestant Ethic and the Spirit of Capitalism].
  - Putting forward a thesis that Puritan ethic and ideas had influenced the development of capitalism, Weber observes religious devotion to usually be accompanied by rejection of mundane affairs, including economic pursuit. Weber addresses the paradox of why this was not the case within Protestantism.
- Du Bois, W. E. B. 1899. The Philadelphia Negro: A Social Study.

=== Durkheim ===
- 1893. De La Division Du Travail Social [The Division of Labour in Society].
- 1897. Le Suicide: étude de sociologie [Suicide: A Study in Sociology].
  - A case study of suicide rates amongst Catholic, Protestant and Jewish populations, distinguished sociological analysis from psychology or philosophy. Also a major contribution to structural functionalism.
- 1912. Les formes élémentaires de la vie religieuse [The Elementary Forms of the Religious Life].
- 1919. Les Règles de la Méthode Sociologique [The Rules of Sociological Method].

== Culture ==
- Bourdieu, Pierre. 1979. La distinction: Critique sociale du jugement [Distinction: A Social Critique of the Judgment of Taste].
- Bourdieu, Pierre, and Jean-Claude Passeron.1970. La Reproduction. Éléments pour une théorie du système d'enseignement [Reproduction in Education, Society and Culture].
- Katz, Jack. 1988. Seductions of Crime: Moral and Sensual Attractions in Doing Evil.
- Schultz, Alfred. 1967. Der sinnhafte Aufbau der sozialen Welt [The Phenomenology of the Social world].

== Economy ==
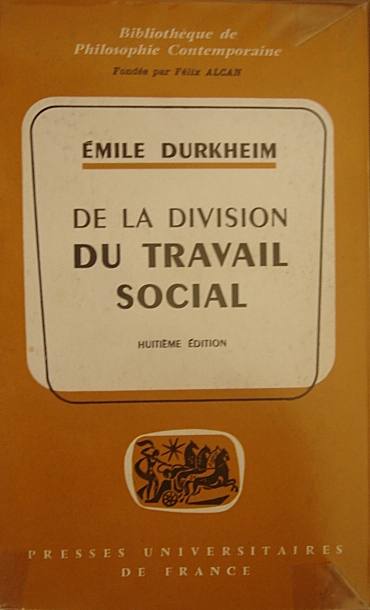
Cover of the French edition of the Division of Labor in Society by Emile Durkheim

Economic sociology attempts to explain economic phenomena. While overlapping with the general study of economics at times, economic sociology chiefly concentrates on the roles of social relations and institutions.

- Boltanski, Luc, and Ève Chiapello. 2005. The New Spirit of Capitalism.
- Boltanski, Luc, and Laurent Thévenot. 2006. On Justification. The Economies of Worth.
- de Tocqueville, Alexis. 1835/1840. De La Démocratie en Amérique [On Democracy in America] 1 & 2.
- — 1856. L'Ancien Régime et la Révolution [The Old Regime and the French Revolution].
- Durkheim, Emile. 1893. De La Division Du Travail Social [The Division of Labour in Society].
- Granovetter, Mark. 1985. "Economic Action and Social Structure: The Problem of Embeddedness." The American Journal of Sociology 91(3):481–510.
- Hirschman, Albert O. 1982. "Rival Interpretations of Market Society: Civilizing, Destructive, or Feeble?" Journal of Economic Literature 20(4):1463–84.
- Polanyi, Karl. 1944. The Great Transformation: The Political and Economic Origins of Our Time.
- Simmel, George. 1907. The Philosophy of Money.
- Smelser, Neil and Richard Swedberg, eds. 2005. The Handbook of Economic Sociology.
- Weber, Max. 1922. Wirtschaft und Gesellschaft [Economy and Society].
- White, Harrison C. 2002. Markets from Networks: Socioeconomic Models of Production.

=== Industry ===
Industrial sociology is the sociology of technological change, globalization, labor markets, work organization, managerial practices and employment relations.

- Bell, Daniel. 1973. The Coming of Post-Industrial Society: A Venture in Social Forecasting.
- Braverman, Harry. 1974. Labor and Monopoly Capital: The Degradation of Work in the Twentieth Century.
- Burawoy, Michael. 1979. Manufacturing Consent: Changes in the Labor Process Under Monopoly Capitalism.
- Dore, Ronald P. 1973. British factory, Japanese Factory.
- Goldthorpe, John, David Lockwood, Frank Bechhofer, and Jennifer Platt. 1968. The Affluent Worker: Industrial Attitudes and Behaviour.

== Spatial sociology ==
=== Environment ===
Environmental sociology studies the relationship between society and environment, particularly the social factors that cause environmental problems, the societal impacts of those problems, and efforts to solve the problems.

- Carson, Rachel. 1962. Silent Spring.
- Diamond, Jared. 2006. Collapse: How Societies Choose to Fail or Succeed.
- Hannigan, John A. 1995. Environmental Sociology: A Social Constructionist Perspective.
  - Argues that a society's willingness to recognize and solve environmental problems depends more upon the way these claims are presented by a limited number of interest groups than upon the severity of the threat they pose.
- Michelson, William. 2002. Handbook of Environmental Sociology.
  - Provides an overview of the field of environmental sociology and its various research emphases.
- Schnaiberg, Allan, and Kenneth Alan Gould. 2000. Environment and Society: The Enduring Conflict. Caldwell.
  - Demonstrates how our global economy requires increasing levels of economic expansion, which in turn requires increasing withdrawals for the natural environment.

=== Demography ===
Demography is the statistical study of human population. It encompasses the study of the size, structure and distribution of these populations, and spatial and/or temporal changes in them in response to birth, migration, aging and death.

- Malthus, Thomas. 1798. An Essay on the Principle of Population.
- Myrdal, Alva, and Gunnar Myrdal. 1934. Crisis in the Population Question.

=== Urban ===
Urban sociology refers the study of social life and human interaction in metropolitan areas.

- Castells, Manuel 1972. The Urban Question: A Marxist Approach.
- Delany, Samuel R. 1999. Times Square Red, Times Square Blue.
- Gottdiener, Mark, and Ray Hutchison. 2000. The New Urban Sociology.
- Hutter, Mark. 2007. Experiencing Cities: A Global Approach.
- Jacobs, Jane. 1961. The Death and Life of Great American Cities.
  - "[This book] became perhaps the most influential single work in the history of town planning, and simultaneously helped to kill off the modern movement in architecture."
- Molotch, Harvey, and John R. Logan. 1987. Urban Fortunes: The Political economy of Place.
  - Turned mainstream sociological opinion against the Chicago school of Human Ecology by foregrounding the influence of institutions and political settings in the growth of cities.
- Park, Robert E., and Ernest W. Burgess. 1925. The City.
  - Foundational text in American sociology, Chicago school, Urban sociology, and Human ecology.
- Simmel, Georg. 1903. The Metropolis and Mental Life.

== Gender and Intersectionality ==
- Bem, Sandra Lipsitz. 1994. Lenses of Gender: Transforming the Debate on Sexual Inequality.
- Chodorow, Nancy. 1978. The Reproduction of Mothering.
- Collins, Patricia Hill. 2005. Black Sexual Politics: African Americans, Gender, and the New Racism.
- — 2006. From Black Power to Hip Hop: Racism, Nationalism, and Feminism.
- Connell, Raewyn W. 1987. Gender and Power: Society, the Person, and Sexual Politics.
- — 2002. Gender: Short Introductions.
- Harding, Sandra. 1991. Whose Science? Whose Knowledge?: Thinking from Women's Lives.

== Knowledge ==
Sociology of knowledge refers to the study of the relationship between human thought and the social context within which it arises, as well as of the effects prevailing ideas have on societies.

- Berger, Peter L., and Thomas Luckmann. 1966. The Social Construction of Reality: A Treatise in the Sociology of Knowledge.
- Bloor, David. 1976. Knowledge and social imagery.
  - Gave rise to the field known as Science and Technology Studies.
- Fleck, Ludwik. 1935. Genesis and development of a scientific fact.
- Latour, Bruno, and Steve Woolgar. 1979. Laboratory Life: The Construction of Scientific Facts.
  - Ethnography of microbiologists working at the Salk Institute. Explains the elevation of observations to the level of fact through a system of credibility. Started the ethnographic laboratory studies movement in the sociology of knowledge.
- Mannheim, Karl. 1936. Ideologie und Utopie [Ideology and Utopia].

== Politics ==
Traditionally, political sociology has been concerned with the ways in which social trends, dynamics, and structures of domination affect formal political processes, as well as exploring how various social forces work together to change political policies. Now, it is also concerned with the formation of identity through social interaction, the politics of knowledge, and other aspects of social relations.

- Mills, C. Wright. 1958. The Power Elite.
- Domhoff, G. William. 1967. Who Rules America?.
- Skocpol, Theda. 1979. States and Social Revolutions: A Comparative Analysis of France, Russia, and China.
- Piven, Frances Fox, and Richard Cloward. 1988. Why Americans Don't Vote.
- — 2000. Why Americans Still Don't Vote: And Why Politicians Want It That Way.

== Race and ethnicity ==
The sociology of race and ethnic relations refers to the study of social, political, and economic relations between races and ethnicities at all levels of society, encompassing subjects such as racism and residential segregation.

- Du Bois, W. E. B. 1899. The Philadelphia Negro: A Social Study.
- — 1903. The Souls of Black Folk.
- Myrdal, Gunnar. 1944. An American Dilemma: The Negro Problem and Modern Democracy.

== Religion ==
The sociology of religion concerns the role of religion in society, including practices, historical backgrounds, developments, and universal themes. There is particular emphasis on the recurring role of religion in all societies and throughout recorded history.

- Durkheim, Émile. 1912. Les formes élémentaires de la vie religieuse [The Elementary Forms of the Religious Life].
- Berger, Peter L. 1967. The Sacred Canopy: Elements of a Sociological Theory of Religion.
- — 1970. A Rumor of Angels: Modern Society and the Rediscovery of the Supernatural.

== Theory ==
Sociological theories are complex theoretical and methodological frameworks used to analyze and explain objects of social study, which ultimately facilitate the organization of sociological knowledge.

=== Conflict Theory ===
Conflict theories, originally influenced by Marxist thought, are perspectives that see societies as defined through conflicts that are produced by inequality. Conflict theory emphasizes social conflict, as well as economic inequality, social inequality, oppression, and crime.

- Marx, Karl, and Friedrich Engels. 1848. The Communist Manifesto.
- Marx, Karl. 1859. A Contribution to the Critique of Political Economy.
- Veblen, Thorstein. 1899. The Theory of the Leisure Class.
- — 1904. The Theory of Business Enterprise.
- Mills, C. Wright. 1951. White Collar: The American Middle Classes.
- — 1958. The Power Elite.
- — 1959. The Sociological Imagination.
- Sharp, Gene. 1985. Making Europe Unconquerable.

=== Rational Choice Theory ===
Rational choice theory models social behavior as the interaction of utility-maximizing individuals.

- Coleman, James Samuel. 1990. Foundations of Social Theory.
- Olson, Mancur. 1971. The Logic of Collective Action: Public Goods and the Theory of Groups.

=== Social Exchange Theory ===
Social Exchange Theory models social interaction as a series of exchanges between actors who give one another rewards and penalties, which impacts and guides future behavior. George Homans' version of exchange theory specifically argues that behaviorist stimulus-response principles can explain the emergence of complex social structures.

- Blau, Peter. 1964. Exchange & Power in Social Life.
- Emerson, Richard. 1962. "Power-Dependence Theory." American Sociological Review 27(1):31-41.
- Homans, George C. 1958. "Social Behavior as Exchange." American Journal of Sociology 63(6):597-606.
- Homans, George C. 1961. Social Behavior: Its Elementary Forms.

=== Social Network Analysis ===
Making use of network theory, social network analysis is structural approach to sociology that views norms and behaviors as embedded in chains of social relations.

- Scott, John. 1991. Social Network Analysis: A Handbook.
  - Provides a broad introduction to the subject.
- Wasserman, Stanley, and Katherine Faust. 1994. Social Network Analysis: Methods and Applications.
  - Presents thorough methodological coverage of the approach.
- Wellman, Barry, and S.D. Berkowitz, eds. 1988. Social Structures: A Network Approach.
  - Provides a readable theoretical overview of the subject using many case studies.

=== Sociocybernetics ===
Sociocybernetics is the application of systems theory and cybernetics to sociology.

- Bánáthy, Béla H. 1996. Designing Social Systems in a Changing World.
- Bateson, Gregory. 1972. Steps to an Ecology of Mind: Collected Essays in Anthropology, Psychiatry, Evolution, and Epistemology.
- — (1979). Mind and Nature: A Necessary Unity.
- Bateson, Gregory, and M. C. Bateson. 1988. Angels Fear: Towards an Epistemology of the Sacred.
- László, Ervin. 1984. The Systems View of the World: The Natural Philosophy of the New Developments in the Sciences.
- von Bertalanffy, Ludwig. 1968. General System Theory: Foundations, Development, Applications.
- Wiener, Norbert. 1948. Cybernetics: Or Control and Communication in the Animal and the Machine.

=== Structural Functionalism ===
Structural functionalism is a broad perspective that interprets society as a structure with interrelated parts.

- Durkheim, Emile. 1897. Le Suicide: étude de sociologie [Suicide: A Study in Sociology].
- Parsons, Talcott. 1937. The Structure of Social Action.
- — 1951. The Social System.
- Parsons, Talcott, and Edward A. Shils. 1951. Toward a General Theory of Action: Theoretical Foundations for the Social Sciences.

=== Symbolic Interactionism ===
Symbolic interactionism argues that human behavior is guided by the meanings people construct together in social interaction.

- Blumer, Herbert. 1969. Symbolic Interactionism: Perspective and Method.
- Cooley, Charles Horton. 1902. Human Nature and the Social Order.
- Mead, George Herbert. 1934. Mind, Self, and Society.
- Stryker, Sheldon. 1980. Symbolic Interactionism: A Social Structural Version.

== See also ==
- List of scientific journals in sociology
- Sociology
- Engaged theory
- History of the social sciences
- Outline of sociology
