= Gemeinschaft and Gesellschaft =

Types of social ties by Ferdinand Tönnies

Gemeinschaft (German pronunciation: [ɡəˈmaɪnʃaft]) and Gesellschaft ([ɡəˈzɛlʃaft]), generally translated as "community and society", are categories which were used by the German sociologist Ferdinand Tönnies in order to categorize social relationships into two types. The Gesellschaft is associated with modern society and rational self-interest, which weakens the traditional bonds of family and local community that typify the Gemeinschaft. Max Weber, a founding figure in sociology, also wrote extensively about the relationship between Gemeinschaft and Gesellschaft. Weber wrote in direct response to Tönnies.

== Gemeinschaft–Gesellschaft dichotomy ==
According to the dichotomy, social ties can be categorized, on one hand, as belonging to personal social interactions, and the roles, values, and beliefs based on such interactions (Gemeinschaft, German, commonly translated as "community"), or on the other hand as belonging to indirect interactions, impersonal roles, formal values, and beliefs based on such interactions (Gesellschaft, German, commonly translated as society as in association, corporation, including company, modern state and academia). The Gemeinschaft–Gesellschaft dichotomy was proposed by Tönnies as a purely conceptual tool rather than as an ideal type in the way it was used by Max Weber to accentuate the key elements of a historical social change.

Tönnies was a Thomas Hobbes scholar—he edited the standard modern editions of Hobbes's The Elements of Law and Leviathan. It was his study of Hobbes that encouraged Tönnies to devote himself wholly to the philosophy of history and the philosophy of law. And it has been argued that he derived both categories from Hobbes's concepts of "concord" and "union".

The second edition, published in 1912, of the work in which Tönnies further promoted the concepts turned out to be an unexpected but lasting success after the first edition was published in 1887 with the subtitle "Treatise on Communism and Socialism as Empirical Patterns of Culture". Seven more German editions followed, the last in 1935, and it became part of the general stock of ideas with which pre-1933 German intellectuals were quite familiar. The book sparked a revival of corporatist thinking, including the rise of neo-medievalism, the rise of support for guild socialism, and caused major changes in the field of sociology. The distinction between Gemeinschaft and Gesellschaft was a large part of the discussion and debate about what constitutes community, among heavily influenced social theorists in the late nineteenth and early twentieth century such as Georg Simmel, Émile Durkheim and Max Weber.

The concepts Gemeinschaft and Gesellschaft were also used by Max Weber in Economy and Society, which was first published in 1921. Weber wrote in direct response to Tönnies, and argued that Gemeinschaft is rooted in a "subjective feeling" that may be "affectual or traditional". Gesellschaft-based relationships, according to Weber, are rooted in "rational agreement by mutual consent", the best example of which is a commercial contract. To emphasize the fluidity and amorphousness of the relationship between Gemeinschaft and Gesellschaft, Weber modified the terms in German to Vergemeinschaftung, and Vergesellschaftung, which are the gerund forms of the German words. Weber's distinction between Gemeinschaft and Gesellschaft is highlighted in the essay "Classes, Stände, Parties", which is the basis for Weber's three-component theory of stratification.

Having put forward his conception of the Gemeinschaft–Gesellschaft dichotomy, Tönnies was drawn into a sharp polemic with Émile Durkheim. In a review of Tönnies's book in 1889, Durkheim interpreted Gemeinschaft as having mechanical solidarity, and Gesellschaft as having organic solidarity, reproaching Tönnies for considering the second type of social organisation artificial and not expanding on the transition from the one type to the other. Durkheim stated that Tönnies's approach to understanding Gesellschaft was "completely ideological" but that "one cannot fail to recognize in this book truly forceful thinking and an uncommon power of organization." Tönnies did not agree with Durkheim's interpretation of his views, and in turn, when reviewing Durkheim's The Division of Labour in Society (1893), wrote that Durkheim failed to deal critically enough with the division of labor and that Durkheim's whole sociology was a modification of Spencer's (who had his own dichotomy between what he called the "militant society" and the "industrial society").

In World War I propaganda self-sacrificing (virtuous) women were portrayed as the heart of the Gemeinschaft by providing the model for the dutiful wartime home maker supporting the war effort by sending their men (husbands and sons) to serve in the war, and maintaining the home in their absence. (In the wartime propaganda this "virtuous woman" was an ideal contrasted to less desirable archetypes that were presented as immoral or unethical women).

== Globalization ==
Eric Hobsbawm argued that, as globalization turns the entire planet into an increasingly remote kind of Gesellschaft, so too collective identity politics seeks for a fictitious remaking of the qualities of Gemeinschaft by artificially reforging group bonds and identities.

Fredric Jameson highlights the ambivalent envy felt by those constructed by Gesellschaft for remaining enclaves of Gemeinschaft, even as they inevitably corrode their existence.

== Latest edition ==
- Gemeinschaft und Gesellschaft. 1880-1935., hrsg. v. Bettina Clausen und Dieter Haselbach, De Gruyter, Berlin/Boston 2019 (Ferdinand Tönnies Gesamtausgabe, Band 2).

== See also ==
- Antipositivism – Theoretical stance in social science
- Collaborative innovation network – Practice that uses internet platforms to promote communication within virtual teams
- Community – Social unit which shares commonality
- Mechanical and organic solidarity – Types of social solidarity formulated by Durkheim
- Normal type
- Reflexivity (social theory) – Circular relationships between cause and effect
- Social action – Act which takes other individuals into account
- Structure and agency – Debate in social sciences
- Verstehen – Social science conception of understanding and relation
- Volksgemeinschaft – German expression referring to the unity of a people, folk, nation or race
