= Anomie =

Sociological term for "normlessness"

In sociology, anomie or anomy (/ˈænəmi/) is a social condition defined by an uprooting or breakdown of any moral values, standards, or guidance for individuals to follow. Anomie is believed to possibly evolve from conflict of belief systems and causes breakdown of social bonds between an individual and the community (both economic and primary socialization).

The term, commonly understood to mean normlessness, is believed to have been popularized by French sociologist Émile Durkheim in his influential book Suicide (1897). Émile Durkheim suggested that Protestants exhibited a greater degree of anomie than Catholics. However, Durkheim first introduced the concept of anomie in his 1893 work The Division of Labour in Society. Durkheim never used the term normlessness; rather, he described anomie as "derangement", and "an insatiable will." Durkheim used the phrase "the malady of the infinite" because desire without limit can never be fulfilled; it only becomes more intense.

For Durkheim, anomie arises more generally from a mismatch between personal or group standards and wider social standards, or from the lack of a social ethic, which produces moral deregulation and an absence of legitimate aspirations, i.e.:

[A]nomie is a mismatch, not simply the absence of norms. Thus, a society with too much rigidity and little individual discretion could also produce a kind of anomie ...

== History ==
In 1893, Durkheim introduced the concept of anomie to describe the mismatch between collective guild labour and evolving societal needs when the guild was homogeneous in its constituency. He equated homogeneous (redundant) skills to mechanical solidarity whose inertia hindered adaptation. He contrasted this with the self-regulating behaviour of a division of labour based on differences in constituency, which he equated with organic solidarity, whose lack of inertia made it sensitive to needed changes.

Durkheim observed that the conflict between the evolved organic division of labour and the homogeneous mechanical type was such that one could not exist in the presence of the other. When solidarity is organic, anomie is impossible, as sensitivity to mutual needs promotes evolution in the division of labour:

Producers, being near consumers, can easily reckon the extent of the needs to be satisfied. Equilibrium is established without any trouble and production regulates itself.

Durkheim contrasted the condition of anomie as being the result of a malfunction of organic solidarity after the transition to mechanical solidarity:

But on the contrary, if some opaque environment is interposed ... relations [are] rare, are not repeated enough ... are too intermittent. Contact is no longer sufficient. The producer can no longer embrace the market at a glance, nor even in thought. He can no longer see its limits, since it is, so to speak limitless. Accordingly, production becomes unbridled and unregulated.

Durkheim's use of anomie referred to the phenomenon of industrialization—mass-regimentation that could not adapt due to its own inertia. More specifically, its resistance to change causes disruptive cycles in collective behavior (e.g., economics) because it requires a prolonged buildup of sufficient force or momentum to overcome inertia.

Later in 1897, in his studies of suicide, Durkheim associated anomie with the influence of a lack of norms or norms that were too rigid. However, such normlessness or norm-rigidity was a symptom of anomie, caused by the lack of differential adaptation that would enable norms to evolve naturally through self-regulation, either to develop norms where none existed or to change norms that had become rigid and obsolete. Durkheim found that Protestant communities have noticeably higher suicide rates than Catholic ones, and justified it with individualism and lack of social cohesion prevalent amongst Protestants, creating a poorly integrated society and making Protestants less likely to develop close communal ties that would be crucial in times of hardship. Conversely, he states that the Catholic faith binds individuals together and builds strong social ties, decreasing the risk of suicide and alienation. In this, Durkheim argued that religion is much more important than culture with regard to anomic suicide. This allowed Durkheim to successfully tie social cohesion to suicide rates:

If the individual isolates himself, it is because the ties uniting him with others are slackened or broken, because society is not sufficiently integrated at the points where he is in contact with it. These gaps between one and another individual consciousness, estranging them from each other, are authentic results of the weakening of the social fabric.

In 1938, Robert K. Merton linked anomie with deviance, arguing that the discontinuity between culture and structure has the dysfunctional consequence of leading to deviance within society. He described 5 types of deviance in terms of the acceptance or rejection of social goals and the institutionalized means of achieving them.

== Etymology ==
The term anomie—"a reborrowing with French spelling of anomy"—comes from Ancient Greek: anomía (ἀνομία, 'lawlessness'), namely the privative alpha prefix (a-, 'without'), and nomos (νόμος, 'law'). The Greeks distinguished between nomos, and arché (ἀρχή, 'starting rule, axiom, principle'). For example, a monarch is a single ruler but may still be subject to, and not exempt from, the prevailing laws, i.e., nomos. In the original city state democracy, majority rule was an aspect of arché because it was a rule-based, customary system that may or may not make laws, i.e., nomos. Thus, the original meaning of anomie defined anything or anyone against or outside the law, or a condition where the current laws were not applied, resulting in a state of illegitimacy or lawlessness.

The contemporary English understanding of the word anomie can accept greater flexibility in the word "norm", and some have used the idea of normlessness to reflect a similar situation to the idea of anarchy. However, as used by Émile Durkheim and later theorists, anomie is a reaction against or a retreat from the regulatory social controls of society, and is a completely separate concept from anarchy, which consists of the absence of the roles of rulers and the ruled.

== Social disorder ==
Nineteenth-century French sociologist Émile Durkheim borrowed the term anomie from French philosopher Jean-Marie Guyau. Durkheim used it in his influential book Suicide (1897) in order to outline the social (and not individual) causes of suicide, characterized by a rapid change of the standards or values of societies (often erroneously referred to as normlessness), and an associated feeling of alienation and purposelessness. He believed that anomie is common when the surrounding society has undergone significant changes in its economic fortunes, whether for better or worse, and, more generally, when there is a significant discrepancy between the ideological theories and values commonly professed and what is actually achievable in everyday life. This was contrary to previous theories on suicide, which generally maintained that suicide was precipitated by negative events in a person's life and their subsequent depression.

In Durkheim's view, traditional religions often provided the basis for the shared values that the anomic individual lacks. Furthermore, he argued that the division of labor prevalent in economic life since the Industrial Revolution led individuals to pursue egoistic ends rather than to seek the good of a larger community. Robert King Merton also adopted the concept of anomie to develop strain theory, defining it as the discrepancy between socially accepted goals and the legitimate means of attaining them. In other words, an individual suffering from anomie would strive to attain the common goals of a specific society, yet would be unable to achieve them legitimately because of the structural limitations of society. As a result, the individual would exhibit deviant behavior. Friedrich Hayek notably uses the word anomie with this meaning.

According to one academic survey, psychometric testing confirmed a link between anomie and academic dishonesty among university students, suggesting that universities need to foster codes of ethics among students to curb it. In another study, anomie was seen as a "push factor" in tourism.

As an older variant, the 1913 Webster's Dictionary reports the word anomie as meaning "disregard or violation of the law." However, anomie as a social disorder is not to be confused with anarchy: proponents of anarchism claim that anarchy does not necessarily lead to anomie and that hierarchical command actually increases lawlessness. Some anarcho-primitivists argue that complex societies, particularly industrial and post-industrial societies, directly cause conditions such as anomie by depriving the individual of self-determination and of a relatively small reference group to relate to, such as a band, clan, or tribe.

In 2003, José Soltero and Romeo Saravia analyzed the concept of anomie with regard to Protestantism and Catholicism in El Salvador. Massive displacement of population in the 1970s, economic and political crises, as well as cycles of violence, are credited with radically changing the religious composition of the country, rendering it one of the most Protestant countries in Latin America. According to Soltero and Saravia, the rise of Protestantism is conversationally claimed to be caused by a Catholic failure to "address the spiritual needs of the poor" and the Protestant "deeper quest for salvation, liberation, and eternal life". However, their research does not support these claims, and showed that Protestantism is not more popular amongst the poor. Their findings do confirm the assumptions of anomie, with Catholic communities of El Salvador enjoying high social cohesion, while the Protestant communities have been associated with poorer social integration, internal migration and tend to be places deeply affected by the Salvadoran Civil War. Additionally, Soltero and Saravia found that Salvadoran Catholicism is tied to social activism, liberation theology and the political left, as opposed to the "right wing political orientation, or at least a passive, personally inward orientation, expressed by some Protestant churches". They conclude that their research contradicts the theory that Protestantism responds to the spiritual needs of the poor more adequately than Catholicism, while also disproving the claim that Protestantism appeals more to women:

These outcomes contradict the theory that Protestantism responds to the spiritual needs of the poor (Shaull and Cesar 2001; Smith, 1998; Vazquez 2000) more adequately than Catholicism in El Salvador's less resourceful suburban areas. In fact, the results indicate that individuals of different resource levels, among the sample studied, have no real preference between Protestantism and Catholicism for the most part. Hence, believers' spiritual needs may or may not take them to another church, independently of their social class background, as demonstrated by the existence of Protestant churches with middle and upper middle class constituencies (Cleary 1992; Garrard-Burnett 1998). In a study of Guatemalan highland Maya, Smith (1998) reports no differences in lifestyle between poor Protestants and poor Catholic. [...] There is no difference between men and women in terms of their likelihood of joining a non-Catholic church (Protestant or otherwise) or being non-religious, rather than being Catholic. Indeed, Peterson (2001:30) argues that in El Salvador, "progressive Catholic communities offer many women support, both material and moral, for their efforts to cope with domestic problems such as a husband's departure or alcoholism."

The study by Soltero and Saravia has also found a link between Protestantism and no access to healthcare:

When people have access to medical care in their community, joining Protestant churches is less likely, but if access to medical care exists only outside their community the probability of joining a Protestant church increases. [...] Indeed, faith healing seems to be an important aspect of Protestant churches' attraction to believers (Chesnut 1997; Vizquez 1998), as well as the provision of a more traditional kind of medical assistance to the public (Smith 1998).

== Synnomie ==
Freda Adler coined synnomie as the opposite of anomie. Using Émile Durkheim's concept of social solidarity and collective consciousness, Adler defined synnomie as "a congruence of norms to the point of harmonious accommodation".

Adler described societies in a synnomie state as "characterized by norm conformity, cohesion, intact social controls and norm integration". Social institutions such as the family, religion, and communities largely serve as sources of norms and social control to maintain a synnomic society.

== In culture ==
In Albert Camus's existentialist novel The Stranger, Meursault—the bored, alienated protagonist—struggles to construct an individual system of values as he responds to the disappearance of the old. He exists largely in a state of anomie, as seen from the apathy evinced in the opening lines: "Aujourd'hui, maman est morte. Ou peut-être hier, je ne sais pas" ("Today mum died. Or maybe yesterday, I don't know").

Fyodor Dostoyevsky expresses a similar concern about anomie in his novel The Brothers Karamazov. The Grand Inquisitor remarks that in the absence of God and immortal life, everything would be lawful. In other words, that any act becomes thinkable, that there is no moral compass, which leads to apathy and detachment.

== See also ==
- Acedia
- Atavism
- Authoritarianism
- Groupthink
- Learned helplessness
- Mass society
- Misanthropy
- Nihilism
- Political apathy
- Psychological resilience
- Relativism
- Social alienation
- Strain theory (sociology)
- Suicide (Durkheim book)
- Societal collapse
- Social disorganization theory
- Theory of deviance
