= The Elementary Forms of the Religious Life =

1912 book by Emile Durkheim

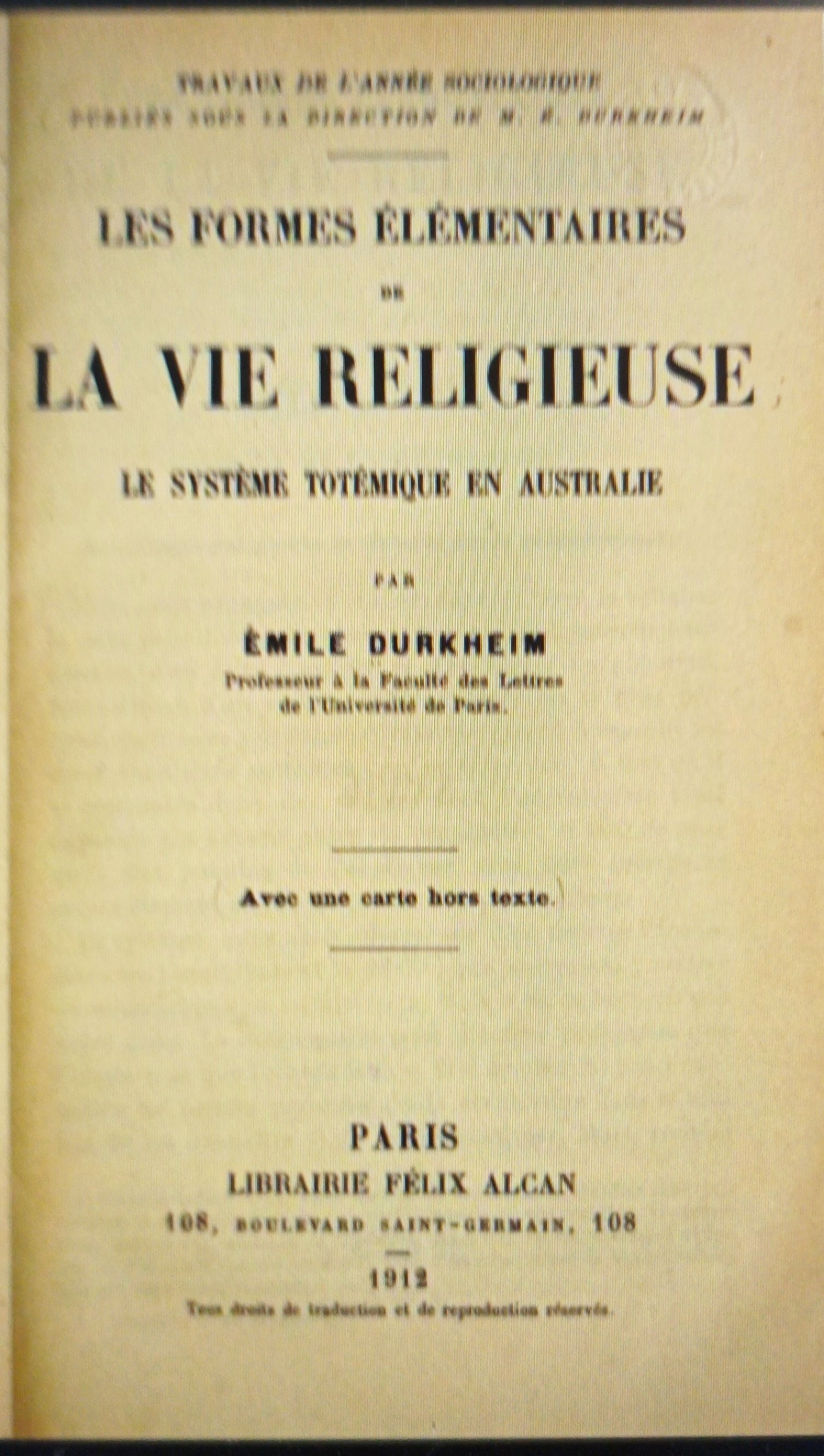
- Author: Émile Durkheim
- Original title: Les formes élémentaires de la vie religieuse
- Translator: Joseph Swain
- Language: French
- Genre: Non-fiction
- Publication date: 1912

The Elementary Forms of Religious Life (French: Les formes élémentaires de la vie religieuse), published by the French sociologist Émile Durkheim in 1912, is a book that analyzes religion as a social phenomenon.

== Overview ==
Durkheim attributes the development of religion to the emotional security attained through communal living. His study of totemic societies in Australia led to a conclusion that the animal or plant that each clan worshipped as a sacred power was in fact that society itself. Halfway through the text, Durkheim asks, "So if [the totem animal] is at once the symbol of the god and of the society, is that not because the god and the society are only one?"

According to Durkheim, early humans associated such feelings not only with one another, but as well with objects in their environment. This, Durkheim believed, led to the ascription of human sentiments and superhuman powers to these objects, in turn leading to totemism. The essence of religion, Durkheim finds, is the concept of the sacred, the only phenomenon which unites all religions. "A religion," writes Durkheim, "is a unified system of beliefs and practices relative to sacred things, that is to say, things set apart and forbidden—beliefs and practices which unite into a single moral community called a Church, all those who adhere to them." Durkheim concludes:

In summing up, then, we must say that society is not at all the illogical or a-logical, incoherent and fantastic being which it has too often been considered. Quite on the contrary, the collective consciousness is the highest form of the psychic life, since it is the consciousness of the consciousnesses. Being placed outside of and above individual and local contingencies, it sees things only in their permanent and essential aspects, which it crystallizes into communicable ideas. At the same time that it sees from above, it sees farther; at every moment of time, it embraces all known reality; that is why it alone can furnish the mind with the moulds which are applicable to the totality of things and which make it possible to think of them. It does not create these moulds artificially; it finds them within itself; it does nothing but become conscious of them.(445)

Durkheim means that the symbolization of the collective consciousness is done through the totemic animal. It is through this 'flag' that Australian Aboriginals become conscious of themselves within a system of knowledge given by the group itself.

Durkheim examined religion using such examples as Pueblo Indian rain dances, the religions of aboriginal communities in Australia, and alcoholic hallucinations.

== See also ==
- The Division of Labour in Society (1893)
- The Rules of Sociological Method (1895)
- Suicide (1897)
