= Collective consciousness =

Shared beliefs and ideas in society

Collective consciousness, collective conscience, or collective conscious (French: conscience collective) is the set of shared beliefs, ideas, and moral attitudes which operate as a unifying force within society. In general, it does not refer to the specifically moral conscience, but to a shared understanding of social norms.

The modern concept of what can be considered collective consciousness includes solidarity attitudes, memes, extreme behaviors like group-think and herd behavior, and collectively shared experiences during collective rituals, dance parties, and the discarnate entities which can be experienced from psychedelic use.

Rather than existing as separate individuals, people come together as dynamic groups to share resources and knowledge. It has also developed as a way of describing how an entire community comes together to share similar values. This has also been termed "hive mind", "group mind", "mass mind", and "social mind".

== Historical use of collective consciousness ==
The term was introduced by the French sociologist Émile Durkheim in his The Division of Labour in Society in 1893. The French word conscience generally means "conscience", "consciousness", "awareness", or "perception". Given the multiplicity of definitions, translators of Durkheim disagree on which is most appropriate, or whether the translation should depend on the context. Some prefer to treat the word 'conscience' as an untranslatable foreign word or technical term, without its normal English meaning.

Scipio Sighele published ‘La Foule Criminele’ one year before Durkheim, in which he describes emergent characteristics of crowds that don’t appear in the individuals that form the crowd. He doesn’t call this collective consciousness, but ‘âme de la foule’ (soul of the crowd). This term returns in Sigmund Freud’s book about mass psychology and essentially overlaps with Durkheim's concept of collective consciousness.

== Theories of collective consciousness ==
=== Durkheim ===
The totality of beliefs and sentiments common to the average members of a society forms a determinate system with a life of its own. It can be termed the collective or common consciousness.

— Émile Durkheim

In Suicide, Durkheim developed the concept of anomie to refer to the social rather than individual causes of suicide. This relates to the concept of collective consciousness, as if there is a lack of integration or solidarity in society then suicide rates will be higher.

=== Gramsci ===
Antonio Gramsci states, “A collective consciousness, which is to say a living organism, is formed only after the unification of the multiplicity through friction on the part of the individuals; nor can one say that ‘silence’ is not a multiplicity.”

According to Michelle Filippini, “The nature and workings of collective organisms – not only parties, but also trade unions, associations and intermediate bodies in general – represent a specific sphere of reflection in the Prison Notebooks, particularly in regard to the new relationship between State and society that in Gramsci's view emerged during the age of mass politics.”

=== Zukerfield ===
Zukerfield states that “The different disciplines that have studied knowledge share an understanding of it as a product of human subjects – individual, collective, etc.”

Collective consciousness can provide an understanding of the relationship between self and society. As Zukerfeld states, “Even though it impels us, as a first customary gesture, to analyse the subjective (such as individual consciousness) or intersubjective bearers (such as the values of a given society), in other words those which Marxism and sociology examine, now we can approach them in an entirely different light.”

== Collective consciousness in society ==
Society is made up of various collective groups, such as the family, community, organizations, regions, nations which as Burns and Egdahl state "can be considered to possess agential capabilities: to think, judge, decide, act, reform; to conceptualize self and others as well as self's actions and interactions; and to reflect.".

According to a theory, the character of collective consciousness depends on the type of mnemonic encoding used within a group (Tsoukalas, 2007). The specific type of encoding used has a predictable influence on the group's behavior and collective ideology. Informal groups, that meet infrequently and spontaneously, have a tendency to represent significant aspects of their community as episodic memories. This usually leads to strong social cohesion and solidarity, an indulgent atmosphere, an exclusive ethos and a restriction of social networks. Formal groups, that have scheduled and anonymous meetings, tend to represent significant aspects of their community as semantic memories which usually leads to weak social cohesion and solidarity, a more moderate atmosphere, an inclusive ethos and an expansion of social networks.

=== Literary and oral tradition ===
In a case study of a Serbian folk story, Wolfgang Ernst examines collective consciousness in terms of forms of media, specifically collective oral and literary traditions. "Current discourse analysis drifts away from the 'culturalist turn' of the last two or three decades and its concern with individual and collective memory as an extended target of historical research". There is still a collective consciousness present in terms of the shared appreciation of folk stories and oral traditions, and folk stories enable the subject and the audiences to come together around a common experience and a shared heritage.

== See also ==
- Abilene paradox
- Agenda 21
- Anonymous (group)
- Antonio Gramsci
- Borg Collective
- Cognitive model § Mother-fetus cognitive model
- Collective effervescence
- Collective identity
- Collective intelligence
- Collective memory
- Collective unconscious
- Communal reinforcement
- Crowd psychology
- Deep social mind
- Práńa Dharma
- Egregor
- Global brain
- Global goals
- Group behaviour
- Group mind
- Groupthink
- Higher consciousness
- Human spirit
- Identity politics
- Infodemic
- Materialism
- Noosphere
- Paradigm
- Paradigm shift
- Peer pressure
- Presence (telepresence)
- Reality tunnel
- Schema (psychology)
- Shared intentionality
- Social justice
- Social representation
- Superorganism
- Unanimism
- United Nations
- Völkerpsychologie
- Zeitgeist
