= Solidarity =

Unity of feeling or action on a common interest

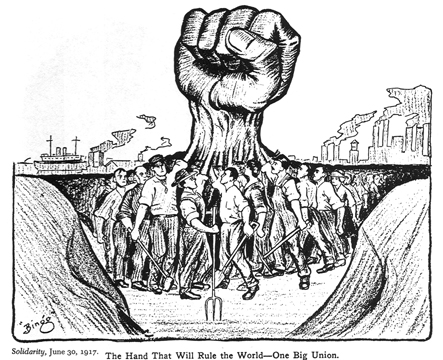
A raised fist symbolizing solidarity of the worker movement

Solidarity or solidarism is the provision of mutual moral and material support among the members of a group in times of need.

== History ==
=== Socialisation of the concept ===
The terms solidaire and solidairement had already appeared in French legal language in the 16th century. They are related to the Roman legal concept in solidum, which was derived from the Latin word solidus, meaning "on behalf of the whole". In the Napoleonic code, solidarity meant the joint liability of debtors towards a common creditor and was not a primary legal principle.

Conservatism, following the French Revolution, introduced the concept of "solidarity", which was detached from the legal system, as a reaction against rapid social change and as a longing for a stable society. During the July Monarchy, Pierre Leroux, a utopian socialist who is also said to have coined the term socialism, also introduced the concept of non-legal solidarity. Auguste Comte, the so-called founder of sociology, adopted the concept in the sense of social interdependence between people. Comte linked solidarity to the concept of altruism as the opposite of egoism. Instead of emphasising the individual, altruism emphasises common responsibility and solidarity. The interpretations of Pierre Leroux and Auguste Comte gave rise to the idea of a specific social solidarity as the basis of the social order.

After the French Revolution, new scientific and ideological interpretations of solidarity emerged in France. The concept took on sociological, economic, legal, and political variants. Thinkers with different emphases shaped the meaning of the concept of solidarity to suit their own purposes. The Paris Communards, for example, exchanged the revolutionary slogan of "fraternity" for "solidarity". Some French liberal economists also began to use the term "solidarity", but they changed its meaning in an individualistic direction. Liberalists argued that interdependence between people meant that people also had to take responsibility for their actions without the state intervening. Charles Gide, an economist who opposed liberalism, developed his own interpretation of the concept and even proposed solidarity as the name of a new school of economics.

Through these stages, by the turn of the 20th century, solidarity had become a generic term that could be associated with almost everything that was considered good and progressive. The Paris World Fair in 1900 was accompanied by a congress on "social education and the new solidarity". The Catholic Church also began to use the popular concept of solidarity. According to sociologist Steven Lukes, solidarity played a role in France at the time that was almost as strong and influential as individualism was in the United States at the same time.

=== Émile Durkheim ===
According to Émile Durkheim, the types of social solidarity correlate with types of society. Durkheim introduced the terms mechanical and organic solidarity as part of his theory of the development of societies in The Division of Labour in Society (1893). In a society exhibiting mechanical solidarity, its cohesion and integration comes from the homogeneity of individuals—people feel connected through similar work, educational and religious training, and lifestyle. Mechanical solidarity normally operates in traditional small-scale societies. In tribal society, solidarity is usually based on kinship ties of familial networks. Organic solidarity comes from the interdependence that arises from specialization of work and the complementarities between people—a development which occurs in modern and industrial societies.

Although individuals perform different tasks and often have different values and interests, the order and solidarity of society depends on their reliance on each other to perform their specified tasks. "Organic" refers to the interdependence of the component parts, and thus social solidarity is maintained in more complex societies through the interdependence of its component parts (e.g., farmers produce the food to feed the factory workers who produce the tractors that allow the farmer to produce the food).

=== Léon Bourgeois ===
Although the concept of solidarity had already been used in the labor movement in the mid-19th century, it was only the liberal republicans who brought solidarity into the mainstream of French political debate. In 1896, Léon Bourgeois published his book Solidarité, which introduced the concept of solidarity into political language. Bourgeois's solidarity was based primarily on the interdependence between people, a double-edged sword that produced both security and threats. However, it was also based on the idea of social debt. According to Bourgeois, man owes society the technical and intellectual capital that social development has produced for him.

Bourgeois also introduced the term solidarism to describe a political ideology based on solidarity. Solidarism was a precise and clear structure of ideas which radicalism was also able to assimilate, and it came to regard it as its own ideological expression. After the turn of the century, Bourgeois solidarism came to be regarded almost as an official idea of the Third Republic. His solidarism combined elements of Durkheim's theory of solidarity with the theories of Louis Pasteur and Charles Darwin, and constituted an alternative to the confrontation between classical liberalism and workers collectivism. Bourgeois emphasised the solidarity generated by interdependence between people as a positive factor for all human growth. Solidarism thus combined the natural interdependence of human beings with solidarity as a moral goal. Although the idea of solidarity had different successors and interpretations, they had in common the emphasis on both the social responsibility of the state and the cooperation of citizens.

=== Charles Gide ===
Solidarity also played a central role in the thinking of the French economist Charles Gide (1847–1932). Gide set out to challenge the dominance of the liberal school of economics in France. His thinking was influenced by both biology and sociology. He was particularly influenced by Charles Fourier, who had criticised the social ills created by free market competition. Solidarity became a fundamental concept in Gide's thinking. He found manifestations of solidarity in nature, in the economy and in the social interdependencies of society, but for him solidarity was only ethically valuable when it was consciously voluntary. He created his own national economic doctrine, called Solidarism, according to which society could gradually move towards a cooperative economy in which workers themselves controlled the means of production. In Gide's thinking, the values and goals of solidarity could be pursued through cooperative associations, 'the voluntary association of well-meaning people'.

In Gide's solidarity, the common property created by free cooperative associations is their own and the added value created by their activities is returned in the form of profit sharing. Solidarism preserved the foundations of the free market economic system and also accepted differences in people's economic status. However, large income disparities were not in line with the idea of solidarity, as Gide considered them to break the ties that bind the individual to society. Gide is considered a major representative of the French historical school, and his ideas were different from the mainstream liberal economics of the time. Gide's social philosophy was close to that of Léon Walras, the developer of neoclassical general equilibrium theory, and he was one of the few supporters of Walras during his lifetime.

Solidarity is still the core value underlying cooperatives today, alongside self-reliance, ownership, equality, and justice. Cooperative members have a duty to emphasise the common interest and to ensure that all members are treated as fairly as possible. In addition to solidarity with its own members, the cooperative now also emphasises social responsibility beyond the cooperative itself.

=== Peter Kropotkin ===
Anarchist theorist Peter Kropotkin (1842–1921) connected the biological and the social in his formulation of solidarity. In his book, Mutual Aid: A Factor of Evolution (1902), written partly in response to Huxleyan Social Darwinism, Kropotkin studied the use of cooperation as a survival mechanism in human societies at their various stages, as well as with animals. According to him, mutual aid, or cooperation, within a species has been an important factor in the evolution of social institutions. Solidarity is essential for mutual aid; supportive activity towards other people does not result from the expectation of reward, but rather from instinctive feelings of solidarity. In his introduction to the book, Kropotkin wrote:

The number and importance of mutual-aid institutions which were developed by the creative genius of the savage and half-savage masses, during the earliest clan-period of mankind and still more during the next village-community period, and the immense influence which these early institutions have exercised upon the subsequent development of mankind, down to the present times, induced me to extend my researches to the later, historical periods as well; especially, to study that most interesting period—the free medieval city republics, whose universality and influence upon our modern civilization have not yet been duly appreciated. And finally, I have tried to indicate in brief the immense importance which the mutual-support instincts, inherited by mankind from its extremely long evolution, play even now in our modern society, which is supposed to rest upon the principle "every one for himself, and the State for all," but which it never has succeeded, nor will succeed in realizing".

Kropotkin advocated an alternative economic and social system, which would be coordinated through a horizontal network of voluntary associations with goods distributed in compliance with the physical needs of the individual, rather than according to labor.

=== Modern ===
Solidarity is also one of six principles of the Charter of Fundamental Rights of the European Union, and International Human Solidarity Day is recognized each year on December 20 as an international observance. Solidarity is not mentioned in the European Convention on Human Rights nor in the United Nations' Universal Declaration of Human Rights and therefore has lesser legal meaning when compared to basic rights. Concepts of solidarity are mentioned in the Universal Declaration on Bioethics and Human Rights, but not defined clearly. It is a significant concept in Catholic social teaching and in Christian democratic political ideology.

== In empirical social research ==
Alongside its treatment in social and political theory, solidarity has been studied empirically as a measurable attitude. Research in marketing and tourism, drawing explicitly on Durkheim and Marx, has developed the concept of place solidarity, defined as an individual’s compassion and sympathy with a place resulting from an observation of relative suffering. Such work has examined the consequences of place solidarity for behaviour, including consumer boycotting during the Russian invasion of Ukraine.

== Solidarity in the insurance system ==
The political philosophy of the early twentieth century, condensed into the concept of solidarity, sought to offer both a scientific theory of social interdependence and a moral solution to social problems. According to some scholars, the emergence of this new rationality was made possible by the concept of social risk and the idea and technology of insurance developed to manage it. Social risk is defined as the risk to a group of people, statistically speaking, which is caused in one way or another by their living together and which can be mitigated by a technique of joint and several liability such as insurance.

It has been said that insurance can be seen as one of the institutions of the social contract. The way insurance works requires individuals to take a collective responsibility or the events they feel the need to prepare for. Society can be said to have become 'modern' when insurance becomes social insurance and when, thanks to the techniques and institutions of insurance, the insurance model becomes both a symbolic and a functional basis for the social contract.

Solidarity and justice are key principles underpinning the insurance system, according to Risto Pelkonen and Timo Somer. In the context of voluntary personal insurance, solidarity means that the insured share the benefits and costs between themselves, while justice means that each insured contributes to the costs according to the actuarial probability. Social insurance, on the other hand, is available to all citizens, regardless of their choice and health status, as the costs are covered by tax revenues and statutory contributions.

== Solidarity as the foundation of the welfare state ==
Solidarity, or solidarism, is widely seen as the central foundation of the welfare state. Among other things, the advent of statutory social insurance and social law in the 20th century changed social thinking and enabled the breakthrough of the solidarity paradigm. The emergence of solidarity in social law can be thought of as being based on the norm of collective provisioning as the foundation of social justice. However, it can be argued that the justification for social regulation and solidarity is not necessarily a positive normative logic, but rather general civil rights. Human rights are intended to apply equally to all people and are more akin to a legal 'law' than to a normative logic. The formation of welfare policy can therefore be thought of as being based on human and civil rights with a completely different logic, rather than on a collective norm.

According to Professor Heikki Ervast, however, three basic concepts can be associated with Nordic welfare states: macro-collectivism, universalism and solidarism. In simple terms, macro-collectivism means that recipients and payers of transfers do not need to know each other. Universalism means that the social protection and services of the welfare state apply to all citizens. Solidarism means that the welfare state is not simply an instrument designed to guarantee social peace, but is based on solidarity, human dignity, and equality. Pauli Forma, Associate Professor of Social Policy at the University of Turku, has summarised the central role of solidarity as the ethical basis of the welfare state: 'The welfare state is an institution of collective solidarity'. In other words, a welfare state is a democratic and prosperous state that collectively shows solidarity by taking responsibility for the social security and equality of its citizens and for helping the disadvantaged. The welfare state can be said to be the "invisible hand of solidarity", in the same way that the "invisible hand of the market" is at work in a free market economy.

== Solidarity tax ==
A solidarity tax is a fee imposed by the government of some countries to finance projects that serve, in theory, to unify or solidarize the country. It is usually imposed for a short period of time in addition on income tax of individuals, private entrepreneurs, and legal entities. In Germany, the solidarity tax was first introduced after German reunification. The tax amounted to 7.5% of the amount of income tax payable (for individuals) and income tax payable (for legal entities). It was later abolished and reintroduced from 1995 to December 31, 1997, after which it was reduced to 5.5% on January 1, 1998. The legality of the tax was repeatedly challenged, but it was recognized by the German Federal Financial Court as not contrary to the German Constitution. The long-term assessment of the solidarity tax was considered unconstitutional in Germany.

In Italy, the solidarity tax was first introduced in 2012. All individuals whose annual gross income exceeds €300,000 are required to pay a 3% tax on the amount exceeding this amount. In France, the solidarity tax on wealth was introduced in 1981; in September 2017, the French government abolished the solidarity tax and replaced it with a wealth tax on real estate starting in 2018. It was paid by all citizens and married couples whose property exceeded 1.3 million euros on January 1. The tax ranged from 0.5% to 1.5% of the value of property exceeding 800,000 euros. In 2013, the solidarity tax was also introduced in the Czech Republic in response to economic recession and was cancelled in 2021. In this country it was 7% for all residents earning more than CZK 100,000 per month.

== Catholic social teaching ==
Solidarity is an element of Catholic social teaching. According to Pope Francis:

No one can remain insensitive to the inequalities that persist in the world... the Brazilian people, particularly the humblest among you, can offer the world a valuable lesson in solidarity, a word that is too often forgotten or silenced because it is uncomfortable... I would like to make an appeal to those in possession of greater resources, to public authorities and to all people of good will who are working for social justice: never tire of working for a more just world, marked by greater solidarity

The Church's teaching on solidarity is explained in the Compendium of the Social Doctrine of the Church, and briefly summarised in the Catechism of the Catholic Church:

1939
The principle of solidarity, also articulated in terms of "friendship" or "social charity," is a direct demand of human and Christian brotherhood
1940
Solidarity is manifested in the first place by the distribution of goods and remuneration for work. It also presupposes the effort for a more just social order where tensions are better able to be reduced and conflicts more readily settled by negotiation.
1941
Socio-economic problems can be resolved only with the help of all the forms of solidarity: solidarity of the poor among themselves, between rich and poor, of workers among themselves, between employers and employees in a business, solidarity among nations and peoples. International solidarity is a requirement of the moral order; world peace depends in part upon this
1942
The virtue of solidarity goes beyond material goods. In spreading the spiritual goods of the faith, the Church has promoted, and often opened new paths for, the development of temporal goods as well. And so throughout the centuries has the Lord's saying been verified: "Seek first his kingdom and his righteousness, and all these things shall be yours as well."

== Islamic solidarity ==
Solidarity is an important part of the teachings God sent down to the Islamic prophet Muhammad. Indeed, Muslims were called upon in the Quran to unify under one banner, that of Islam, as equals before God. This centred around principles of brotherhood (ukhuwwa), social responsibility (al-takaful al-ijtima'i) and almsgiving (zakat or sadaqa). The central teaching to Islam is to subject oneself to God, and that, in this pursuit, all are equal before Him.

IX, 60
"Alms are meant only for the poor, the needy, those who administer them, those whose hearts need winning over, to free slaves and help those in debt, for God's cause, and for travellers in need. This is ordained by God; God has the knowledge to decide."

XVI, 90
"God commands justice, doing good, and generosity towards relatives and He forbids what is shameful, blameworthy, and oppressive."

LIX, 7
"Whatever gains God has turned over to His Messenger from the inhabitants of the villages belong to God, the Messenger, kinsfolk, orphans, the needy, the traveller in need - this is so that they do not just circulate among those of you who are rich - so accept whatever the Messenger gives you, and abstain from whatever he forbids you."

This is not only applicable to the Muslim community. Other religious communities, especially the people of the book, are traditionally accepted as true believers and protected communities. This lesson is drawn from Surat al-Ma'ida, verse 48. Although opinions differ on this matter, Seyyed Hossein Nasr notes that the majority opinion of Islamic scholars is that this verse pertains to a universal acceptance of other religions.

=== Pan-Islamism ===
In modern history, pan-Islamism was an important driver of inter-Islamic solidarity movements. This movement sought to mobilize a trans-national imagined community in the wake of a perceived decline of the Muslim world to regain its former political glory. Pan-Islamism is often associated with anti-colonialism and anti-imperialism. Whilst this is true for later period, early pan-Islamic thinkers such as Jamāl al-Dīn al-Afghānī and Syed Ameer Ali sought to make use of pan-Islamic ideals to fight for Muslim rights within the colonial framework of the United Kingdom and the concert of Europe of which the Ottoman Caliphate was a part. In the 1920s, the Khalifat Movement made use of British concessions during World War I to combat the Treaty of Sèvres. And, in the 1930s, the World Islamic Congress was held in Jerusalem to negotiate a settlement for Palestinian independence within the confines of the British Mandate. Pan-Islamist ideas of society (Ar. umma, mujtamiʿ, or al-hayʾa al-ijtimāʿiyya) were characterised by modernist interpretations of Islam and a general acceptance of other religions.

Others in that period sought to implement Islamic solidarity principles from the bottom up. In Egypt, Hassan al-Banna established the Muslim Brotherhood in 1928 to organize society on the basis of Islamic ethical and social values, including social welfare and solidarity with the disenfranchised. Operating in the capitalist setting of interwar Egypt and drawing on Islamic rights to property, they made the pragmatic decision to advocate an Islamic economy that stressed Egyptian ownership over factories and emphasized social welfare.

=== Al-Takāful al-Ijtimāʿī and Islamic socialism ===
Takāful is a difficult to translate word that might best be translated as a combination of solidarity, mutual responsibility, and cooperative insurance. Thinkers like Mustafa al-Siba'i, the leader of the Syrian Muslim Brotherhood, have employed the term to argue for Islamic socialism, arguing that socialism was most in line with Islamic teachings on al-takāful al-ijtimāʿī (social solidarity). Al-Siba'i identified ten levels of social responsibility and solidarity:

1. al-takāful al-adabī (Solidarity in mannerisms)
2. al-takāful al-ʿilmī (Solidarity in providing education)
3. al-takāful al-siyāsī (Political solidarity)
4. al-takāful al-difāʿī (Solidarity in defence [of one's community])
5. al-takāful al-jināʾī (Solidarity in [solving] crime)
6. al-takāful al-akhlāqī (Solidarity in upholding morality)
7. al-takāful al-iqtiṣādī (Economic solidarity)
8. al-takāful al-ʿabādī (Solidarity in worship)
9. al-takāful al-ḥaḍārī (Solidarity amongst societal groups)
10. al-takāful al-maʿāshī (Solidarity with respect to living, i.e. taking care of the needy)

Since the 1970s, takāful became theorised in Islamic finance as "a scheme where the participants are the insureds as well as the insurers and therefore share in the loss or profit of the operator, unlike insurance companies, where the risk is borne solely by the insurers"

== Gallery ==
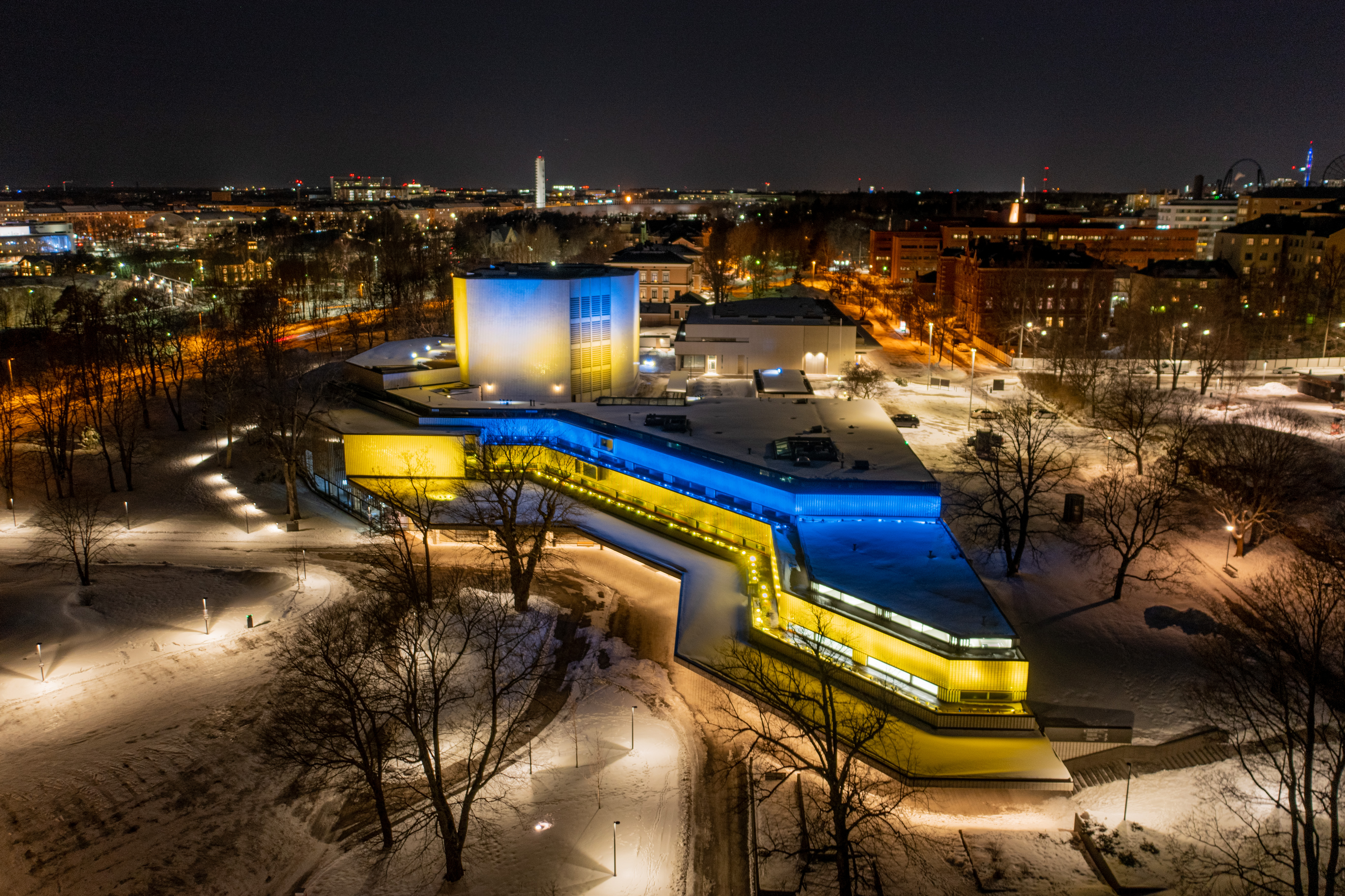
The Helsinki City Theatre in Helsinki, Finland illuminated in the colors of the flag of Ukraine, in solidarity with Ukraine during the 2022 Russian invasion of Ukraine

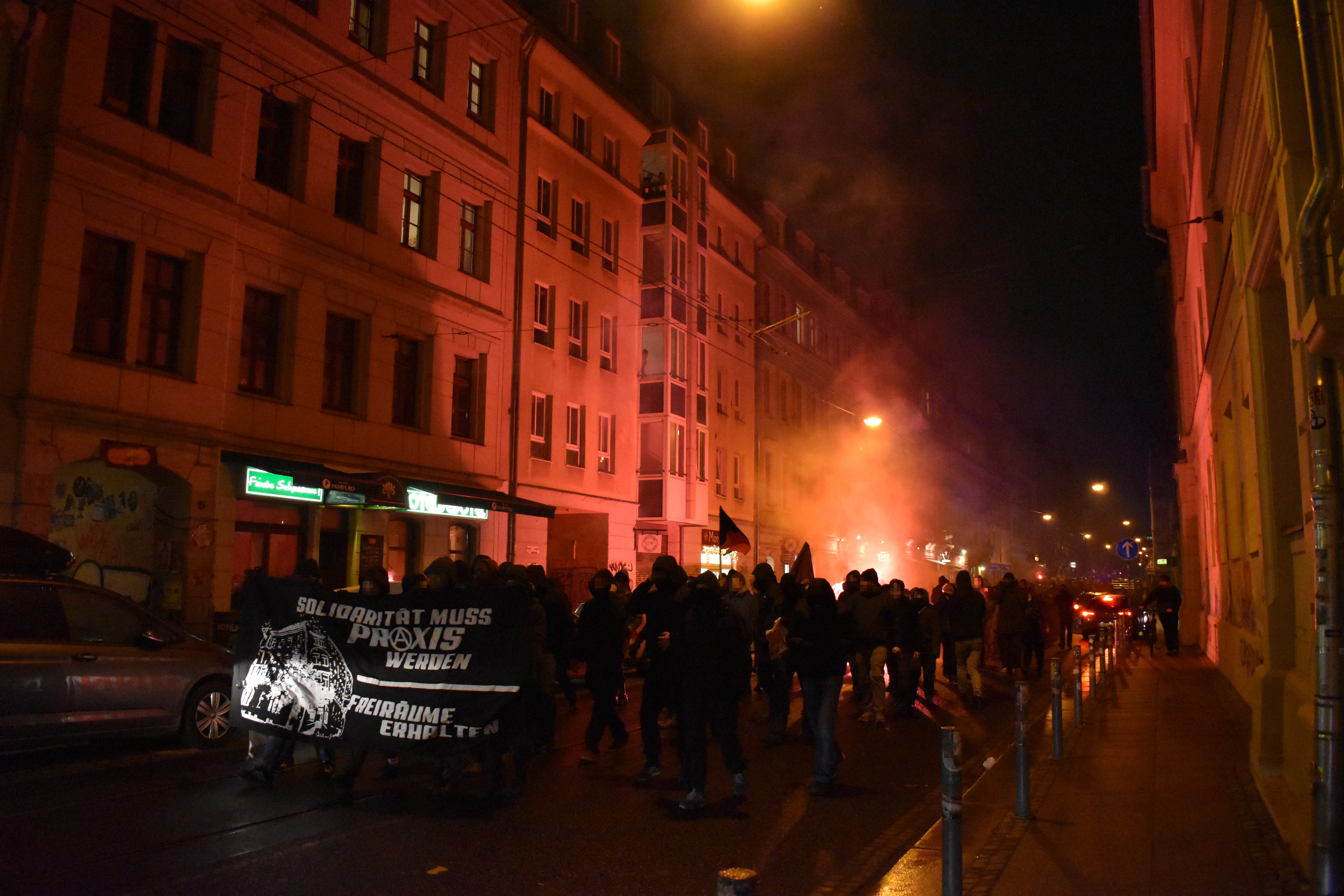
Anarchist banner Dresden Germany, translating to "Solidarity must become practice"

== See also ==
- Altruism – Concern for the well-being of others
- Autarky – Characteristic of self-sufficiency
- Classism – Discrimination on the basis of social class
- Corporatism – Political ideology which advocates the organization of society by corporate groups
- Entitativity – Concept in social psychology
- Generalized exchange – Type of social exchange
- Group cohesiveness – Bonding between members of a group
- Groupthink – Psychological phenomenon that occurs within a group of people
- Hierarchy – System of elements that are subordinated to each other
- Linked fate – Sociopolitical phenomenon
- Pan-Islamism – Movement advocating unity of Muslims under one state
- Solidarism – Political ideology
- Solidarity economy – Model of organization emphasizing cooperation and social health over profit
- "Solidarity Forever", anthem of the labor movement
