= Émile Durkheim =

French sociologist (1858–1917)

- Born: David Émile Durkheim; 15 April 1858; Épinal, France
- Died: 15 November 1917 (aged 59); Paris, France
- Education: École normale supérieure University of Berlin; Leipzig University; Marburg University
- Known for: Social fact Sacred–profane dichotomy Collective consciousness Social integration Anomie; Collective representations Collective effervescence Scientific rationalism Mechanical and organic solidarity
- Relatives: Marcel Mauss (nephew)
- Scientific career
- Fields: Philosophy, sociology, education, anthropology, religious studies
- Workplaces: University of Paris; University of Bordeaux
- Academic advisors: Émile Boutroux; Charles Renouvier
- Notable students: Maurice Halbwachs; André Lalande

David Émile Durkheim (/ˈdɜːrkhaɪm/; French: [emil dyʁkɛm] or [dyʁkajm]; 15 April 1858 – 15 November 1917) was a French sociologist. He formally established the academic discipline of sociology and is commonly cited as one of the principal architects of modern social science, along with Karl Marx and Max Weber.

Much of Durkheim's work concerns the inability of societies to maintain their integrity and coherence in modernity, an era in which traditional social and religious ties are much less universal, and in which new social institutions have come into being. His conception of the scientific study of society laid the groundwork for great modern sociology. He used such scientific tools as statistics, surveys, and historical observation in his analysis of suicides in Roman Catholic and Protestant groups.

Durkheim's first major sociological work was De la division du travail social (1893; The Division of Labour in Society), followed in 1895 by Les Règles de la méthode sociologique (The Rules of Sociological Method). Also in 1895, he set up the first European department of sociology and became France's first professor of sociology. His seminal monograph, Le Suicide (1897), a study of suicide rates in Roman Catholic and Protestant populations, pioneered modern social research, serving to distinguish social science from psychology and political philosophy. In 1898, he established the journal L'Année sociologique. Les formes élémentaires de la vie religieuse (1912; The Elementary Forms of the Religious Life) presented a theory of religion, comparing the social and cultural lives of aboriginal and modern societies.

Durkheim was preoccupied with the acceptance of sociology as a legitimate science. Refining the positivism originally set forth by Auguste Comte, he promoted what could be considered as a form of epistemological realism, as well as the use of the hypothetico-deductive model in social science. For Durkheim, sociology was the science of institutions, understanding the term in its broader meaning as the "beliefs and modes of behaviour instituted by the collectivity," with its aim being to discover structural social facts. He was a major proponent of structural functionalism, a foundational perspective in both sociology and anthropology. In his view, social science should be purely holistic (Note: "The first and most fundamental rule is: Consider social facts as things." (Durkheim 1895:14).) in the sense that sociology should study phenomena attributed to society at large, rather than being limited to the study of specific actions of individuals.

Durkheim remained a dominant force in French intellectual life until his death in 1917, presenting numerous lectures and publishing works on a variety of topics, including the sociology of knowledge, morality, social stratification, religion, law, education, and deviance. Some terms that he coined, such as "collective consciousness", are now also used by laypeople.

== Early life and education ==
David Émile Durkheim was born 15 April 1858 in Épinal, Lorraine, France, to Mélanie (Isidor) and Moïse Durkheim, coming into a long lineage of devout Alsatian Jews. His parents had four other children: Israël (1845–1846), (Note: Meštrović (1993), p. 23. "A visit to city hall yielded a fact hitherto overlooked by Durkheim's biographers, and unknown even to M. Halphen: Durkheim had an elder brother named Israël Desiré, who was born at 11 p.m., 5 January 1845, and who died on 17 September 1846.") Rosine (1848–1930), Félix (1850–1889) and Céline (1851–1931). Durkheim came from a long line of rabbis, stretching back eight generations, including his father, grandfather, and great-grandfather and began his education in a rabbinical school. However at an early age he switched schools, deciding not to follow in his family's footsteps.Durkheim led a thoroughly secular life, dedicating much of his work to the argument that religious phenomena arise from social rather than divine factors. Nevertheless, he maintained ties with both his family and the Jewish community. In fact, many of his most prominent collaborators and students were Jewish, some even being blood relatives. For instance Marcel Mauss, a notable social anthropologist of the prewar era, was his nephew.

A precocious student, Durkheim entered the École normale supérieure (ENS) in 1879, at his third attempt. The entering class that year was one of the most brilliant of the nineteenth century, as many of his classmates, such as Jean Jaurès and Henri Bergson, went on to become major figures in France's intellectual history as well. At the ENS, Durkheim studied under the direction of Numa Denis Fustel de Coulanges, a classicist with a social-scientific outlook, and wrote his Latin dissertation on Montesquieu. At the same time, he read Auguste Comte and Herbert Spencer, whereby Durkheim became interested in a scientific approach to society early on in his career. This meant the first of many conflicts with the French academic system, which had no social science curriculum at the time. Durkheim found humanistic studies uninteresting, turning his attention from psychology and philosophy to ethics and, eventually, sociology. He obtained his agrégation in philosophy in 1882, though finishing next to last in his graduating class owing to serious illness the year before.

The opportunity for Durkheim to receive a major academic appointment in Paris was inhibited by his approach to society. From 1882 to 1887 he taught philosophy at several provincial schools. In the 1885-6 school year he visited Germany, where he travelled and studied sociology at the universities of Marburg, Berlin and Leipzig. As Durkheim indicated in several essays, it was in Leipzig that he learned to appreciate the value of empiricism and its language of concrete, complex things, in sharp contrast to the more abstract, clear and simple ideas of the Cartesian method. By 1886, as part of his doctoral dissertation, he had completed the draft of his The Division of Labour in Society, and was working towards establishing the new science of sociology.

== Academic career ==
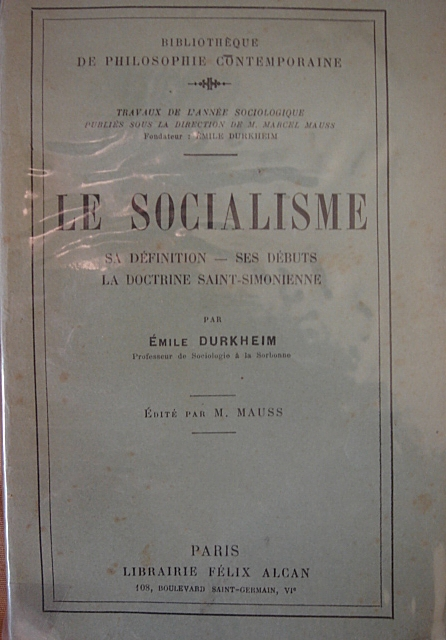
A collection of Durkheim's courses on the origins of socialism (1896), edited and published by his nephew, Marcel Mauss, in 1928

Durkheim's period in Germany resulted in the publication of numerous articles on German social science and philosophy; Durkheim was particularly impressed by the work of Wilhelm Wundt. Durkheim's articles gained recognition in France, and he received a teaching appointment in the University of Bordeaux in 1887, where he was to teach the university's first social science course. His official title was Chargé d'un Cours de Science Sociale et de Pédagogie, thus he taught both pedagogy and sociology (the latter having never been taught in France before). The appointment of the social scientist to the mostly humanistic faculty was an important sign of changing times and the growing importance and recognition of the social sciences. From this position Durkheim helped reform the French school system, introducing the study of social science in its curriculum. However, his controversial beliefs that religion and morality could be explained in terms purely of social interaction earned him many critics. Also in 1887, Durkheim married Louise Dreyfus. They had two children, Marie and André.

The 1890s were a period of remarkable creative output for Durkheim. In 1893, he published The Division of Labour in Society, his doctoral dissertation and fundamental statement of the nature of human society and its development. Durkheim's interest in social phenomena was spurred on by politics. The Second French Empire's defeat in the Franco-Prussian War led to the fall of the regime of Napoleon III, which was then replaced by the French Third Republic. This in turn resulted in a backlash against the new secular and republican rule, as many people considered a vigorously nationalistic approach necessary to rejuvenate France's fading power. Durkheim, a Jew and a staunch supporter of the French Third Republic with a sympathy towards socialism, was thus in the political minority, a situation that galvanized him politically. The Dreyfus affair of 1894 only strengthened his activist stance.

In 1895, he published The Rules of Sociological Method, a manifesto stating what sociology is and how it ought to be done, and founded the first European department of sociology at the University of Bordeaux. In 1898, he founded L'Année sociologique, the first French social science journal. Its aim was to publish and publicize the work of what was, by then, a growing number of students and collaborators (this is also the name used to refer to the group of students who developed his sociological program). In 1897, he published Suicide, a case study that provided an example of what a sociological monograph might look like. Durkheim was one of the pioneers of the use of quantitative methods in criminology, which he used in his study of suicide.

By 1902, Durkheim had finally achieved his goal of attaining a prominent position in Paris when he became the chair of education at the Sorbonne. Durkheim had aimed for the position earlier, but the Parisian faculty took longer to accept what some called "sociological imperialism" and admit social science to their curriculum. He became a full professor (specifically, Professor of the Science of Education) there in 1906, and in 1913 he was named chair in "Education and Sociology". Because French universities are technically institutions for training secondary school teachers, this position gave Durkheim considerable influence—his lectures were the only ones that were mandatory for the entire student body. Durkheim had much influence over the new generation of teachers; around that time he also served as an advisor to the Ministry of Education. In 1912, he published his last major work, The Elementary Forms of the Religious Life.

== Death ==
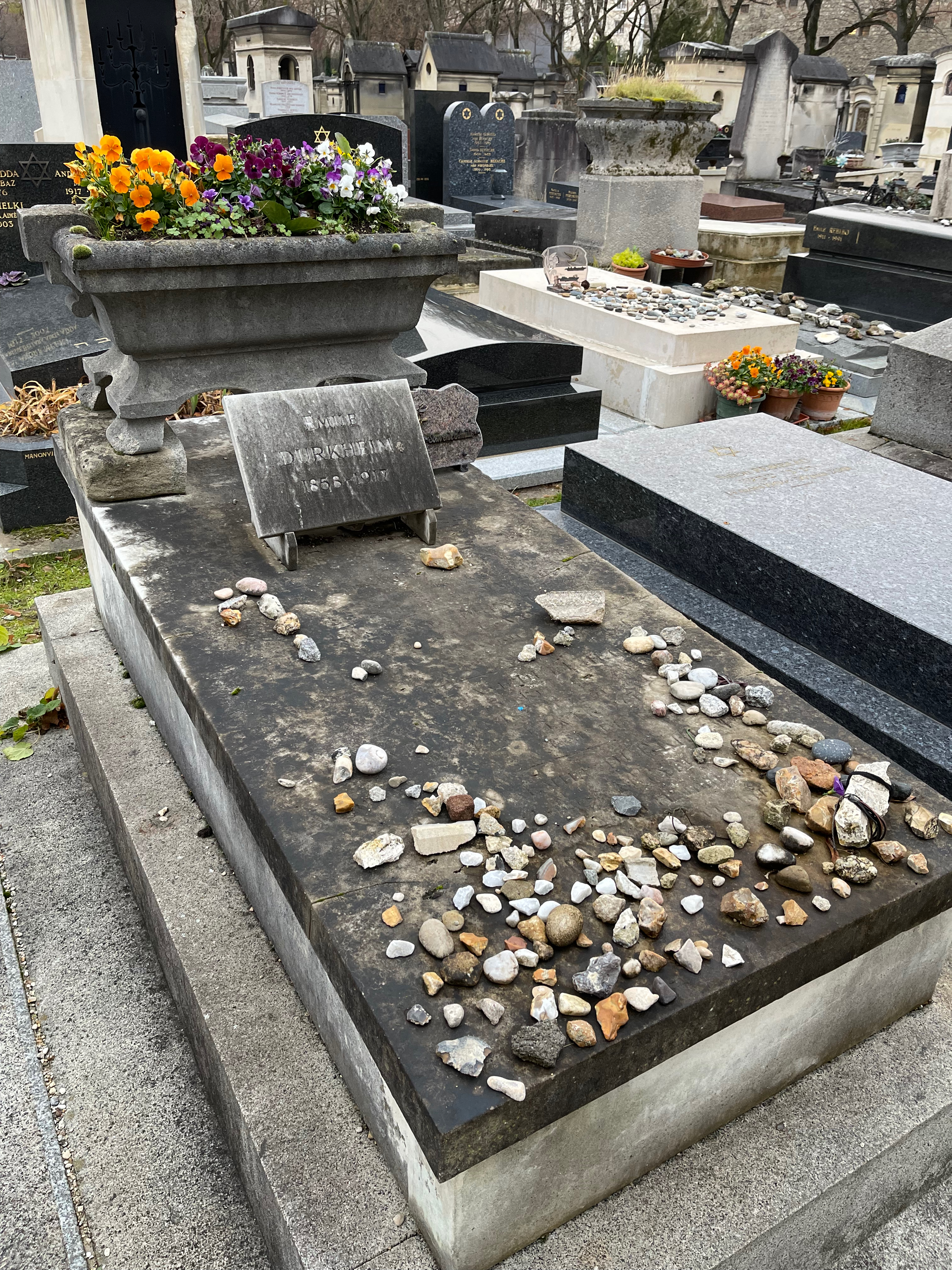
Grave of Émile Durkheim, the founder of sociology, in Montparnasse Cemetery, Paris, France

The outbreak of World War I was to have a tragic effect on Durkheim's life. His leftism was always patriotic rather than internationalist, in that he sought a secular, rational form of French life. However, the onset of the war, and the inevitable nationalist propaganda that followed, made it difficult to sustain this already nuanced position. While Durkheim actively worked to support his country in the war, his reluctance to give in to simplistic nationalist fervor (combined with his Jewish background) made him a natural target of the now-ascendant French Right. Even more seriously, the generations of students that Durkheim had trained were now being drafted to serve in the army, many of them perishing in the trenches.

Finally, Durkheim's own son, André, died on the war front in December 1915—a loss from which Durkheim never recovered. Emotionally devastated, Durkheim collapsed of a stroke in Paris two years later, on 15 November 1917. He was buried at the Montparnasse Cemetery in Paris.

== Methodology ==
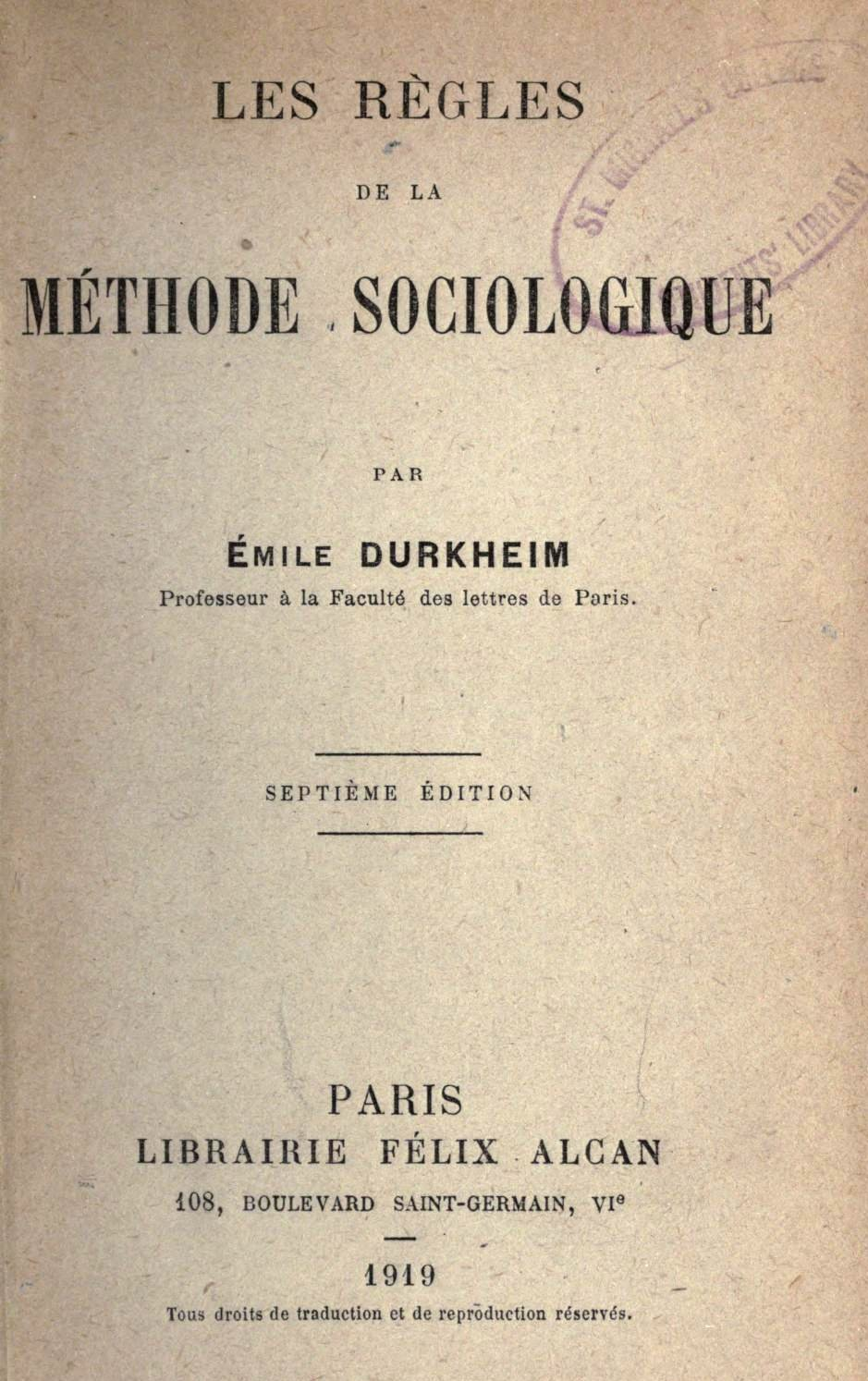
Cover of the French edition of The Rules of Sociological Method (1919)

In The Rules of Sociological Method (1895), Durkheim expressed his desire to establish a method that would guarantee sociology's truly scientific character. One of the questions raised concerns the objectivity of the sociologist: how may one study an object that, from the very beginning, conditions and relates to the observer? According to Durkheim, observation must be as impartial and impersonal as possible, even though a "perfectly objective observation" in this sense may never be attained. A social fact must always be studied according to its relation with other social facts, never according to the individual who studies it. Sociology should therefore privilege comparison rather than the study of singular independent facts. (Note: Collins (1975), p. 539: "Durkheim was the first to seriously use the comparative method correctly in the scientific sense.")

Durkheim sought to create one of the first rigorous scientific approaches to social phenomena. Along with Herbert Spencer, he was one of the first people to explain the existence and quality of different parts of a society through referencing what function they served in maintaining the quotidian (i.e. by how they make society "work"). He also agreed with Spencer's organic analogy, comparing society to a living organism. As a result, his work is sometimes seen as a precursor to functionalism. Durkheim also insisted that society was more than the sum of its parts. (Note: Durkheim (1960/1892), p. 9: "Science cannot describe individuals, but only types. If human societies cannot be classified, they must remain inaccessible to scientific description.")

Unlike his contemporaries Ferdinand Tönnies and Max Weber, he did not focus on what motivates individuals' actions (an approach associated with methodological individualism), but rather on the study of social facts.

== Inspirations ==
During his university studies at the ENS, Durkheim was influenced by two neo-Kantian scholars: Charles Renouvier and Émile Boutroux. The principles Durkheim absorbed from them included rationalism, scientific study of morality, anti-utilitarianism, and secular education. His methodology was influenced by Numa Denis Fustel de Coulanges, a supporter of the scientific method.

=== Comte ===
A fundamental influence on Durkheim's thought was the sociological positivism of Auguste Comte, who effectively sought to extend and apply the scientific method found in the natural sciences to the social sciences. According to Comte, a true social science should stress empirical facts, as well as induce general scientific laws from the relationship among these facts. There were many points on which Durkheim agreed with the positivist thesis:

- First, he accepted that the study of society was to be founded on an examination of facts.
- Second, like Comte, he acknowledged that the only valid guide to objective knowledge was the scientific method.
- Third, he agreed with Comte that the social sciences could become scientific only when they were stripped of their metaphysical abstractions.

=== Realism ===
A second influence on Durkheim's view of society beyond Comte's positivism was the epistemological outlook called social realism. Although he never explicitly espoused it, Durkheim adopted a realist perspective in order to demonstrate the existence of social realities outside the individual and to show that these realities existed in the form of the objective relations of society. As an epistemology of science, realism can be defined as a perspective that takes as its central point of departure the view that external social realities exist in the outer world and that these realities are independent of the individual's perception of them.

This view opposes other predominant philosophical perspectives such as empiricism and positivism. Empiricists, like David Hume, had argued that all realities in the outside world are products of human sense perception, thus all realities are merely perceived: they do not exist independently of our perceptions, and have no causal power in themselves. Comte's positivism went a step further by claiming that scientific laws could be deduced from empirical observations. Going beyond this, Durkheim claimed that sociology would not only discover "apparent" laws, but would be able to discover the inherent nature of society.

=== Judaism ===
Scholars also debate the exact influence of Jewish thought on Durkheim's work. The answer remains uncertain; some scholars have argued that Durkheim's thought is a form of secularized Jewish thought, (Note: Meštrović (1993), p. 37: "While Durkheim did not become a Rabbi, he may have transformed his father's philosophical and moral concerns into something new, his version of sociology.") while others argue that proving the existence of a direct influence of Jewish thought on Durkheim's achievements is difficult or impossible.

== Durkheim and theory ==
Throughout his career, Durkheim was concerned primarily with three goals. First, to establish sociology as a new academic discipline. Second, to analyze how societies could maintain their integrity and coherence in the modern era, when things such as shared religious and ethnic background could no longer be assumed. To that end he wrote much about the effect of laws, religion, education and similar forces on society and social integration. Lastly, Durkheim was concerned with the practical implications of scientific knowledge. The importance of social integration is expressed throughout Durkheim's work:

For if society lacks the unity that derives from the fact that the relationships between its parts are exactly regulated, that unity resulting from the harmonious articulation of its various functions assured by effective discipline and if, in addition, society lacks the unity based upon the commitment of men's wills to a common objective, then it is no more than a pile of sand that the least jolt or the slightest puff will suffice to scatter.

— Moral Education (1925)

=== Establishing sociology ===
Durkheim authored some of the most programmatic statements on what sociology is and how it should be practiced. His concern was to establish sociology as a science. Arguing for a place for sociology among other sciences, he wrote, "sociology is, then, not an auxiliary of any other science; it is itself a distinct and autonomous science."

To give sociology a place in the academic world and to ensure that it is a legitimate science, it must have an object that is clear and distinct from philosophy or psychology, and its own methodology. He argued that "there is in every society a certain group of phenomena which may be differentiated from those studied by the other natural sciences."

In the Tarde-Durkheim debate of 1903, the "anthropological view" of Gabriel Tarde was ridiculed and hastily dismissed.

A fundamental aim of sociology is to discover structural "social facts". The establishment of sociology as an independent, recognized academic discipline is among Durkheim's largest and most lasting legacies. Within sociology, his work has significantly influenced structuralism or structural functionalism.

=== Social facts ===
A social fact is every way of acting, fixed or not, capable of exercising on the individual an external constraint; or again, every way of acting which is general throughout a given society, while at the same time existing in its own right independent of its individual manifestations.

— The Rules of Sociological Method

Durkheim's work revolved around the study of social facts, a term he coined to describe phenomena that have an existence in and of themselves, are not bound to the actions of individuals, but have a coercive influence upon them. Durkheim argued that social facts have, sui generis, an independent existence greater and more objective than the actions of the individuals that compose society. Only such social facts can explain the observed social phenomena. Being exterior to the individual person, social facts may thus also exercise coercive power on the various people composing society, as it can sometimes be observed in the case of formal laws and regulations, but also in situations implying the presence of informal rules, such as religious rituals or family norms. Unlike the facts studied in natural sciences, a social fact thus refers to a specific category of phenomena: "the determining cause of a social fact must be sought among the antecedent social facts and not among the states of the individual consciousness."

Such facts are endowed with a power of coercion, by reason of which they may control individual behaviors. According to Durkheim, these phenomena cannot be reduced to biological or psychological grounds. Social facts can be material (i.e. physical objects ) or immaterial (i.e. meanings, sentiments, etc.). Though the latter cannot be seen or touched, they are external and coercive, thus becoming real and gaining "facticity". Physical objects, too, can represent both material and immaterial social facts. For example, a flag is a physical social fact that is often ingrained with various immaterial social facts (e.g. its meaning and importance).

Many social facts, however, have no material form. Even the most "individualistic" or "subjective" phenomena, such as love, freedom, or suicide, were regarded by Durkheim as objective social facts. Individuals composing society do not directly cause suicide: suicide, as a social fact, exists independently in society, and is caused by other social facts—such as rules governing behavior and group attachment—whether an individual likes it or not. Whether a person "leaves" a society does not alter the fact that this society will still contain suicides. Suicide, like other immaterial social facts, exists independently of the will of an individual, cannot be eliminated, and is as influential—coercive—as physical laws like gravity. Sociology's task therefore consists of discovering the qualities and characteristics of such social facts, which can be discovered through a quantitative or experimental approach (Durkheim extensively relied on statistics). (Note: Hassard (1995), p. 15: "Suicide…is indeed the paradigm case of Durkheim's positivism: it remains the exemplar of the sociological application of statistics.")

=== Society, collective consciousness, and culture ===
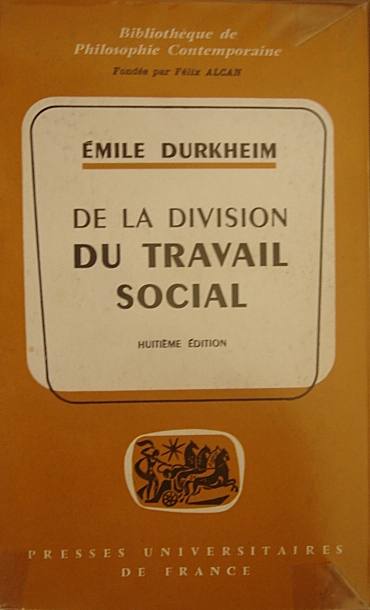
Cover of the French edition of The Division of Labour in Society

Regarding the society itself, like social institutions in general, Durkheim saw it as a set of social facts. Even more than "what society is," Durkheim was interested in answering "how is a society created" and "what holds a society together." In The Division of Labour in Society, Durkheim attempts to answer the latter question.

==== Collective consciousness ====
Durkheim assumes that humans are inherently egoistic, while "collective consciousness" (i.e. norms, beliefs, and values) forms the moral basis of the society, resulting in social integration. Collective consciousness is therefore of key importance to the society; its requisite function without which the society cannot survive. This consciousness produces the society and holds it together, while, at the same time, individuals produce collective consciousness through their interactions. Through collective consciousness human beings become aware of one another as social beings, not just animals.

The totality of beliefs and sentiments common to the average members of a society forms a determinate system with a life of its own. It can be termed the collective or common consciousness.

In particular, the emotional part of the collective consciousness overrides our egoism: as we are emotionally bound to culture, we act socially because we recognize it is the responsible, moral way to act. A key to forming society is social interaction, and Durkheim believes that human beings, when in a group, will inevitably act in such a way that a society is formed.

==== Culture ====
Groups, when interacting, create their own culture and attach powerful emotions to it, thus making culture another key social fact. Durkheim was one of the first scholars to consider the question of culture so intensely. Durkheim was interested in cultural diversity, and how the existence of diversity nonetheless fails to destroy a society. To that, Durkheim answered that any apparent cultural diversity is overridden by a larger, common, and more generalized cultural system, and the law.

In a socio-evolutionary approach, Durkheim described the evolution of societies from mechanical solidarity to organic solidarity (one rising from mutual need). As societies become more complex, evolving from mechanical to organic solidarity, the division of labour is counteracting and replacing to collective consciousness. In the simpler societies, people are connected to others due to personal ties and traditions; in the larger, modern society they are connected due to increased reliance on others with regard to them performing their specialized tasks needed for the modern, highly complex society to survive. In mechanical solidarity, people are self-sufficient, there is little integration, and thus there is the need for use of force and repression to keep society together. Also, in such societies, people have much fewer options in life. In organic solidarity, people are much more integrated and interdependent, and specialization and cooperation are extensive. Progress from mechanical to organic solidarity is based first on population growth and increasing population density, second on increasing "morality density" (development of more complex social interactions) and thirdly, on the increasing specialization in workplace. One of the ways mechanical and organic societies differ is the function of law: in mechanical society the law is focused on its punitive aspect, and aims to reinforce the cohesion of the community, often by making the punishment public and extreme; whereas in the organic society the law focuses on repairing the damage done and is more focused on individuals than the community.

One of the main features of the modern, organic society is the importance, sacredness even, given to the concept—social fact—of the individual. The individual, rather than the collective, becomes the focus of rights and responsibilities, the center of public and private rituals holding the society together—a function once performed by the religion. To stress the importance of this concept, Durkheim talked of the "cult of the individual":

Thus very far from there being the antagonism between the individual and society which is often claimed, moral individualism, the cult of the individual, is in fact the product of society itself. It is society that instituted it and made of man the god whose servant it is.

Durkheim saw the population density and growth as key factors in the evolution of the societies and advent of modernity. As the number of people in a given area increase, so does the number of interactions, and the society becomes more complex. Growing competition between the more numerous people also leads to further division of labour. In time, the importance of the state, the law and the individual increases, while that of the religion and moral solidarity decreases.

In another example of evolution of culture, Durkheim pointed to fashion, although in this case he noted a more cyclical phenomenon. According to Durkheim, fashion serves to differentiate between lower classes and upper classes, but because lower classes want to look like the upper classes, they will eventually adapt the upper class fashion, depreciating it, and forcing the upper class to adopt a new fashion.

=== Social pathology and crime ===
As the society, Durkheim noted there are several possible pathologies that could lead to a breakdown of social integration and disintegration of the society: the two most important ones are anomie and forced division of labour; lesser ones include the lack of coordination and suicide. To Durkheim, anomie refers to a lack of social norms; where too rapid of population growth reduces the amount of interaction between various groups, which in turn leads to a breakdown of understanding (i.e. norms, values, etc.). Forced division of labour, on the other hand, refers to a situation in which those who hold power, driven by their desire for profit, which can result in greed, results in people doing work that they are unsuited for. Such people are unhappy, and their desire to change the system can destabilize the society.

Durkheim's views on crime were a departure from conventional notions. He believed that crime is "bound up with the fundamental conditions of all social life" and serves a social function. He states that crime implies "not only that the way remains open to necessary changes but that in certain cases it directly prepares these changes." Examining the trial of Socrates, he argues that "his crime, namely, the independence of his thought, rendered a service not only to humanity but to his country" as "it served to prepare a new morality and faith that the Athenians needed." As such, his crime "was a useful prelude to reforms." In this sense, he saw crime as being able to release certain social tensions and so have a cleansing or purging effect in society.

The authority which the moral conscience enjoys must not be excessive; otherwise, no-one would dare to criticize it, and it would too easily congeal into an immutable form. To make progress, individual originality must be able to express itself…[even] the originality of the criminal…shall also be possible.

==== Deviance ====
Durkheim thought deviance to be an essential component of a functional society. He believed that deviance had three possible effects on society:

1. Deviance challenges the perspective and thoughts of the general population, leading to social change by pointing out a flaw in society.
2. Deviant acts may support existing social norms and beliefs by evoking the population to discipline the actors.
3. Reactions to deviant activity could increase camaraderie and social support among the population affected by the activity.

Durkheim's thoughts on deviance contributed to Robert Merton's Strain Theory.

==== Suicide ====
In Suicide (1897), Durkheim explores the differing suicide rates among Protestants and Roman Catholics, arguing that stronger social control among Roman Catholics results in lower suicide rates. According to Durkheim, Roman Catholic society has normal levels of integration while Protestant society has low levels. Overall, Durkheim treated suicide as a social fact, explaining variations in its rate on a macro level, considering society-scale phenomena such as lack of connections between people (group attachment) and lack of regulations of behavior, rather than individuals' feelings and motivations.

Durkheim believed there was more to suicide than extremely personal individual life circumstances such as loss of a job, divorce, or bankruptcy. Instead, Durkheim explained suicide as a symptom of collective social deviance, like alcoholism or homicide.

He created a normative theory of suicide focusing on the conditions of group life. Proposing four different types of suicide, which include egoistic, altruistic, anomic, and fatalistic, Durkheim began his theory by plotting social regulation on the x-axis of his chart, and social integration on the y-axis:

- Egoistic suicide corresponds to a low level of social integration. When one is not well integrated into a social group it can lead to a feeling that they have not made a difference in anyone's lives.
- Altruistic suicide corresponds to too much social integration. This occurs when a group dominates the life of an individual to a degree where they feel meaningless to society.
- Anomic suicide occurs when one has an insufficient amount of social regulation. This stems from the sociological term anomie, meaning a sense of aimlessness or despair that arises from the inability to reasonably expect life to be predictable.
- Fatalistic suicide results from too much social regulation. An example of this would be when one follows the same routine day after day. This leads to a belief that there is nothing good to look forward to. Durkheim suggested this was the most popular form of suicide for prisoners.

This study has been extensively discussed by later scholars and several major criticisms have emerged. First, Durkheim took most of his data from earlier researchers, notably Adolph Wagner and Henry Morselli, who were much more careful in generalizing from their own data. Second, later researchers found that the Protestant–Catholic differences in suicide seemed to be limited to German-speaking Europe and thus may have always been the spurious reflection of other factors. Durkheim's study of suicide has been criticized as an example of the logical error termed the ecological fallacy. However, diverging views have contested whether Durkheim's work really contained an ecological fallacy. More recent authors such as Berk (2006) have also questioned the micro–macro relations underlying Durkheim's work. Some, such as Inkeles (1959), Johnson (1965), and Gibbs (1968), have claimed that Durkheim's only intent was to explain suicide sociologically within a holistic perspective, emphasizing that "he intended his theory to explain variation among social environments in the incidence of suicide, not the suicides of particular individuals."

Despite its limitations, Durkheim's work on suicide has influenced proponents of control theory, and is often mentioned as a classic sociological study. The book pioneered modern social research and served to distinguish social science from psychology and political philosophy.

=== Religion ===
In The Elementary Forms of the Religious Life (1912), Durkheim's first purpose was to identify the social origin and function of religion as he felt that religion was a source of camaraderie and solidarity. His second purpose was to identify links between certain religions in different cultures, finding a common denominator. He wanted to understand the empirical, social aspect of religion that is common to all religions and goes beyond the concepts of spirituality and God.

Durkheim defined religion as:

"a unified system of beliefs and practices relative to sacred things, i.e., things set apart and forbidden—beliefs and practices which unite in one single moral community called a Church, all those who adhere to them."

In this definition, Durkheim avoids references to supernatural or God. Durkheim rejected earlier definitions by Tylor that religion was "belief in supernatural beings," finding that primitive societies such as the Australian Aboriginals (following the ethnologies of Spencer and Gillen, largely discredited later) did not divide reality into "natural" vs. "supernatural" realms, but rather into realms of the "sacred" and the "profane," which were not moral categories, since both could include what was good or evil. Durkheim argues we are left with the following three concepts:

- The sacred: ideas and sentiments kindled by the spectacle of society and which inspire awe, spiritual devotion or respect;
- The beliefs & practices: creating an emotional state of collective effervescence, investing symbols with sacred importance;
- The moral community: a group of people sharing a common moral philosophy.

Out of those three concepts, Durkheim focused on the sacred, noting that it is at the very core of a religion:

They are only collective forces hypostasized, that is to say, moral forces; they are made up of the ideas and sentiments awakened in us by the spectacle of society, and not of sensations coming from the physical world. (Note: Durkheim 1915, p. 322: "They are not homogeneous with the visible things among which we place them. They may well take from these things the outward and material forms in which they are represented, but they owe none of their efficacy to them. They are not united by external bonds to the different supports upon which they alight; they have no roots there; according to an expression we have already used and which serves best for characterizing them, they are added to them. So there are no objects which are predestined to receive them, to the exclusion of all others; even the most insignificant and vulgar may do so; accidental circumstances decide which are the chosen ones.")

Durkheim saw religion as the most fundamental social institution of humankind, and one that gave rise to other social forms. It was religion that gave humanity the strongest sense of collective consciousness. Durkheim saw religion as a force that emerged in the early hunter-gatherer societies, as the emotions collective effervescence run high in the growing groups, forcing them to act in a new ways, and giving them a sense of some hidden force driving them. Over time, as emotions became symbolized and interactions ritualized, religion became more organized, giving a rise to the division between the sacred and the profane. However, Durkheim also believed that religion was becoming less important, as it was being gradually superseded by science and the cult of an individual.

Thus there is something eternal in religion which is destined to survive all the particular symbols in which religious thought has successively enveloped itself.

However, even if the religion was losing its importance for Durkheim, it still laid the foundation of modern society and the interactions that governed it. And despite the advent of alternative forces, Durkheim argued that no replacement for the force of religion had yet been created. He expressed his doubt about modernity, seeing the modern times as "a period of transition and moral mediocrity."

Durkheim also argued that our primary categories for understanding the world have their origins in religion. It is religion, Durkheim writes, that gave rise to most if not all other social constructs, including the larger society. Durkheim argued that categories are produced by the society, and thus are collective creations. Thus as people create societies, they also create categories, but at the same time, they do so unconsciously, and the categories are prior to any individual's experience. In this way Durkheim attempted to bridge the divide between seeing categories as constructed out of human experience and as logically prior to that experience. Our understanding of the world is shaped by social facts; for example the notion of time is defined by being measured through a calendar, which in turn was created to allow us to keep track of our social gatherings and rituals; those in turn on their most basic level originated from religion. In the end, even the most logical and rational pursuit of science can trace its origins to religion. Durkheim states that, "Religion gave birth to all that is essential in the society."

In his work, Durkheim focused on totemism, the religion of the Aboriginal Australians and Native Americans. Durkheim saw this religion as the most ancient religion, and focused on it as he believed its simplicity would ease the discussion of the essential elements of religion. As such, he wrote:

Now the totem is the flag of the clan. It is therefore natural that the impressions aroused by the clan in individual minds—impressions of dependence and of increased vitality—should fix themselves to the idea of the totem rather than that of the clan: for the clan is too complex a reality to be represented clearly in all its complex unity by such rudimentary intelligences.

Durkheim's work on religion was criticized on both empirical and theoretical grounds by specialists in the field. The most important critique came from Durkheim's contemporary, Arnold van Gennep, an expert on religion and ritual, and also on Australian belief systems. Van Gennep argued that Durkheim's views of primitive peoples and simple societies were "entirely erroneous". Van Gennep further argued that Durkheim demonstrated a lack of critical stance towards his sources, collected by traders and priests, naively accepting their veracity, and that Durkheim interpreted freely from dubious data. At the conceptual level, van Gennep pointed out Durkheim's tendency to press ethnography into a prefabricated theoretical scheme.

Despite such critiques, Durkheim's work on religion has been widely praised for its theoretical insight and whose arguments and propositions, according to Robert Alun Jones, "have stimulated the interest and excitement of several generations of sociologists irrespective of theoretical 'school' or field of specialization."

=== Sociology of knowledge ===
While Durkheim's work deals with a number of subjects, including suicide, the family, social structures, and social institutions, a large part of his work deals with the sociology of knowledge.

While publishing short articles on the subject earlier in his career, (Note: For example, the essay De quelques formes primitives de classification (1902), written with Marcel Mauss.) Durkheim's definitive statement concerning the sociology of knowledge comes in his 1912 magnum opus, The Elementary Forms of Religious Life. This book has as its goal not only the elucidation of the social origins and function of religion, but also the social origins and impact of society on language and logical thought. Durkheim worked largely out of a Kantian framework and sought to understand how the concepts and categories of logical thought could arise out of social life. He argued, for example, that the categories of space and time were not a priori. Rather, the category of space depends on a society's social grouping and geographical use of space, and a group's social rhythm that determines our understanding of time. In this Durkheim sought to combine elements of rationalism and empiricism, arguing that certain aspects of logical thought common to all humans did exist, but that they were products of collective life (thus contradicting the tabula rasa empiricist understanding whereby categories are acquired by individual experience alone), and that they were not universal a prioris (as Kant argued) since the content of the categories differed from society to society. (Note: See Durkheim (1912) p. 14–17, 19–22.)

==== Collective representations ====
Another key elements to Durkheim's theory of knowledge outlined in Elementary Forms is the concept of représentations collectives ("collective representations"). Représentations collectives are the symbols and images that come to represent the ideas, beliefs, and values elaborated by a collectivity and are not reducible to individual constituents. They can include words, slogans, ideas, or any number of material items that can serve as a symbol, such as a cross, a rock, a temple, a feather etc. As Durkheim elaborates, représentations collectives are created through intense social interaction and are products of collective activity. As such, these representations have the particular, and somewhat contradictory, aspect that they exist externally to the individual—since they are created and controlled not by the individual but by society as a whole—yet, simultaneously within each individual of the society, by virtue of that individual's participation within society.

Arguably the most important "représentations collectives" is language, which according to Durkheim is a product of collective action. And because language is a collective action, language contains within it a history of accumulated knowledge and experience that no individual would be capable of creating on their own:

If concepts were only general ideas, they would not enrich knowledge a great deal, for, as we have already pointed out, the general contains nothing more than the particular. But if before all else they are collective representations, they add to that which we can learn by our own personal experience all that wisdom and science which the group has accumulated in the course of centuries. Thinking by concepts, is not merely seeing reality on its most general side, but it is projecting a light upon the sensation which illuminates it, penetrates it and transforms it.

As such, language, as a social product, literally structures and shapes our experience of reality. This discursive approach to language and society was developed by later French philosophers, such as Michel Foucault.

=== Morality ===
How many times, indeed, it [crime] is only an anticipation of future morality - a step toward what will be! — Émile Durkheim, Division of Labour in Society

Durkheim defines morality as "a system of rules for conduct". His analysis of morality is influenced by Immanuel Kant and his notion of duty. While Durkheim was influenced by Kant, he was critical of aspects of the latter's moral theory and developed his own positions.

Durkheim agrees with Kant that within morality, there is an element of obligation, "a moral authority which, by manifesting itself in certain precepts particularly important to it, confers upon [moral rules] an obligatory character." Morality tells us how to act from a position of superiority. There exists a certain, pre-established moral norm to which we must conform. It is through this view that Durkheim makes a first critique of Kant in saying that moral duties originate in society, and are not to be found in some universal moral concept such as the categorical imperative. Durkheim also argues that morality is characterized not just by this obligation, but is also something that is desired by the individual. The individual believes that by adhering to morality, they are serving the common Good, and for this reason, the individual submits voluntarily to the moral commandment.

However, in order to accomplish its aims, morality must be legitimate in the eyes of those to whom it speaks. As Durkheim argues, this moral authority is primarily to be located in religion, which is why in any religion one finds a code of morality. For Durkheim, it is only society that has the resources, the respect, and the power to cultivate within an individual both the obligatory and the desirous aspects of morality.

== Influence and legacy ==
Durkheim has had an important impact on the development of anthropology and sociology as disciplines. The establishment of sociology as an independent, recognized academic discipline, in particular, is among Durkheim's largest and most lasting legacies. Within sociology, his work has significantly influenced structuralism, or structural functionalism. Scholars inspired by Durkheim include Jonathan Haidt, Marcel Mauss, Maurice Halbwachs, Célestin Bouglé, Gustave Belot, Alfred Radcliffe-Brown, Talcott Parsons, Robert K. Merton, Jean Piaget, Claude Lévi-Strauss, Ferdinand de Saussure, Michel Foucault, Clifford Geertz, Peter Berger, social reformer Patrick Hunout, and others.

More recently, Durkheim has influenced sociologists such as Steven Lukes, Robert N. Bellah, and Pierre Bourdieu. His description of collective consciousness also influenced Ziya Gökalp, the founder of Turkish sociology who replaced Durkheim's concept of society with nation. An ideologue who provided the intellectual justification for the Ottoman Empire's wars of aggression and massive demographic engineering—including the Armenian genocide—he could be considered to pervert Durkheim's ideas. Randall Collins has developed a theory of what he calls interaction ritual chains, a synthesis of Durkheim's work on religion with that of Erving Goffman's micro-sociology. Goffman himself was also influenced by Durkheim in his development of the interaction order.

Outside of sociology, Durkheim has influenced philosophers, including Henri Bergson and Emmanuel Levinas, and his ideas can be identified, inexplicitly, in the work of certain structuralist theorists of the 1960s, such as Alain Badiou, Louis Althusser, and Michel Foucault. (Note: Bourdieu & Passeron (1967), pp. 167–68: "For, speaking more generally, all the social sciences now live in the house of Durkheimism, unbeknownst to them, as it were, because they walked into it backwards.")

=== Durkheim contra Searle ===
Much of Durkheim's work remains unacknowledged in philosophy, despite its direct relevance. As proof, one can look to John Searle, whose book, The Construction of Social Reality, elaborates a theory of social facts and collective representations that Searle believed to be a landmark work that would bridge the gap between analytic and continental philosophy. Neil Gross, however, demonstrates how Searle's views on society are more or less a reconstitution of Durkheim's theories of social facts, social institutions, collective representations, and the like. Searle's ideas are thus open to the same criticisms as Durkheim's. Searle responded by arguing that Durkheim's work was worse than he had originally believed, and, admitting that he had not read much of Durkheim's work: "Because Durkheim's account seemed so impoverished I did not read any further in his work." Stephen Lukes, however, responded to Searle's reply to Gross, refuting, point by point, the allegations that Searle makes against Durkheim, essentially upholding the argument of Gross, that Searle's work bears great resemblance to that of Durkheim. Lukes attributes Searle's miscomprehension of Durkheim's work to the fact that Searle, quite simply, never read Durkheim.

=== Gilbert pro Durkheim ===
Margaret Gilbert, a contemporary British philosopher of social phenomena, has offered a close, sympathetic reading of Durkheim's discussion of social facts in the first chapter and the prefaces of The Rules of Sociological Method. In her 1989 book, On Social Facts—the title of which may represent an homage to Durkheim, alluding to his "faits sociaux"—Gilbert argues that some of his statements that may seem to be philosophically untenable are important and fruitful.

== Selected works ==
- "Montesquieu's contributions to the formation of social science" (1892)
- The Division of Labour in Society (1893)
- The Rules of Sociological Method (1895)
- Suicide (1897)
- The Prohibition of Incest and its Origins (1897), in L'Année Sociologique 1:1–70
- Sociology and its Scientific Domain (1900), translation of an Italian text entitled "La sociologia e il suo dominio scientifico"
- Primitive Classification (1903), in collaboration with Marcel Mauss
- The Elementary Forms of Religious Life (1912)
- Who Wanted War? (1914), in collaboration with Ernest Denis
- Germany Above All (1915)

Published posthumously

- Education and Sociology (1922)
- Sociology and Philosophy (1924)
- Moral Education (1925)
- Socialism (1928)
- Pragmatism and Sociology (1955)
