= The Rules of Sociological Method =

1895 book by Emile Durkheim

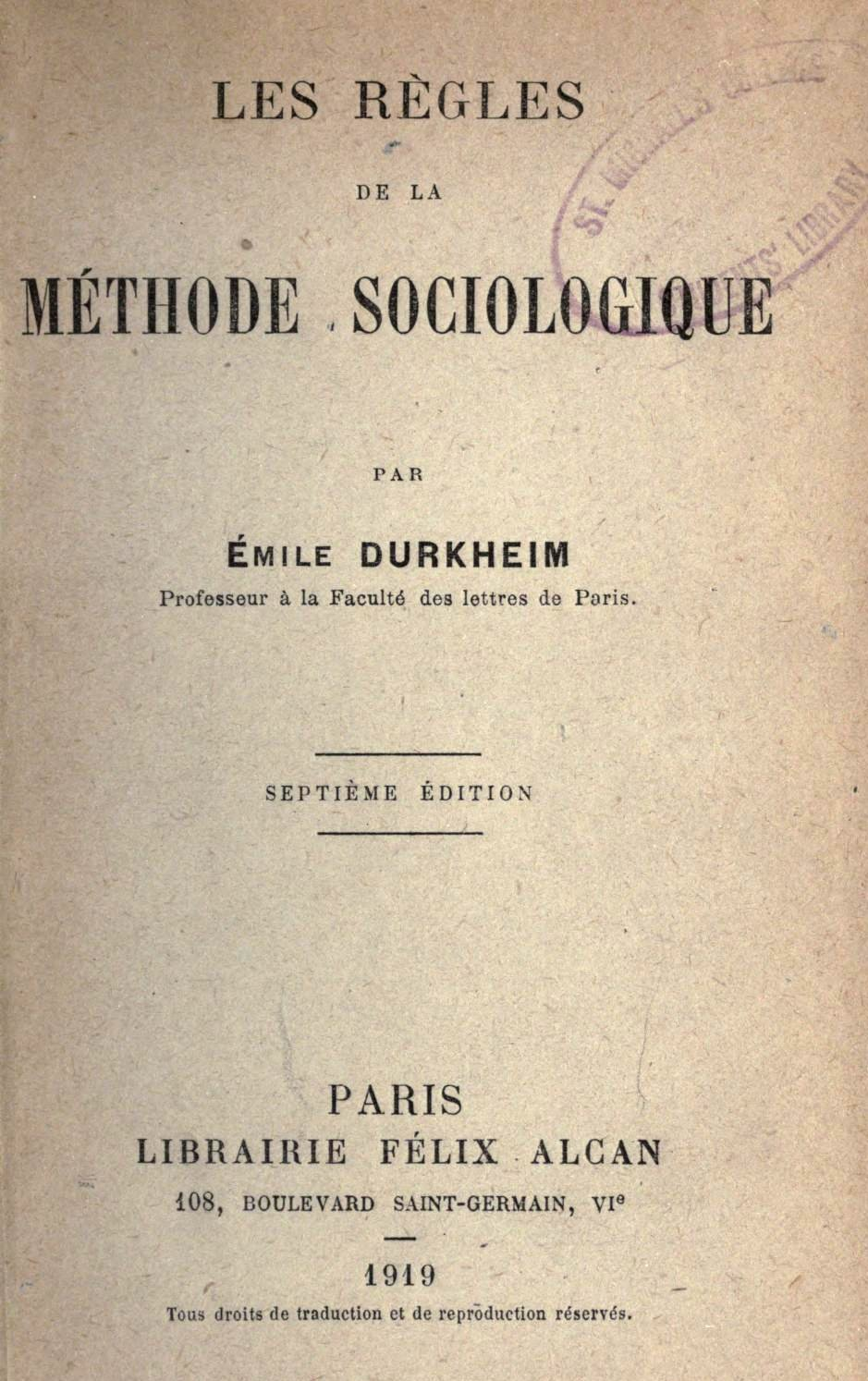
- Cover of the 1919 French edition
- Author: Émile Durkheim
- Original title: Les Règles de la méthode sociologique
- Language: French
- Subject: Sociology
- Publication date: 1895
- Publication place: France
- Media type: Print
- Original text: Les Règles de la méthode sociologique at French Wikisource

The Rules of Sociological Method (French: Les Règles de la méthode sociologique) is a book by Émile Durkheim, first published in 1895. It is recognized as being the direct result of Durkheim's own project of establishing sociology as a positivist social science. Durkheim is seen as one of the fathers of sociology, and this work, his manifesto of sociology. Durkheim distinguishes sociology from other sciences and justifies his rationale. Sociology is the science of social facts. Durkheim suggests two central theses, without which sociology would not be a science:

1. It must have a specific object of study. Unlike philosophy or psychology, sociology's proper object of study are social facts.
2. It must respect and apply a recognized objective scientific method, bringing it as close as possible to the other exact sciences. This method must at all cost avoid prejudice and subjective judgment.

This book was one of the defining books for the new science of sociology. Durkheim's argument that social sciences should be approached with the same rigorous scientific method as used in natural sciences was seen as revolutionary for the time.

The Rules is seen as an important text in sociology and is a popular book on sociological theory courses. The book's meaning is still being debated by sociologists.

== Sociology as the study of social facts ==
Durkheim's concern is to establish sociology as a science. Arguing for a place for sociology among other sciences, he wrote, "Sociology is, then, not an auxiliary of any other science; it is itself a distinct and autonomous science." In order for sociology to secure a place within the academic world and be recognized as a legitimate science, it must possess a clearly defined object of study, distinct from that of philosophy or psychology. Durkheim argued, “There is in every society a certain group of phenomena which may be differentiated from those studied by the other natural sciences.”

With regards to social facts, Durkheim defined them as follows:

A social fact is every way of acting, fixed or not, capable of exercising on the individual an external constraint; or again, every way of acting which is general throughout a given society, while at the same time existing in its own right independent of its individual manifestations.

One of the book's challenges is in showing how individual and seemingly chaotic decisions are in fact a result of a larger, more structured system, the pattern being held together by "social facts".

The definition of social facts illustrates the holistic paradigm in which Durkheim's social facts are defined by two main features: they are external to and coercive to individuals. They not only represent behaviour but also the rules that govern behaviour and give it meaning. Social facts have been not only accepted by, but have been adopted by society as rules to which they choose to follow. Law, language, morality and marriage are all examples of ideals formed through individual thought that have manifested into these concrete institutions which we must now abide by. Social facts can be constraining: if individuals do not do act as they dictate, they may face social penalties. The binding nature of social facts is often implicit, because the rules of society are internalized by individuals in the process of education and socialization.

Durkheim distinguished two types of social facts: normal social facts – which, within a society, occur regularly and most often – and pathological social facts – which are much less common.

== Principles of sociology ==
According to Durkheim, sociologists, without preconceptions and prejudices, must study social facts as real, objective phenomena. Durkheim wrote, "The first and most fundamental rule is: Consider social facts as things." This implies that sociology must respect and apply a recognized objective, scientific method, bringing it as close as possible to the other exact sciences. This method must at all cost avoid prejudice and subjective judgment.

Furthermore Durkheim talks about social phenomena and how they must be studied. Durkheim wrote:

Social phenomena must (…) be considered in themselves, detached from the conscious beings who form their own mental representations of them. They must be studied from the outside, as external things, because it is in this guise that they present themselves to us

== See also ==
- A General View of Positivism
- Structural functionalism

== Sources ==
- Durkheim, Émile (1895). Les Règles de la méthode sociologique (in French). Paris: Félix Alcan.
