= Henry Morselli =

Italian physician and psychical researcher

Enrico Agostino Morselli
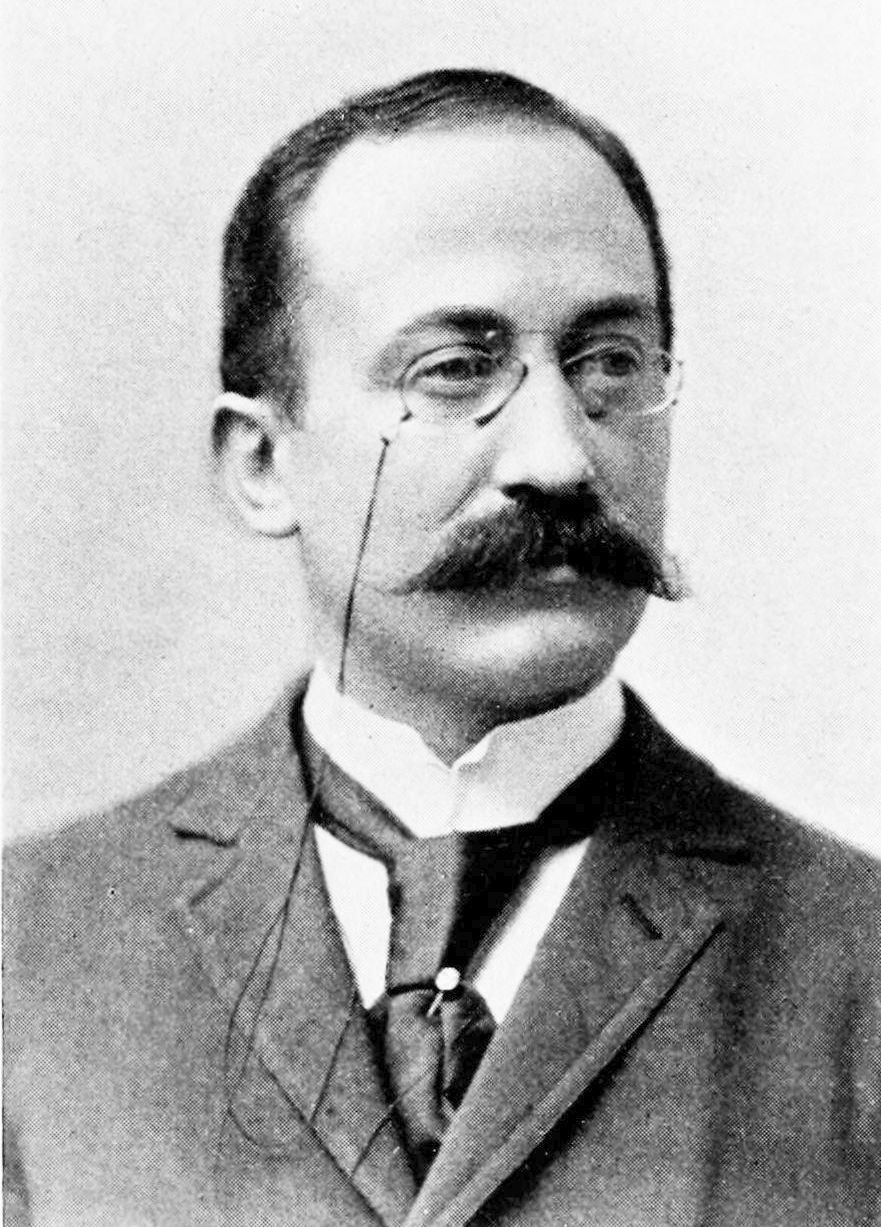
- Born: 17 July 1852; Modena
- Died: 18 February 1929 (aged 76); Genova
- Occupations: Physician, psychical researcher

Enrico Agostino Morselli (17 July 1852 – 18 February 1929) was an Italian physician and psychical researcher.

== Work ==
Morselli was a professor at the University of Turin. He is best known for the publication of his influential book Suicide: An Essay on Comparative Moral Statistics (1881) claiming that suicide was primarily the result of the struggle for life and nature's evolutionary process.

According to Edward Shorter "Morselli is known outside of Italy for having coined the term dysmorphophobia. In Italy, he is known for the psychiatry textbook A Guide to the Semiotics of Mental Illness."

Morselli was a eugenicist and some of his writings have been linked to scientific racialism. Morselli was also interested in mediumship and psychical research. He studied the medium Eusapia Palladino and concluded that some of her phenomena was genuine, being evidence for an unknown bio-psychic force present in all humans.

== Selected works ==
Science

- Suicide: An Essay on Comparative Moral Statistics (1881)
- A Guide to the Semiotics of Mental Illness (Manuale di semeiotica delle malattie mentali) (1895)

Psychical research

- Morselli, E. (1907). Eusapia Paladino and the Genuineness of Her Phenomena. Annals of Psychical Science 5: 319-360, 399-421.
- Morselli, E. (1908). Psicologia e “Spiritismo”: Impressioni e Note Critiche sui Fenomeni Medianici di Eusapia Palladino (2 vols). Turin: Fratelli Bocca.
