= Mechanical and organic solidarity =

Types of social solidarity formulated by Durkheim

In sociology, mechanical solidarity and organic solidarity are the two types of social solidarity that were formulated by Émile Durkheim, introduced in his Division of Labour in Society (1893) as part of his theory on the development of societies. According to Durkheim, the type of solidarity will correlate with the type of society, either mechanical or organic society. The two types of solidarity can be distinguished by morphological and demographic features, type of norms in existence, and the intensity and content of the conscience collective.

In a society that exhibits mechanical solidarity, its cohesion and integration comes from the homogeneity of individuals—people feel connected through similar work; educational and religious training; age; gender; and lifestyle. Mechanical solidarity normally operates in traditional and small-scale societies (e.g., tribes). In these simpler societies, solidarity is usually based on kinship ties of familial networks.

Organic solidarity is a social cohesion based upon the interdependence that arises between people from the specialization of work and complementarianism as result of more advanced (i.e., modern and industrial) societies. Although individuals perform different tasks and often have different values and interests, the order and very solidarity of society depends on their reliance on each other to perform their specified tasks. Thus, social solidarity is maintained in more complex societies through the interdependence of its component parts. Farmers, for example, produce the food that feeds the factory workers who produce the tractors that allow the farmers to produce the food.

== Features ==
Mechanical vs. organic solidarity
| Feature | === Mechanical solidarity === | === Organic solidarity === |
|---|---|---|
| ==== Morphological (structural) basis ==== | Based on resemblances (predominant in less-advanced societies); Segmental type (initially based on clan, later territorial); Little interdependence (collective consciousness is high); Relatively low volume of population; Relatively low material and moral density | Based on division of labor (predominately in more advanced societies); Organized type (fusion of markets and growth of cities); Much interdependency(collective consciousness decreases); Relatively high volume of population; Relatively high material and moral density |
| ==== Types of norms (typified by law) ==== | Rules with repressive sanctions; Prevalence of penal law | Rules with restitutive sanctions; Prevalence of cooperative law (i.e., civil, commercial, procedural, administrative, and constitutional law) |
| ==== Formal features of conscience collective ==== | High volume; High intensity; High determinateness; Collective authority is absolute | Low volume; Low intensity; Low determinateness; Greater room for individual initiative and reflection |
| ==== Content of conscience collective ==== | Highly religious; Transcendental (superior to human interests and beyond discussion); Attaching supreme value to society and interests of society as a whole; Concrete and specific | Increasingly secular; Human-orientated (concerned with human interests and open to discussion); Attaching supreme value to individual dignity, equality of opportunity, work ethic, and social justice; Abstract and general |
