= The Division of Labour in Society =

1893 book by Émile Durkheim

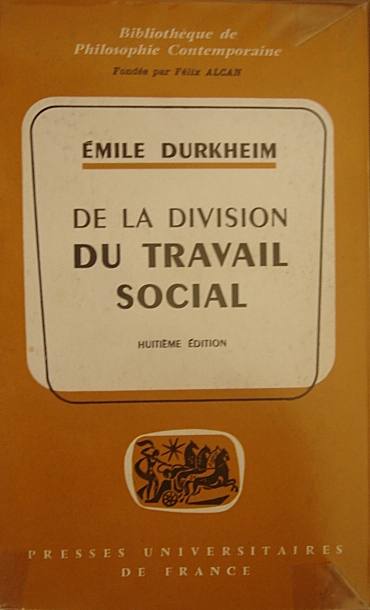
- Author: Émile Durkheim
- Publication date: 1893

The Division of Labour in Society (French: De la division du travail social) is the doctoral dissertation of the French sociologist Émile Durkheim, published in 1893. It was influential in advancing sociological theories and thought, with ideas which in turn were influenced by Auguste Comte. Durkheim described how social order was maintained in societies based on two very different forms of solidarity – mechanical and organic – and the transition from more "primitive" societies to advanced industrial societies.

Durkheim suggested that in a "primitive" society, mechanical solidarity, with people acting and thinking alike and with a shared collective conscience, is what allows social order to be maintained. In such a society, Durkheim viewed crime as an act that "offends strong and defined states of the collective conscience" though he viewed crime as a normal social fact. Because social ties are relatively homogeneous and weak throughout a mechanical society, the law has to be repressive and penal to respond to offences of the common conscience.

In an advanced, industrial, capitalist society, the complex system of division of labour means that people are allocated in society according to merit and rewarded accordingly: social inequality reflects natural inequality, at least in the case that there is complete equity in the society. Durkheim argued that moral regulation was needed, as well as economic regulation, to maintain order (or organic solidarity) in society. In fact this regulation forms naturally in response to the division of labor, allowing people to "compose their differences peaceably". In this type of society, law would be more restitutive than penal, seeking to restore rather than punish excessively.

He thought that transition of a society from "primitive" to advanced may bring about major disorder, crisis, and anomie. However, once society has reached the "advanced" stage, it becomes much stronger and is done developing. Unlike Karl Marx, Durkheim did not foresee any different society arising out of the industrial capitalist division of labour. He regarded conflict, chaos, and disorder as pathological phenomena to modern society, whereas Marx highlights class conflict.
