= Sociology of conflict =

Sociology of conflict may refer to:

- Conflict theory
- Social conflict
- Social conflict theory
- Sociology of peace, war, and social conflict
