= Sociology of terrorism =

Academic field that seeks to understand terrorism

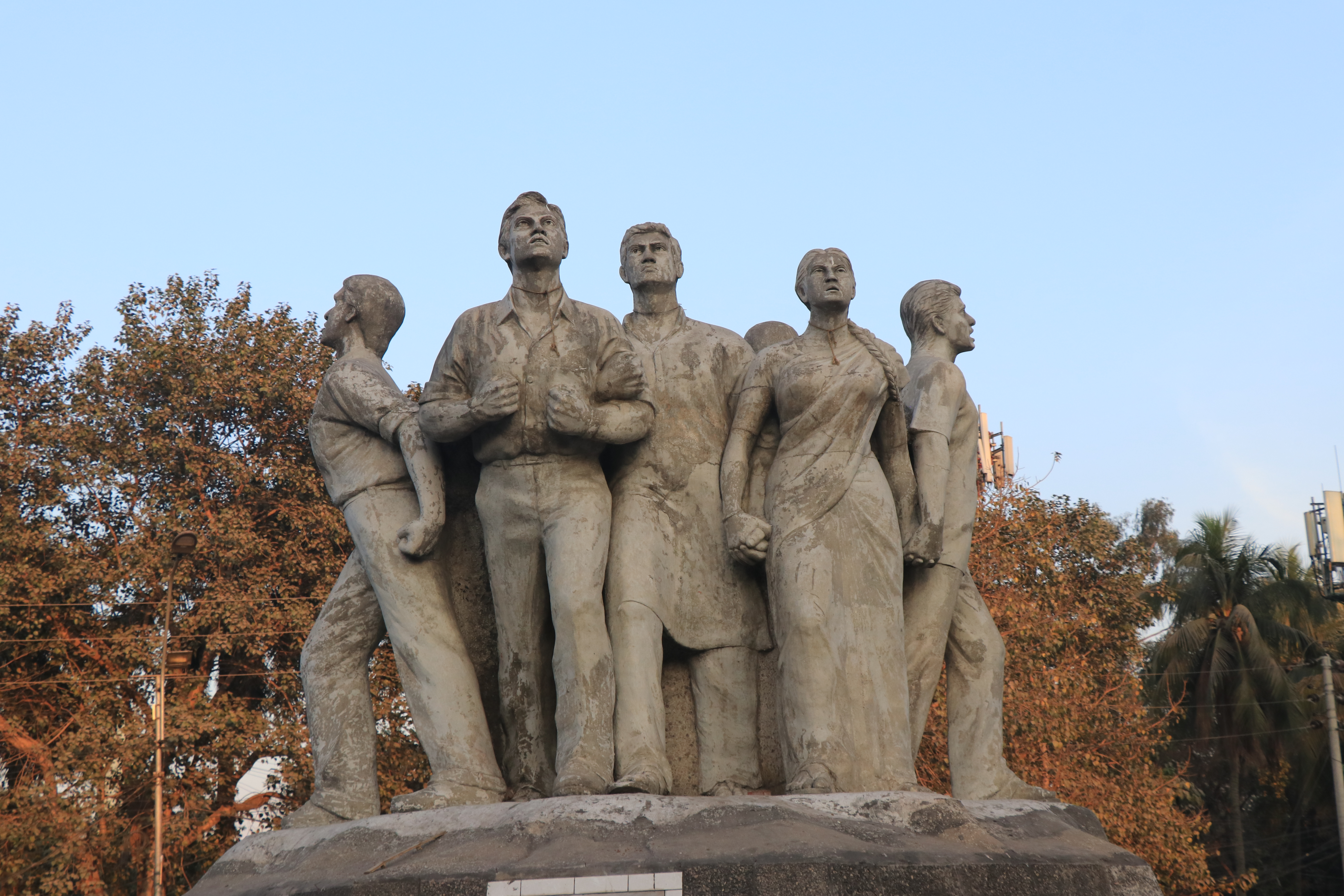
Anti Terrorism Raju Memorial Sculpture, University of Dhaka, Bangladesh.

Sociology of terrorism is a field of sociology that seeks to understand terrorism as a social phenomenon. The field studies terrorism, why it happens, and looks at its impacts on society. The sociology of terrorism draws from the fields of political science, history, economics and psychology. The sociology of terrorism differs from critical terrorism studies, emphasizing the social conditions that enable terrorism. It also studies how individuals, as well as states, respond to such events.

== Concept ==
Sociology of terrorism views terrorism as a "social construction." Within this field, defining terrorism involves interpreting events and determining causes. This definition process and the resulting presentation to the public can manipulate public perceptions and promote certain interests. The field analyzes how people are motivated to engage in collective acts of violence for political change. The field states that this type of violence, as a social behavior, relies on communication, shared and competing norms and values, and levels of social and self-restraints. Terrorists are seen to have emerged from societies where radical norms and values proved more influential. The sociological inquiry into these issues is approached on the basis of disciplinary insights in theoretical, methodological, and thematic respects.

== History ==
=== Pre-September 11 attacks ===
After the September 11 attacks, researchers became more interested in various sociological traditions related to terrorism, like moral panic, organizational response and media coverage, and counter-terrorism.

The most comprehensive study on the definition of terrorism comes from Weinberg, Pedahzur and Hirsch-Hoefler (2004) who examined 73 definitions of terrorism from 55 articles and concluded that terrorism is "a politically motivated tactic involving the threat or use of force or violence in which the pursuit of publicity plays a significant role." However, they point out that definitions of terrorism often ignore symbolic aspects of terrorism. Sociology has a unique vantage point to assess terror due to its focus on symbolism.

=== Post-September 11 attacks ===
Since the September 11 attacks, Mathieu Deflem (University of South Carolina), S. E. Costanza (Central Connecticut State University) and John C. Kilburn Jr. (Texas A&M International University) are among the sociologists to call for the development of a sub-field in sociology related to terrorism. Common topics that are part of the discourse in the sociology of terrorism include: military spending, counter-terrorism, immigration, privacy issues, and the Israeli–Palestinian conflict, where within these contexts questions of power, the definition of terrorism, propaganda, nationality, the media, etc. are being deliberated upon. Also, an imputed link between religion and terrorism became another hot topic among sociologists and social psychologists.

== Methods of Study ==
Researchers have proposed different focus areas to guide the sociological study of terrorism. Much terrorism research focuses on preventing and reacting to terrorism events. Turk and Tosini highlight the importance of defining terrorism. Turk explains that how parties define terrorism impacts a public's understanding of terrorism. It is an intentional choice when a government chooses to call a group a terrorist group. Who is defining terrorism and how they define it is a major focus area in the sociology of terrorism.

Researchers can also study terrorism as communication and socialization. Terrorism as communication focuses on terrorism as an indicator. A group or individual is communicating frustration with policy or an aspect of society. Other researchers focus on how terrorists are socialized. Researchers look to understand the conditions that lead people to opt for terrorist acts.

In the research, whether terrorism is the independent or dependent variable influences the study. Terrorism is often a dependent variable in hypotheses. Researchers look to see what causes terrorism. Young and Gurr argue that it is valuable to make terrorism the independent variable. Terrorism as an independent variable focuses on how the presence and acts of terrorism impact society.

== Recent Research in the Field ==
=== The Public and Terrorism ===
How society reacts to and understands terrorism is a core research question in the sociology of terrorism. In their article How the Public Defines Terrorism, Huff and Kertzer conducted a conjoint experiment to understand what influences an individual to define an event as terrorism. They found that the type of act (i.e. shooting, bomb), casualties, and background information on the actor had significant influence. Background information included religion, nationality, or politics and the motivation for the act. Huff and Kertzer argue that the media and public figures control the type of background information provided to the public. This "media and elite framing effect" may influence public perceptions of terrorism.

=== Policing and Citizens ===
Early peer-reviewed literature after the September 11 attacks examined policing and citizen responses to terror during the September 11 attacks. It also examined interactions between first responders (police, rescue teams, etc.) and communities. Ramirez, Hoopes and Quinlan (2003) rightly predicted that police organizations would change fundamental styles of profiling people, and police agencies would alter their mission statements after the September 11 attacks. There is strong reason to believe that even the smallest of local police agencies are apt to feel some kind of pressure to deal with the issue of terrorism.

Some sociologists and legal scholars have contemplated the potential consequences of aggressive (or militaristic) policing of terror threats that may have negative implications for human rights which are of great interest to sociologists as a matter of social justice. For instance, in a peer-reviewed article Crouching tiger or phantom dragon? Examining the discourse on global cyber-terror, Helms, Costanza and Johnson (2011) ask if it is possible that media hype at the national level could prompt an unnecessary and systemic over-pursuit of cyberterrorism. They warn that such overreaction might lead to a "killswitch" policy which could give the federal government ultimate power over the internet.

=== Moral Panic ===
More recent work in the sociology of terrorism field is philosophical and reflective and has focused on issues such as moral panic and over-spending after the September 11 attacks. Costanza and Kilburn (2005), in an article entitled Symbolic Security, Moral Panic and Public Sentiment: Toward a sociology of Counterterrorism argued that the issue of symbolism is of much importance to understanding the war on terror. Using a classic symbolic interactionist perspective, they argue that strong public sentiment about the homeland security issue has driven policy more to superficial threats than real and concrete threats. Others argue that symbolism has led to agency a policy of "hypervigilance" in agency decision-making that is costly and untestable.

=== Assessing Homeland Security Measures ===
Despite the quantitative lean of modern sociology; Kilburn, Costanza, Metchik and Borgeson (2011) point out that there are several methodological barbs to effectively and scientifically assessing the effect of homeland security measures. In traditional criminology, the most quantitatively amenable starting point for measuring the effectiveness of any policing strategy (i.e., neighborhood watch, gun control, foot patrols, etc.) is to assess total financial costs against clearance rates or arrest rates. Since terrorism is such a rare event phenomena, measuring arrests would be a naive way to test policy effectiveness.

Another methodological problem in the development of sociology of terrorism as a sub-field is one of finding operational measures for key concepts in the study of homeland security. Both terrorism and homeland security are relatively new concepts for social scientists, and academicians have yet to agree on the matter of how to properly conceptualize these ideas.

== Three sociological perspectives ==
=== Structural functionalism ===
Functionalism is "the theory that various social institutions and processes in society exists to serve some important (or necessary) function to keep society running." This sociological perspective draws on the work of sociologists like Émile Durkheim, and gets its name from the idea that the best way to study society is to identify the roles that different aspects of society play. Social deviance, loosely understood, can be taken to mean any "transgression of socially established norms." This can range from the minor–slamming a door in someone's face–to the major–a terrorist act. Thus terrorism is a deviant behavior. Functionalism sees terrorism–which is a form of crime–as a temporary deviation from the normal goings on of society, and is in a way functional to society.

A sociologist that utilizes structural functionalism would explain the existence of any social phenomena by the function they perform. Therefore, terrorism is functional because it joins individuals together in opposition, and brings a sense of belonging to the group opposing it. This feeling of group solidarity would help prevent anomie, which is the stage where people do not need to follow any norms of society in order to survive in society.

Theories by Talcott Parsons have also shaped thinking within structural functionalism. Such is the case of one of his students named N. Luhmanns. In Luhmanns' Social System theory, for example, modern society is a textbook example of a functionality differentiated society which has many distinctive sub-systems - which functionally evolved compared to previous historical less differentiated societies (Hunting and Gathering, Agricultural, Horticultural, Pastoral Societies etc.), that were often much smaller and more traditionally based or operated under mechanical forms of social solidarity according to Emile Durkheim. Luhmann carefully describes this evolution of system differentiation in one of his published articles that highlights these three different kinds of differentiation including (1) Segmentation (which is based on "equal-subsystems" and resembles a form of village or settlement in which the environmental conditions themselves are the sources of inequality, but not yet the whole structure of society. (2) Stratification, on the other hand, is clearly made up of "unequal sub-system" or inequality that is based on either rank or status in a stratified system of hierarchy. A good example of a stratified system is feudal society during the Middle Ages in Europe. (3) Functional differentiation, on the other hand, is the most differentiated and the most advanced. An example here is modern advanced industrial societies that have reached social complexity and numerous sub-systems which still multiple and expand compared to the capacities available to both stratified and segmented societies.

Another earlier classical use of functional analysis can also be found when applying Emile Durkheims' classic book on The Division of Labor. In it, the earliest and simplified societies were characterized as being based on mechanical solidarity and ascribed status orientation – whereas, modern societies were based on organic solidarity and achieved status orientation. This rapid transition from mechanical solidarity towards organic solidarity is often seen as something negative among more traditional/ fundamentalist sub-groups who preferred an ascribed oriented (religion, class, race, sex segregated) over an achieved status (individual, merit, performance,) oriented society based on organic solidarity. In short, examples might be forms of religious fundamentalism and the emergence of violent terrorist groups e.g., Boko Haram, ISIS, which are examples of anti-modern counter-movements being unable to fit in this functionally differentiated society which brings about more social complexity, secularization, and individualization. For example, the terrorist group located in Nigeria known as Boko Haram believes girls should not be permitted to go to school and should be forced into a fixed ascribed status rather than an open/achieved status oriented society where all have the same opportunity to school and achieve success regardless of their gender.

=== Example: Terrorism as egoistic, altruistic or anomic suicidal homicides ===
An example of utilizing a functionalist (or Emile Durkheim's) approach towards explaining the social phenomenon of modern terrorism is sometimes made by going back to Durkheims' original study of suicide in France, and applying the different types of suicide types (Egoistic, Altruistic, Anomic) to similar forms of suicidal terrorism types. A modern example of Durheimian's ideas is seen in a chapter by sociologist Mahmoud Sadri. He applies Durkheim's types of suicide - egoistic, altruistic, or anomic - to suicidal homicides, looking at how often the occur in both Western and non-Western cultures. According to the Chapter written by Mahmoud Sadri, in western and non-western cultures, egoistic suicidal homicides often resemble suicide pacts or simple murder suicides, whereas altruistic suicidal homicides which are found in western and non-western cultures might consist of suicide missions, ideological suicide missions, or acts of Terrorism (such as Kamikaze attacks). Finally, anomic suicidal homicides also frequently produce acts of terrorism in both western and non-westerns cultures and likely involve mass suicide pacts or mass murder suicides (in Western cultures, for example, Columbine Murders, Heaven's Gate, Jonestown or Branch Davidian mass suicides, while in non-Western cultures, for example, PKK.

Terrorists, like other criminals, become a reference point - something people use to judge or evaluate others. The norms and rules of society become clearer, and are seen as necessary, in comparison to terrorism. In order to protect the status quo, society uses terrorism as a way to reassert the importance of social norms in the lives of individuals. Thus individuals see terrorism as a threat to the social equilibrium and their life in a functioning society. Functionalists believe that social change is required to keep a healthy society. Slow, well-planned, and evolutionary method-types change a healthy society socially. These social changes often come about from a drastic need for change and are preceded by a social shock. Terrorism might be seen as bringing about a social shock that moves society towards a change in direction that enables it to find new ways in which to protect itself however this tenant is faulty since by its very name, terrorism inspires more fear and retrogression, than progressive development or stability.

=== Conflict theory ===
Conflict theory is "the idea that conflict between competing interests is the basic, animating force of social change and society in general." A conflict theorist generally sees that the control of conflict equals the ability of one group to suppress the group that they are opposing, and that civil law is a technique of defining and maintaining a social order that benefits some at the expense of others.

Conflict theorists view terrorism as a reaction to injustice, which is probably created in the minds of terrorists due to misguidance, illiteracy, or unrealistic goals, and that violent behaviors expressed by terrorist organizations are the result of individual frustration, aggression or showing a readiness to fight. The majority of terrorist acts are committed by people that are religious. In 83% of the suicide attackers worldwide, between 1980 and 2003, 43% were identifiably religious.

Terrorists use violence because they believe that if they did not use violence they would lose a power struggle, which lead many conflict theorists to view it as a weapon of the weak. In Iraq, between March 2003 and February 2006, 443 suicide missions took place with 71% belonging to al-Qaeda. They justified their actions in religious terms; viewing the Shi'a control of Iraq as abandoning religious principles. Terror establishments of Pakistan have been formally used by the state since its inception. This exemplifies that terrorism cannot be simply explained as disoriented groups seeking to express or win over certain rights from a state, as it is the state which itself who funds and supports such groups in international terrorism activism. Suicide attacks against the Iraqi regime and its American and British supporters were seen as the means in which to accomplish this. Yet it was only under certain political conditions that suicide bombings spiked. The first condition being that it was in relation with the counterinsurgency of the American and British militaries. The second being a strategic response to the Shi'a control becoming more stabilized in Iraq. Terrorists do not have the money or the political power that is needed to wage war, so they use terrorism as a means, not a goal, to agitate the government in order to achieve their political objectives. Before committing an act of terror, a terrorist does not always weigh the cost and benefits of their actions on others, but seek some benefit for themselves in an afterlife or their community.

=== Symbolic interactionism ===
Symbolic interactionism is "a micro-level theory in which shared meanings, originations, and assumptions form the basic motivations behind peoples' actions." In symbolic interactionism, face-to-face interaction creates the social world. Individuals act on perceived meanings that appear to be self-constituting. Group membership is one of the major determinations if individual interpretations of reality, which enables symbolic interactionism to explain crime, and thus terrorism. Especially terrorist identity formation - as a socialization process - is frequently studied through the lenses of social identity theory, identity theory, personal identity theory.

Deviance, which terrorism falls under, can be explained by labeling theory. Labeling theory is "the belief that individuals subconsciously notice how others see or label them, and their reactions to those labels, over time, form the basis of their self-identity." Social groups create rules about what is acceptable behavior for people in society. When a rule is broken, society determines if the act was deviant. A person can only become deviant after a social reaction to an act committed is labeled deviant, and that original act is referred to as the primary deviance. Being labeled deviant causes a person to see themselves as deviants, which leads to said person performing more deviant acts, with each act being referred to as secondary deviance. Secondary deviance can quickly turn into a stigma, which is a label that changes the way people see someone, and how individuals view themselves. According to symbolic interactionism, terrorism is treated as learned behaviors. Each person learns how to commit terrorism through interactions with terrorists. Involvement in the group is important in the learning process, and members, upon joining, are resocialized to the group's version of reality. The best way to accomplish this is to involve new members in terrorist acts, which leads the terrorist organization to become the only reference point for its members.

Social learning theory plays a part in the socialization of terroristic behaviors. Learning theory states that a person becomes deviant because of an abundance of definitions that favor deviant behavior versus definitions that are unfavorable to such behaviors. This theory is broken down into four learning mechanisms: differential association, definitions, differential reinforcement, and imitation.

The first learning mechanism is differential association, which refers to "direct association and interaction with others who engage in certain kinds of behaviors or express norms, values, and attitudes supportive of such behavior, as well as indirect association and identification with more distant reference groups." The groups that an individual are differentially associated with provides the context in which the social learning is operated. The greater the priority, intensity, duration, and frequency of the differential association the greater the effect on behavior. Hence, the theory in relation to terrorism is that the stronger someone's connection is towards a terrorist organization the better chance that person has of also exhibiting terroristic behaviors.

The second learning mechanism is definitions. Definitions refer to an "individual's own value and belief system about what is and is not acceptable behavior." These values are learned and reinforced through differential association. There are two types of definitions, general definition and specific definition. General definitions include broad beliefs about conformity that are influenced through conventional means and are often influenced by religious or moral values. Specific definitions are seen as those that align an individual with particular acts of crime. The greater the number of definitions the more likely a person will engage in criminal behavior. So the more definitions an individual has that favor terroristic behavior the greater chance that person has of committing a terroristic acts.

The third learning mechanism is differential reinforcement. Differential reinforcement "refers to the balance of anticipated or actual rewards and punishments that follow behavior." An individual refraining from committing a crime depends on a balance of past, present, and anticipated future rewards or punishments for their actions. In regards to terrorism, the more direct or indirect social interaction a person has towards terrorism the more likely they are to commit a terroristic act.

The fourth and final learning mechanism is imitation. "Imitation is the notion that individuals engage in behaviors that they have previously witnessed others doing." The characters being observed, the behaviors that are being witnessed, and the consequences for those behaviors determine how much an individual imitates a behavior. All of these things need to fall into place in order for an individual to imitate a terrorist.

== See also ==
- Sociology of conflict
- Sociology of peace, war, and social conflict
- Critical Terrorism Studies
- Staircase model
