= Conflict theories =

Perspectives in sociology and political philosophy

Conflict theories are perspectives in political philosophy and sociology which argue that individuals and groups (social classes) within society interact on the basis of conflict rather than agreement, while also emphasizing social psychology, historical materialism, power dynamics, and their roles in creating power structures, social movements, and social arrangements within a society. Conflict theories often draw attention to power differentials, such as class conflict, or a conflict continuum. Power generally contrasts historically dominant ideologies, economies, currencies or technologies. Accordingly, conflict theories represent attempts at the macro-level analysis of society.

Many political philosophers and sociologists have been framed as having conflict theories, dating back as far as Plato's idea of the tripartite soul of The Republic, to Hobbes' ideas in The Leviathan. Other historical political philosophers associated with having "conflict theories" include Jean Bodin, Adam Smith, John Stuart Mill, Thomas Robert Malthus, Karl Marx, and Georg Simmel. Georg Simmel was one of the earliest sociologists to formally use "conflict" as a framework to understand social change, writing about the topic in his 1908 book, "Conflict and the Web of Group Affiliations".

While many conflict theories set out to highlight the ideological aspects inherent in traditional thought, conflict theory does not refer to a unified school of thought, and should not be confused with, for instance, social conflict theory, or any other specific theory related to social conflict.

== In classical conflict theory ==
Two early conflict theorists were the Polish-Austrian sociologist and political theorist Ludwig Gumplowicz (1838–1909) and the American sociologist and paleontologist Lester F. Ward (1841–1913). Although Ward and Gumplowicz developed their theories independently they had much in common and approached conflict from a comprehensive anthropological and evolutionary point-of-view as opposed to Marx's rather exclusive focus on economic factors.

Gumplowicz, in Grundriss der Soziologie (Outlines of Sociology, 1884), describes how civilization has been shaped by conflict between cultures and ethnic groups. Gumplowicz theorized that large complex human societies evolved from war and conquest. The winner of a war would enslave the losers; eventually a complex caste system develops. Horowitz says that Gumplowicz understood conflict in all its forms: "class conflict, race conflict, and ethnic conflict", and calls him one of the fathers of conflict theory.

What happened in India, Babylon, Egypt, Greece, and Rome may sometimes happen in modern Europe. European civilization may perish, over flooded by barbaric tribes. But if anyone believes that we are safe from such catastrophes he is perhaps yielding to an all too optimistic delusion. There are no barbaric tribes in our neighborhood to be sure — but let no one is deceived, their instincts lie latent in the populace of European states.

— Gumplowicz (1884),

Conflict theories were popular in early sociology, and accordingly often date back to the early 1900s founders of Sociology, and particularly the ideas of Max Weber, Georg Simmel, Karl Marx, and Lester Frank Ward.

Émile Durkheim (1858–1917) opposed conflict theory views and instead saw society as a functioning organism. His primary lens of functionalism concerns "the effort to impute, as rigorously as possible, to each feature, custom, or practice, its effect on the functioning of a supposedly stable, cohesive system," Seeing social conflict as a dysfunction that appeared in society as crime. Durkheim saw crime as "a factor in public health, an integral part of all healthy societies." The collective conscience defines certain acts as "criminal." Crime thus plays a role in the evolution of morality and law: "[it] implies not only that the way remains open to necessary changes but that in certain cases it directly prepares these changes."

Max Weber's (1864–1920) approach to conflict is contrasted with that of Marx. While Marx focused on the way individual behavior is conditioned by social structure, Weber emphasized the importance of "social action," i.e., the ability of individuals to affect their social relationships.

Karl Marx (1818–1883) based his conflict theory on a dialectical materialist account of history. Marxism posited that capitalism, like previous socioeconomic systems, would inevitably produce internal tensions leading to its own destruction. Marx ushered in radical change, advocating proletarian revolution and freedom from the ruling classes, as well as critiqued political economy. At the same time, Karl Marx was aware that most people living in capitalist societies did not see how the system shaped the entire operation of society. Just as modern individuals see private property (and the right to pass that property on to their children) as natural, many of the members in capitalistic societies see the rich as having earned their wealth through hard work and education, while seeing the poor as lacking skill and initiative. Marx rejected this type of thinking, viewing it as something Friedrich Engels termed false consciousness, the use of misdirection by the ruling class to obfuscate the exploitation intrinsic to the relationship between the proletariat and the ruling class. Marx wanted to replace this false consciousness with what Friedrich Engels termed class consciousness, the workers' recognition of themselves as a class unified in opposition to capitalists and ultimately to the capitalist system itself. In general, Marx wanted the proletarians to rise up against the capitalists and overthrow the capitalist system.

The history of all hitherto existing society is the history of class struggles. Freeman and slave, patrician and plebeian, lord and serf, guild-master and journeyman, in a word, oppressor and oppressed, stood in constant opposition to one another, carried on an uninterrupted, now hidden, now open fight, a fight that each time ended, either in a revolutionary reconstitution of society at large or in the common ruin of the contending classes.

— Karl Marx & Friedrich Engels The Communist Manifesto 1848,

Lester Frank Ward directly attacked and attempted to systematically refute the elite business class' laissez-faire philosophy as espoused by the hugely popular social philosopher Herbert Spencer. Ward's Dynamic Sociology (1883) was an extended thesis on how to reduce conflict and competition in society and thus optimize human progress. At the most basic level, Ward saw human nature itself to be deeply conflicted between self-aggrandizement and altruism, between emotion and intellect, and between male and female. These conflicts would be then reflected in society and Ward assumed there had been a "perpetual and vigorous struggle" among various "social forces" that shaped civilization. Ward was more optimistic than Marx and Gumplowicz and believed that it was possible to build on and reform present social structures with the help of sociological analysis.

== Modern approaches ==
C. Wright Mills has been called the founder of modern conflict theory. In Mills's view, social structures are created through conflict between people with differing interests and resources. Individuals and resources, in turn, are influenced by these structures and by the "unequal distribution of power and resources in the society." The power elite of American society, (i.e., the military–industrial complex) had "emerged from the fusion of the corporate elite, the Pentagon, and the executive branch of government." Mills argued that the interests of this elite were opposed to those of the people. He theorized that the policies of the power elite would result in "increased escalation of conflict, production of weapons of mass destruction, and possibly the annihilation of the human race."

Gene Sharp (1928-2018) was a professor emeritus of political science at the University of Massachusetts Dartmouth. He is known for his extensive writings on nonviolent struggle, which have influenced numerous anti-government resistance movements around the world. In 1983 he founded the Albert Einstein Institution, a non-profit organization devoted to studies and promotion of the use of nonviolent action in conflicts worldwide. Sharp's key theme is that power is not monolithic; that is, it does not derive from some intrinsic quality of those who are in power. For Sharp, political power, the power of any state—regardless of its particular structural organization—ultimately derives from the subjects of the state. His fundamental belief is that any power structure relies upon the subjects' obedience to the orders of the ruler or rulers. If subjects do not obey, leaders have no power. Sharp has been called both the "Machiavelli of nonviolence" and the "Clausewitz of nonviolent warfare." Sharp's scholarship has influenced resistance organizations around the world. More recently, the protest movement that toppled President Mubarak of Egypt drew extensively on his ideas, as well as the youth movement in Tunisia, and the earlier ones in the Eastern European colour revolutions that had previously been inspired by Sharp's work.

A recent articulation of conflict theory is found in Canadian sociologist Alan Sears' book A Good Book, in Theory: A Guide to Theoretical Thinking (2008):

- Societies are defined by inequality that produces conflict, rather than which produces order and consensus. This conflict based on inequality can only be overcome through a fundamental transformation of the existing relations in the society, and is productive of new social relations.
- The disadvantaged have structural interests that run counter to the status quo, which, once they are assumed, will lead to social change. Thus, they are viewed as agents of change rather than objects one should feel sympathy for.
- Human potential (e.g., capacity for creativity) is suppressed by conditions of exploitation and oppression, which are necessary in any society with an unequal division of labour. These and other qualities do not necessarily have to be stunted due to the requirements of the so-called "civilizing process," or "functional necessity": creativity is actually an engine for economic development and change.
- The role of theory is in realizing human potential and transforming society, rather than maintaining the power structure. The opposite aim of theory would be the objectivity and detachment associated with positivism, where theory is a neutral, explanatory tool.
- Consensus is a euphemism for ideology. Genuine consensus is not achieved, rather the more powerful in societies are able to impose their conceptions on others and have them accept their discourses. Consensus does not preserve social order, it entrenches stratification, a tool of the current social order.
- The State serves the particular interests of the most powerful while claiming to represent the interests of all. Representation of disadvantaged groups in State processes may cultivate the notion of full participation, but this is an illusion/ideology.
- Inequality on a global level is characterized by the purposeful underdevelopment of Third World countries, both during colonization and after national independence. The global system (i.e., development agencies such as World Bank and International Monetary Fund) benefits the most powerful countries and multi-national corporations, rather than the subjects of development, through economic, political, and military actions.

Although Sears associates the conflict theory approach with Marxism, he argues that it is the foundation for much "feminist, post-modernist, anti-racist, and lesbian-gay liberationist theories."

Conflict theory has three assumptions:

- Humans are self-interested.
- Societies operate under perpetual scarcity of resources.
- Conflict is pervasive and unavoidable within social groups and between social groups.

== Types ==
Conflict theory is most commonly associated with Marxism, but as a reaction to functionalism and the positivist method, it may also be associated with a number of other perspectives, including:

- Critical theory
- Feminist theory: An approach that recognizes women's political, social, and economic equality to men.
- Postmodern theory: An approach that is critical of modernism, with a mistrust of grand theories and ideologies.
- Post-structural theory
- Postcolonial theory
- Queer theory: A growing body of research findings that challenges the heterosexual bias in Western society.
- World systems theory
- Race-conflict approach: A point of view that focuses on inequality and conflict between people of different racial and ethnic categories.
- Critical realism (philosophy of the social sciences)
- Realistic Conflict Theory

== Criticism ==
Conflict theory has been criticised for being too politicised by its association with Marx and its widespread use by advocates in numerous causes and movements. Critics also argue it downplays unity in society while taking a negative view of society.

== See also ==
- Conflict management
- Game theory
- One-upmanship
- Pure sociology
- Redlining
- Security dilemma
- Social defeat
- Sociology of peace, war, and social conflict
- Socionics
