= Structural functionalism =

Sociological theory of society

Structural functionalism, or simply functionalism, is "a framework for building theory that sees society as a complex system whose parts work together to promote solidarity and stability".

This approach looks at society through a macro-level orientation, which is a broad focus on the social structures that shape society as a whole, and believes that society has evolved like organisms. This approach looks at both social structure and social functions. Functionalism addresses society as a whole in terms of the function of its constituent elements; namely norms, customs, traditions, and institutions.

A common analogy called the organic or biological analogy, popularized by Herbert Spencer, presents these parts of society as human body "organs" that work toward the proper functioning of the "body" as a whole. In the most basic terms, it simply emphasizes "the effort to impute, as rigorously as possible, to each feature, custom, or practice, its effect on the functioning of a supposedly stable, cohesive system". For Talcott Parsons, "structural-functionalism" came to describe a particular stage in the methodological development of social science, rather than a specific school of thought.

== Theory ==
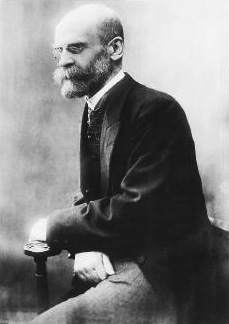
Émile Durkheim

In sociology, classical theories are defined by a tendency towards biological analogy and notions of social evolutionism:

Functionalist thought, from Comte onwards, has looked particularly towards biology as the science providing the closest and most compatible model for social science. Biology has been taken to provide a guide to conceptualizing the structure and function of social systems and analyzing evolution processes via mechanisms of adaptation ... functionalism strongly emphasises the pre-eminence of the social world over its individual parts (i.e. its constituent actors, human subjects).

— Anthony Giddens, The Constitution of Society: Outline of the Theory of Structuration

While one may regard functionalism as a logical extension of the organic analogies for societies presented by political philosophers such as Rousseau, sociology draws firmer attention to those institutions unique to industrialized capitalist society (or modernity).

Auguste Comte believed that society constitutes a separate "level" of reality, distinct from both biological and inorganic matter. Explanations of social phenomena had therefore to be constructed within this level, individuals being merely transient occupants of comparatively stable social roles. In this view, Comte was followed by Émile Durkheim. A central concern for Durkheim was the question of how certain societies maintain internal stability and survive over time. He proposed that such societies tend to be segmented, with equivalent parts held together by shared values, common symbols or (as his nephew Marcel Mauss held), systems of exchanges. Durkheim used the term mechanical solidarity to refer to these types of "social bonds, based on common sentiments and shared moral values, that are strong among members of pre-industrial societies". In modern, complex societies, members perform very different and highly specialized tasks, resulting in a strong interdependence. Based on the metaphor above of an organism in which many parts function together to sustain the whole, Durkheim argued that complex societies are held together by "organic solidarity", i.e. "social bonds, based on specialization and interdependence, that are strong among members of industrial societies".

The central concern of structural functionalism may be regarded as a continuation of the Durkheimian task of explaining the apparent stability and internal cohesion needed by societies to endure over time. Societies are seen as coherent, bounded and fundamentally relational constructs that function like organisms, with their various (or social institutions) working together in an unconscious, quasi-automatic fashion toward achieving an overall social equilibrium. All social and cultural phenomena are therefore seen as functional in the sense of working together, and are effectively deemed to have "lives" of their own. They are primarily analyzed in terms of this function. The individual is significant not in and of themselves, but rather in terms of their status, their position in patterns of social relations, and the behaviours associated with their status. Therefore, the social structure is the network of statuses connected by associated roles.

Functionalism also has an anthropological basis in the work of theorists such as Marcel Mauss, Bronisław Malinowski and Radcliffe-Brown. The prefix 'structural' emerged in Radcliffe-Brown's specific usage. Radcliffe-Brown proposed that most stateless, "primitive" societies, lacking strong centralized institutions, are based on an association of corporate-descent groups, i.e. the respective society's recognised kinship groups. Structural functionalism also took on Malinowski's argument that the basic building block of society is the nuclear family, and that the clan is an outgrowth, not vice versa. It is simplistic to equate the perspective directly with political conservatism. The tendency to emphasize "cohesive systems", however, leads functionalist theories to be contrasted with "conflict theories" which instead emphasize social problems and inequalities.

== Prominent theorists ==
=== Auguste Comte ===
Auguste Comte, the "Father of Positivism", pointed out the need to keep society unified as many traditions were diminishing. He was the first person to coin the term sociology. Comte suggests that sociology is the product of a three-stage development:

1. Theological stage: From the beginning of human history until the end of the European Middle Ages, people took a religious view that society expressed God's will. In the theological state, the human mind, seeking the essential nature of beings, the first and final causes (the origin and purpose) of all effects—in short, absolute knowledge—supposes all phenomena to be produced by the immediate action of supernatural beings.
2. Metaphysical stage: People began seeing society as a natural system as opposed to the supernatural. This began with enlightenment and the ideas of Hobbes, Locke, and Rousseau. Perceptions of society reflected the failings of a selfish human nature rather than the perfection of God.
3. Positive or scientific stage: Describing society through the application of the scientific approach, which draws on the work of scientists.

=== Herbert Spencer ===
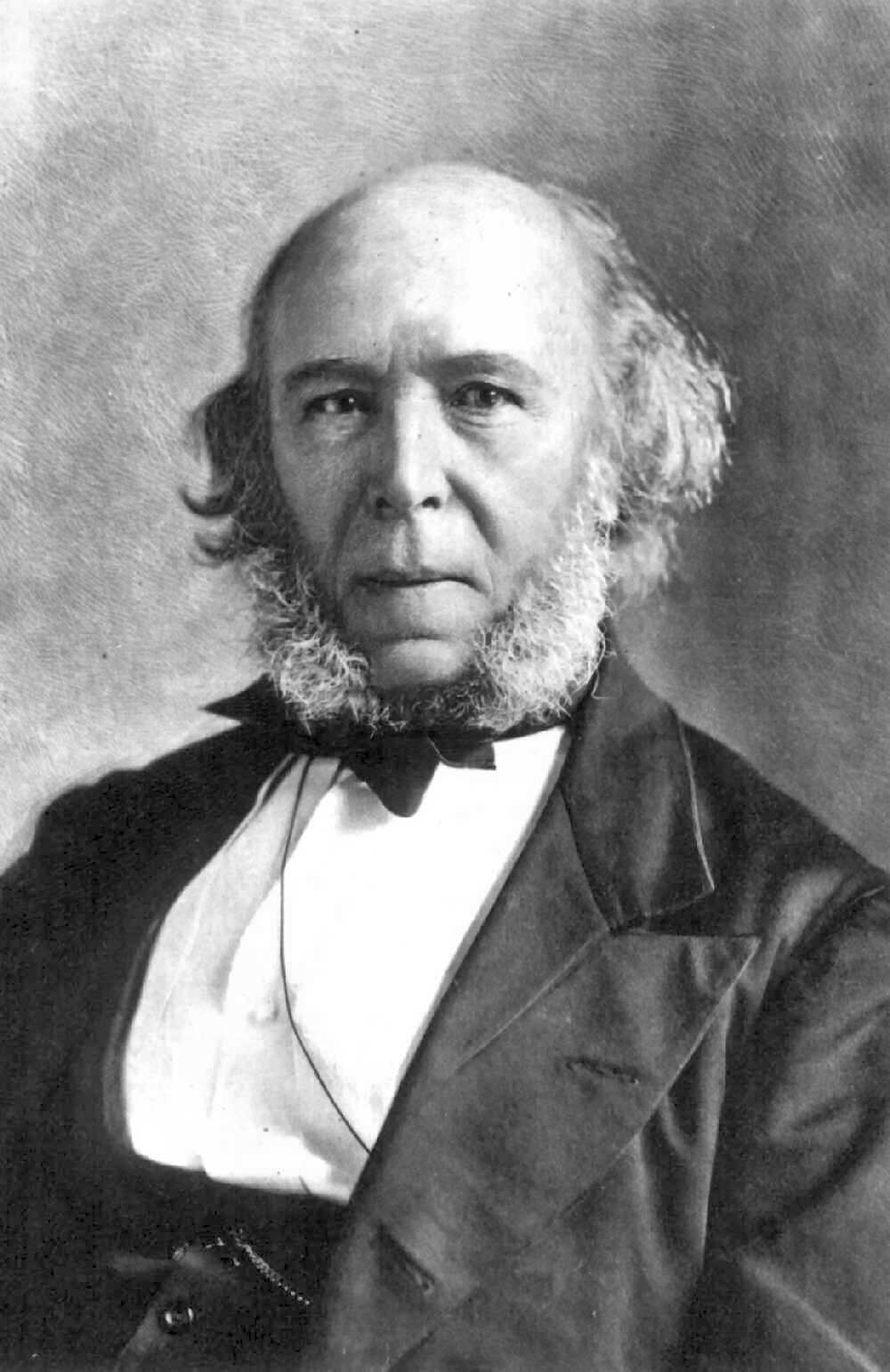
Herbert Spencer

Herbert Spencer (1820–1903) was a British philosopher famous for applying the theory of natural selection to society. He was in many ways the first true sociological functionalist. In fact, while Durkheim is widely considered the most important functionalist among positivist theorists, it is known that much of his analysis was culled from reading Spencer's work, especially his Principles of Sociology (1874–96). In describing society, Spencer alludes to the analogy of a human body. Just as the structural parts of the human body—the skeleton, muscles, and various internal organs—function independently to help the entire organism survive, social structures work together to preserve society.

This evolutionary model, unlike most 19th century evolutionary theories, is cyclical, beginning with the differentiation and increasing complication of an organic or "super-organic" (Spencer's term for a social system) body, followed by a fluctuating state of equilibrium and disequilibrium (or a state of adjustment and adaptation), and, finally, the stage of disintegration or dissolution. Following Thomas Malthus' population principles, Spencer concluded that society is constantly facing selection pressures (internal and external) that force it to adapt its internal structure through differentiation.

Every solution, however, causes a new set of selection pressures that threaten society's viability. Spencer was not a determinist in the sense that he never said that

1. Selection pressures will be felt in time to change them;
2. They will be felt and reacted to; or
3. The solutions will always work.

In fact, he was in many ways a political sociologist, and recognized that the degree of centralized and consolidated authority in a given polity could make or break its ability to adapt. In other words, he saw a general trend towards the centralization of power as leading to stagnation and ultimately, pressures to decentralize.

More specifically, Spencer recognized three functional needs or prerequisites that produce selection pressures: they are regulatory, operative (production) and distributive. He argued that all societies need to solve problems of control and coordination, production of goods, services and ideas, and, finally, to find ways of distributing these resources.

Initially, in tribal societies, these three needs are inseparable, and the kinship system is the dominant structure that satisfies them. As many scholars have noted, all institutions are subsumed under kinship organization, but, with increasing population (both in terms of sheer numbers and density), problems emerge with regard to feeding individuals, creating new forms of organization—consider the emergent division of labour—coordinating and controlling various differentiated social units, and developing systems of resource distribution.

The solution, as Spencer sees it, is to differentiate structures to fulfill more specialized functions; thus, a chief or "big man" emerges, soon followed by a group of lieutenants, and later kings and administrators. The structural parts of society (e.g. families, work) function interdependently to help society function. Therefore, social structures work together to preserve society.

=== Talcott Parsons ===
Talcott Parsons began writing in the 1930s and contributed to sociology, political science, anthropology, and psychology. Structural functionalism and Parsons have received much criticism. Numerous critics have pointed out Parsons' underemphasis of political and monetary struggle, the basics of social change, and the by and large "manipulative" conduct unregulated by qualities and standards. Structural functionalism, and a large portion of Parsons' works, appear to be insufficient in their definitions concerning the connections amongst institutionalized and non-institutionalized conduct, and the procedures by which institutionalization happens.

Parsons was heavily influenced by Durkheim and Max Weber, synthesizing much of their work into his action theory, which he based on the system-theoretical concept and the methodological principle of voluntary action. He held that "the social system is made up of the actions of individuals". His starting point, accordingly, is the interaction between two individuals faced with a variety of choices about how they might act, choices that are influenced and constrained by a number of physical and social factors.

Parsons determined that each individual has expectations of the other's action and reaction to their own behavior, and that these expectations would (if successful) be "derived" from the accepted norms and values of the society they inhabit. As Parsons himself emphasized, in a general context there would never exist any perfect "fit" between behaviors and norms, so such a relation is never complete or "perfect".

Social norms were always problematic for Parsons, who never claimed (as has often been alleged) that social norms were generally accepted and agreed upon, should this prevent some kind of universal law. Whether social norms were accepted or not was for Parsons simply a historical question.

As behaviors are repeated in more interactions, and these expectations are entrenched or institutionalized, a role is created. Parsons defines a "role" as the normatively-regulated participation "of a person in a concrete process of social interaction with specific, concrete role-partners". Although any individual, theoretically, can fulfill any role, the individual is expected to conform to the norms governing the nature of the role they fulfill.

Furthermore, one person can and does fulfill many different roles at the same time. In one sense, an individual can be seen to be a "composition" of the roles he inhabits. Certainly, today, when asked to describe themselves, most people would answer with reference to their societal roles.

Parsons later developed the idea of roles into collectivities of roles that complement each other in fulfilling functions for society. Some roles are bound up in institutions and social structures (economic, educational, legal and even gender-based). These are functional in the sense that they assist society in operating and fulfilling its functional needs so that society runs smoothly.

Contrary to prevailing myth, Parsons never spoke about a society where there was no conflict or some kind of "perfect" equilibrium. A society's cultural value-system was in the typical case never completely integrated, never static and most of the time, like in the case of the American society, in a complex state of transformation relative to its historical point of departure. To reach a "perfect" equilibrium was not any serious theoretical question in Parsons analysis of social systems, indeed, the most dynamic societies had generally cultural systems with important inner tensions like the US and India. These tensions were a source of their strength according to Parsons rather than the opposite. Parsons never thought about system-institutionalization and the level of strains (tensions, conflict) in the system as opposite forces per se.

The key processes for Parsons for system reproduction are socialization and social control. Socialization is important because it is the mechanism for transferring the accepted norms and values of society to the individuals within the system. Parsons never spoke about "perfect socialization"—in any society socialization was only partial and "incomplete" from an integral point of view.

Parsons states that "this point ... is independent of the sense in which [the] individual is concretely autonomous or creative rather than 'passive' or 'conforming', for individuality and creativity, are to a considerable extent, phenomena of the institutionalization of expectations"; they are culturally constructed.

Socialization is supported by the positive and negative sanctioning of role behaviours that do or do not meet these expectations. A punishment could be informal, like a snigger or gossip, or more formalized, through institutions such as prisons and mental homes. If these two processes were perfect, society would become static and unchanging, but in reality, this is unlikely to occur for long.

Parsons recognizes this, stating that he treats "the structure of the system as problematic and subject to change", and that his concept of the tendency towards equilibrium "does not imply the empirical dominance of stability over change". He does, however, believe that these changes occur in a relatively smooth way.

Individuals in interaction with changing situations adapt through a process of "role bargaining". Once the roles are established, they create norms that guide further action and are thus institutionalized, creating stability across social interactions. Where the adaptation process cannot adjust, due to sharp shocks or immediate radical change, structural dissolution occurs and either new structures (or therefore a new system) are formed, or society dies. This model of social change has been described as a "moving equilibrium", and emphasizes a desire for social order.

=== Davis and Moore ===
Kingsley Davis and Wilbert E. Moore (1945) gave an argument for social stratification based on the idea of "functional necessity" (also known as the Davis-Moore hypothesis). They argue that the most difficult jobs in any society have the highest incomes in order to motivate individuals to fill the roles needed by the division of labour. Thus, inequality serves social stability.

This argument has been criticized as fallacious from a number of different angles: the argument is both that the individuals who are the most deserving are the highest rewarded, and that a system of unequal rewards is necessary, otherwise no individuals would perform as needed for the society to function. The problem is that these rewards are supposed to be based upon objective merit, rather than subjective "motivations." The argument also does not clearly establish why some positions are worth more than others, even when they benefit more people in society, e.g., teachers compared to athletes and movie stars. Critics have suggested that structural inequality (inherited wealth, family power, etc.) is itself a cause of individual success or failure, not a consequence of it.

=== Robert Merton ===
Robert K. Merton made important refinements to functionalist thought. He fundamentally agreed with Parsons' theory but acknowledged that Parsons' theory could be questioned, believing that it was over generalized. Merton tended to emphasize middle range theory rather than a grand theory, meaning that he was able to deal specifically with some of the limitations in Parsons' thinking. Merton believed that any social structure probably has many functions, some more obvious than others. He identified three main limitations: functional unity, universal functionalism and indispensability. He also developed the concept of deviance and made the distinction between manifest and latent functions. Manifest functions referred to the recognized and intended consequences of any social pattern. Latent functions referred to unrecognized and unintended consequences of any social pattern.

Merton criticized functional unity, saying that not all parts of a modern complex society work for the functional unity of society. Consequently, there is a social dysfunction referred to as any social pattern that may disrupt the operation of society. Some institutions and structures may have other functions, and some may even be generally dysfunctional, or be functional for some while being dysfunctional for others. This is because not all structures are functional for society as a whole. Some practices are only functional for a dominant individual or a group.

There are two types of functions that Merton discusses the "manifest functions" in that a social pattern can trigger a recognized and intended consequence. The manifest function of education includes preparing for a career by getting good grades, graduation and finding good job. The second type of function is "latent functions", where a social pattern results in an unrecognized or unintended consequence. The latent functions of education include meeting new people, extra-curricular activities, school trips.

Another type of social function is "social dysfunction" which is any undesirable consequences that disrupts the operation of society. The social dysfunction of education includes not getting good grades, a job. Merton states that by recognizing and examining the dysfunctional aspects of society we can explain the development and persistence of alternatives. Thus, as Holmwood states, "Merton explicitly made power and conflict central issues for research within a functionalist paradigm."

Merton also noted that there may be functional alternatives to the institutions and structures currently fulfilling the functions of society. This means that the institutions that currently exist are not indispensable to society. Merton states "just as the same item may have multiple functions, so may the same function be diversely fulfilled by alternative items." This notion of functional alternatives is important because it reduces the tendency of functionalism to imply approval of the status quo.

Merton's theory of deviance is derived from Durkheim's idea of anomie. It is central in explaining how internal changes can occur in a system. For Merton, anomie means a discontinuity between cultural goals and the accepted methods available for reaching them.

Merton believes that there are 5 situations facing an actor.

- Conformity occurs when an individual has the means and desire to achieve the cultural goals socialized into them.
- Innovation occurs when an individual strives to attain the accepted cultural goals but chooses to do so in novel or unaccepted method.
- Ritualism occurs when an individual continues to do things as prescribed by society but forfeits the achievement of the goals.
- Retreatism is the rejection of both the means and the goals of society.
- Rebellion is a combination of the rejection of societal goals and means and a substitution of other goals and means.

Thus it can be seen that change can occur internally in society through either innovation or rebellion. It is true that society will attempt to control these individuals and negate the changes, but as the innovation or rebellion builds momentum, society will eventually adapt or face dissolution.

=== Almond and Powell ===
In the 1970s, political scientists Gabriel Almond and Bingham Powell introduced a structural-functionalist approach to comparing political systems. They argued that, in order to understand a political system, it is necessary to understand not only its institutions (or structures) but also their respective functions. They also insisted that these institutions, to be properly understood, must be placed in a meaningful and dynamic historical context.

This idea stood in marked contrast to prevalent approaches in the field of comparative politics—the state-society theory and the dependency theory. These were the descendants of David Easton's system theory in international relations, a mechanistic view that saw all political systems as essentially the same, subject to the same laws of "stimulus and response"—or inputs and outputs—while paying little attention to unique characteristics. The structural-functional approach is based on the view that a political system is made up of several key components, including interest groups, political parties and branches of government.

In addition to structures, Almond and Powell showed that a political system consists of various functions, chief among them political socialization, recruitment and communication: socialization refers to the way in which societies pass along their values and beliefs to succeeding generations, and in political terms describe the process by which a society inculcates civic virtues, or the habits of effective citizenship; recruitment denotes the process by which a political system generates interest, engagement and participation from citizens; and communication refers to the way that a system promulgates its values and information.

== Unilineal descent ==
In their attempt to explain the social stability of African "primitive" stateless societies where they undertook their fieldwork, Evans-Pritchard (1940) and Meyer Fortes (1945) argued that the Tallensi and the Nuer were primarily organized around unilineal descent groups. Such groups are characterized by common purposes, such as administering property or defending against attacks; they form a permanent social structure that persists well beyond the lifespan of their members. In the case of the Tallensi and the Nuer, these corporate groups were based on kinship which in turn fitted into the larger structures of unilineal descent; consequently Evans-Pritchard's and Fortes' model is called "descent theory". Moreover, in this African context territorial divisions were aligned with lineages; descent theory therefore synthesized both blood and soil as the same. Affinal ties with the parent through whom descent is not reckoned, however, are considered to be merely complementary or secondary (Fortes created the concept of "complementary filiation"), with the reckoning of kinship through descent being considered the primary organizing force of social systems. Because of its strong emphasis on unilineal descent, this new kinship theory came to be called "descent theory".

With no delay, descent theory had found its critics. Many African tribal societies seemed to fit this neat model rather well, although Africanists, such as Paul Richards, also argued that Fortes and Evans-Pritchard had deliberately downplayed internal contradictions and overemphasized the stability of the local lineage systems and their significance for the organization of society. However, in many Asian settings the problems were even more obvious. In Papua New Guinea, the local patrilineal descent groups were fragmented and contained large amounts of non-agnates. Status distinctions did not depend on descent, and genealogies were too short to account for social solidarity through identification with a common ancestor. In particular, the phenomenon of cognatic (or bilateral) kinship posed a serious problem to the proposition that descent groups are the primary element behind the social structures of "primitive" societies.

Leach's (1966) critique came in the form of the classical Malinowskian argument, pointing out that "in Evans-Pritchard's studies of the Nuer and also in Fortes's studies of the Tallensi unilineal descent turns out to be largely an ideal concept to which the empirical facts are only adapted by means of fictions". People's self-interest, manoeuvring, manipulation and competition had been ignored. Moreover, descent theory neglected the significance of marriage and affinal ties, which were emphasized by Lévi-Strauss's structural anthropology, at the expense of overemphasizing the role of descent. To quote Leach: "The evident importance attached to matrilateral and affinal kinship connections is not so much explained as explained away."

== Biological ==
Biological functionalism is an anthropological paradigm, asserting that all social institutions, beliefs, values and practices serve to address pragmatic concerns. In many ways, the theorem derives from the longer-established structural functionalism, yet the two theorems diverge from one another significantly. While both maintain the fundamental belief that a social structure is composed of many interdependent frames of reference, biological functionalists criticise the structural view that a social solidarity and collective conscience is required in a functioning system. By that fact, biological functionalism maintains that our individual survival and health is the driving provocation of actions, and that the importance of social rigidity is negligible.

=== Everyday application ===
Although the actions of humans without doubt do not always engender positive results for the individual, a biological functionalist would argue that the intention was still self-preservation, albeit unsuccessful. An example of this is the belief in luck as an entity; while a disproportionately strong belief in good luck may lead to undesirable results, such as a huge loss in money from gambling, biological functionalism maintains that the newly created ability of the gambler to condemn luck will allow them to be free of individual blame, thus serving a practical and individual purpose. In this sense, biological functionalism maintains that while bad results often occur in life, which do not serve any pragmatic concerns, an entrenched cognitive psychological motivation was attempting to create a positive result, in spite of its eventual failure.

== Decline ==
Structural functionalism reached the peak of its influence in the 1940s and 1950s, and by the 1960s was in rapid decline. By the 1980s, its place was taken in Europe by more conflict-oriented approaches, and more recently by structuralism. While some of the critical approaches also gained popularity in the United States, the mainstream of the discipline has instead shifted to a myriad of empirically oriented middle-range theories with no overarching theoretical orientation. To most sociologists, functionalism is now "as dead as a dodo".

As the influence of functionalism in the 1960s began to wane, the linguistic and cultural turns led to a myriad of new movements in the social sciences: "According to Giddens, the orthodox consensus terminated in the late 1960s and 1970s as the middle ground shared by otherwise competing perspectives gave way and was replaced by a baffling variety of competing perspectives. This third generation of social theory includes phenomenologically inspired approaches, critical theory, ethnomethodology, symbolic interactionism, structuralism, post-structuralism, and theories written in the tradition of hermeneutics and ordinary language philosophy."

While absent from empirical sociology, functionalist themes remained detectable in sociological theory, most notably in the works of Luhmann and Giddens. There are, however, signs of an incipient revival, as functionalist claims have recently been bolstered by developments in multilevel selection theory and in empirical research on how groups solve social dilemmas. Recent developments in evolutionary theory—especially by biologist David Sloan Wilson and anthropologists Robert Boyd and Peter Richerson—have provided strong support for structural functionalism in the form of multilevel selection theory. In this theory, culture and social structure are seen as a Darwinian (biological or cultural) adaptation at the group level.

== Criticisms ==
In the 1960s, functionalism was criticized for being unable to account for social change, or for structural contradictions and conflict (and thus was often called "consensus theory"). Also, it ignores inequalities including race, gender, class, which cause tension and conflict. The refutation of the second criticism of functionalism, that it is static and has no concept of change, has already been articulated above, concluding that while Parsons' theory allows for change, it is an orderly process of change [Parsons, 1961:38], a moving equilibrium. Therefore, referring to Parsons' theory of society as static is inaccurate. It is true that it does place emphasis on equilibrium and the maintenance or quick return to social order, but this is a product of the time in which Parsons was writing (post-World War II, and the start of the cold war). Society was in upheaval and fear abounded. At the time social order was crucial, and this is reflected in Parsons' tendency to promote equilibrium and social order rather than social change.

Furthermore, Durkheim favoured a radical form of guild socialism along with functionalist explanations. Also, Marxism, while acknowledging social contradictions, still uses functionalist explanations. Parsons' evolutionary theory describes the differentiation and reintegration systems and subsystems and thus at least temporary conflict before reintegration (ibid). "The fact that functional analysis can be seen by some as inherently conservative and by others as inherently radical suggests that it may be inherently neither one nor the other."

Stronger criticisms include the epistemological argument that functionalism is tautologous, that is, it attempts to account for the development of social institutions solely through recourse to the effects that are attributed to them, and thereby explains the two circularly. However, Parsons drew directly on many of Durkheim's concepts in creating his theory. Certainly Durkheim was one of the first theorists to explain a phenomenon with reference to the function it served for society. He said, "the determination of function is…necessary for the complete explanation of the phenomena." However Durkheim made a clear distinction between historical and functional analysis, saying, "When ... the explanation of a social phenomenon is undertaken, we must seek separately the efficient cause which produces it and the function it fulfills." If Durkheim made this distinction, then it is unlikely that Parsons did not.

However Merton does explicitly state that functional analysis does not seek to explain why the action happened in the first instance, but why it continues or is reproduced. By this particular logic, it can be argued that functionalists do not necessarily explain the original cause of a phenomenon with reference to its effect. Yet the logic stated in reverse, that social phenomena are (re)produced because they serve ends, is unoriginal to functionalist thought. Thus functionalism is either undefinable or it can be defined by the teleological arguments which functionalist theorists normatively produced before Merton.

Another criticism describes the ontological argument that society cannot have "needs" as a human being does, and even if society does have needs they need not be met. Anthony Giddens argues that functionalist explanations may all be rewritten as historical accounts of individual human actions and consequences (see Structuration).

A further criticism directed at functionalism is that it contains no sense of agency, that individuals are seen as puppets, acting as their role requires. Yet Holmwood states that the most sophisticated forms of functionalism are based on "a highly developed concept of action," and as was explained above, Parsons took as his starting point the individual and their actions. His theory did not however articulate how these actors exercise their agency in opposition to the socialization and inculcation of accepted norms. As has been shown above, Merton addressed this limitation through his concept of deviance, and so it can be seen that functionalism allows for agency. It cannot, however, explain why individuals choose to accept or reject the accepted norms, why and in what circumstances they choose to exercise their agency, and this does remain a considerable limitation of the theory.

Further criticisms have been levelled at functionalism by proponents of other social theories, particularly conflict theorists, Marxists, feminists and postmodernists. Conflict theorists criticized functionalism's concept of systems as giving far too much weight to integration and consensus, and neglecting independence and conflict. Lockwood, in line with conflict theory, suggested that Parsons' theory missed the concept of system contradiction. He did not account for those parts of the system that might have tendencies to mal-integration. According to Lockwood, it was these tendencies that come to the surface as opposition and conflict among actors. However Parsons thought that the issues of conflict and cooperation were very much intertwined and sought to account for both in his model. In this however he was limited by his analysis of an 'ideal type' of society which was characterized by consensus. Merton, through his critique of functional unity, introduced into functionalism an explicit analysis of tension and conflict. Yet Merton's functionalist explanations of social phenomena continued to rest on the idea that society is primarily co-operative rather than conflicted, which differentiates Merton from conflict theorists.

Marxism, which was revived soon after the emergence of conflict theory, criticized professional sociology (functionalism and conflict theory alike) for being partisan to advanced welfare capitalism. Gouldner thought that Parsons' theory specifically was an expression of the dominant interests of welfare capitalism, that it justified institutions with reference to the function they fulfill for society. It may be that Parsons' work implied or articulated that certain institutions were necessary to fulfill the functional prerequisites of society, but whether or not this is the case, Merton explicitly states that institutions are not indispensable and that there are functional alternatives. That he does not identify any alternatives to the current institutions does reflect a conservative bias, which as has been stated before is a product of the specific time that he was writing in.

As functionalism's prominence was ending, feminism was on the rise, and it attempted a radical criticism of functionalism. It believed that functionalism neglected the suppression of women within the family structure. Holmwood shows, however, that Parsons did in fact describe the situations where tensions and conflict existed or were about to take place, even if he did not articulate those conflicts. Some feminists agree, suggesting that Parsons provided accurate descriptions of these situations. On the other hand, Parsons recognized that he had oversimplified his functional analysis of women in relation to work and the family, and focused on the positive functions of the family for society and not on its dysfunctions for women. Merton, too, although addressing situations where function and dysfunction occurred simultaneously, lacked a "feminist sensibility".

Postmodernism, as a theory, is critical of claims of objectivity. Therefore, the idea of grand theory and grand narrative that can explain society in all its forms is treated with skepticism. This critique focuses on exposing the danger that grand theory can pose when not seen as a limited perspective, as one way of understanding society.

Jeffrey Alexander (1985) sees functionalism as a broad school rather than a specific method or system, such as Parsons, who is capable of taking equilibrium (stability) as a reference-point rather than assumption and treats structural differentiation as a major form of social change. The name 'functionalism' implies a difference of method or interpretation that does not exist. This removes the determinism criticized above. Cohen argues that rather than needs a society has dispositional facts: features of the social environment that support the existence of particular social institutions but do not cause them.

== Influential theorists ==
- Kingsley Davis
- Michael Denton
- Émile Durkheim
- David Keen
- Niklas Luhmann
- Bronisław Malinowski
- Robert K. Merton
- Wilbert E. Moore
- George Murdock
- Talcott Parsons
- Alfred Reginald Radcliffe-Brown
- Herbert Spencer
- Fei Xiaotong

== See also ==
- Causation (sociology)
- Functional structuralism
- Historicism
- Neofunctionalism (sociology)
- New institutional economics
- Pure sociology
- Sociotechnical system
- Systems theory
- Vacancy chain
- Dennis Wrong (critic of structural functionalism)
