= Causation (sociology) =

Belief that events occur in predictable ways and that one event leads to another

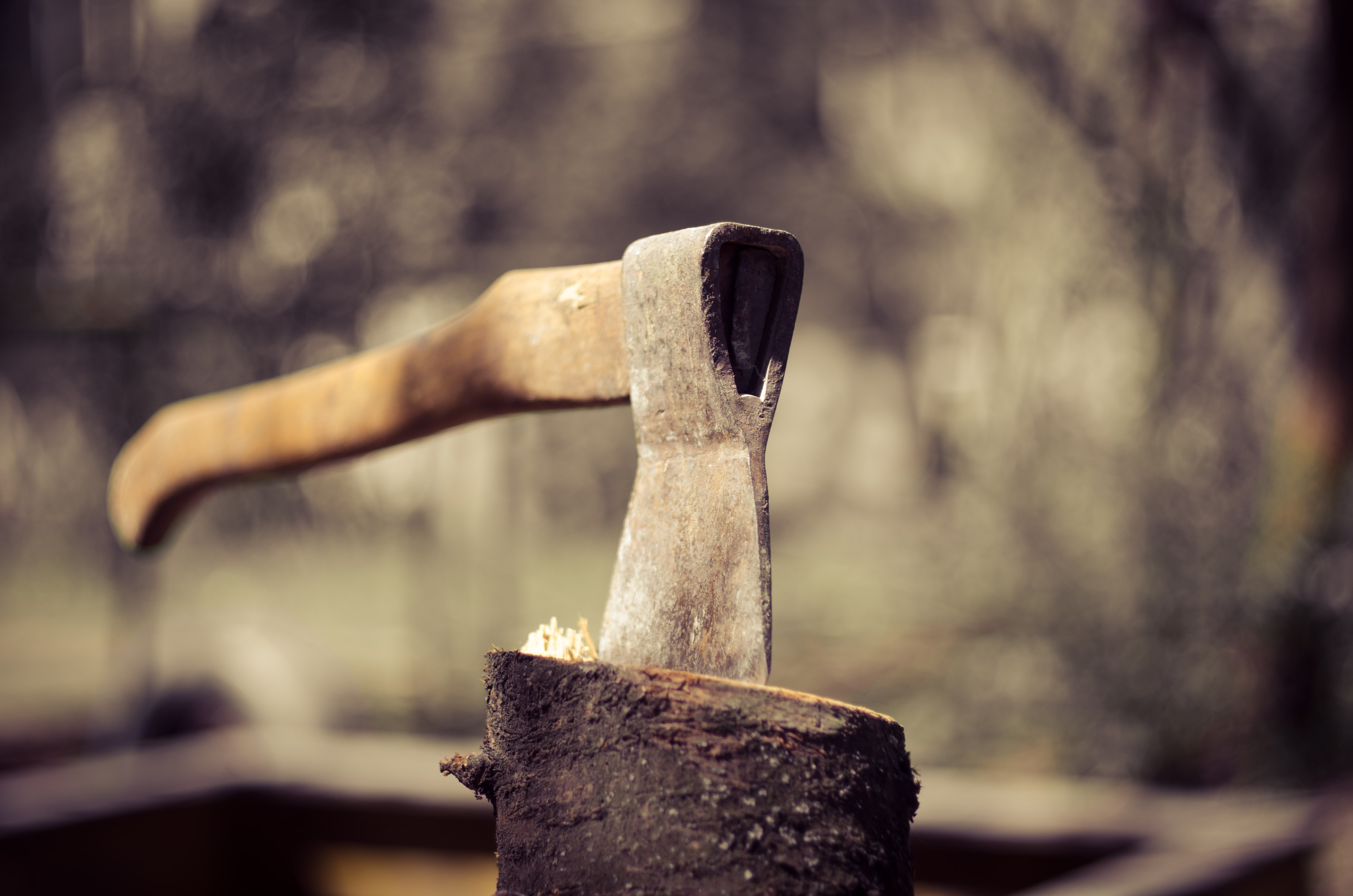

Causation refers to the existence of "cause and effect" relationships between multiple variables. Causation presumes that variables, which act in a predictable manner, can produce change in related variables and that this relationship can be deduced through direct and repeated observation. Theories of causation underpin social research as it aims to deduce causal relationships between structural phenomena and individuals and explain these relationships through the application and development of theory. Due to divergence amongst theoretical and methodological approaches, different theories, namely functionalism, all maintain varying conceptions on the nature of causality and causal relationships. Similarly, a multiplicity of causes have led to the distinction between necessary and sufficient causes.

== Logical formulation of the causal relationship ==
- A and B represent some form of phenomena (either concrete or abstract),

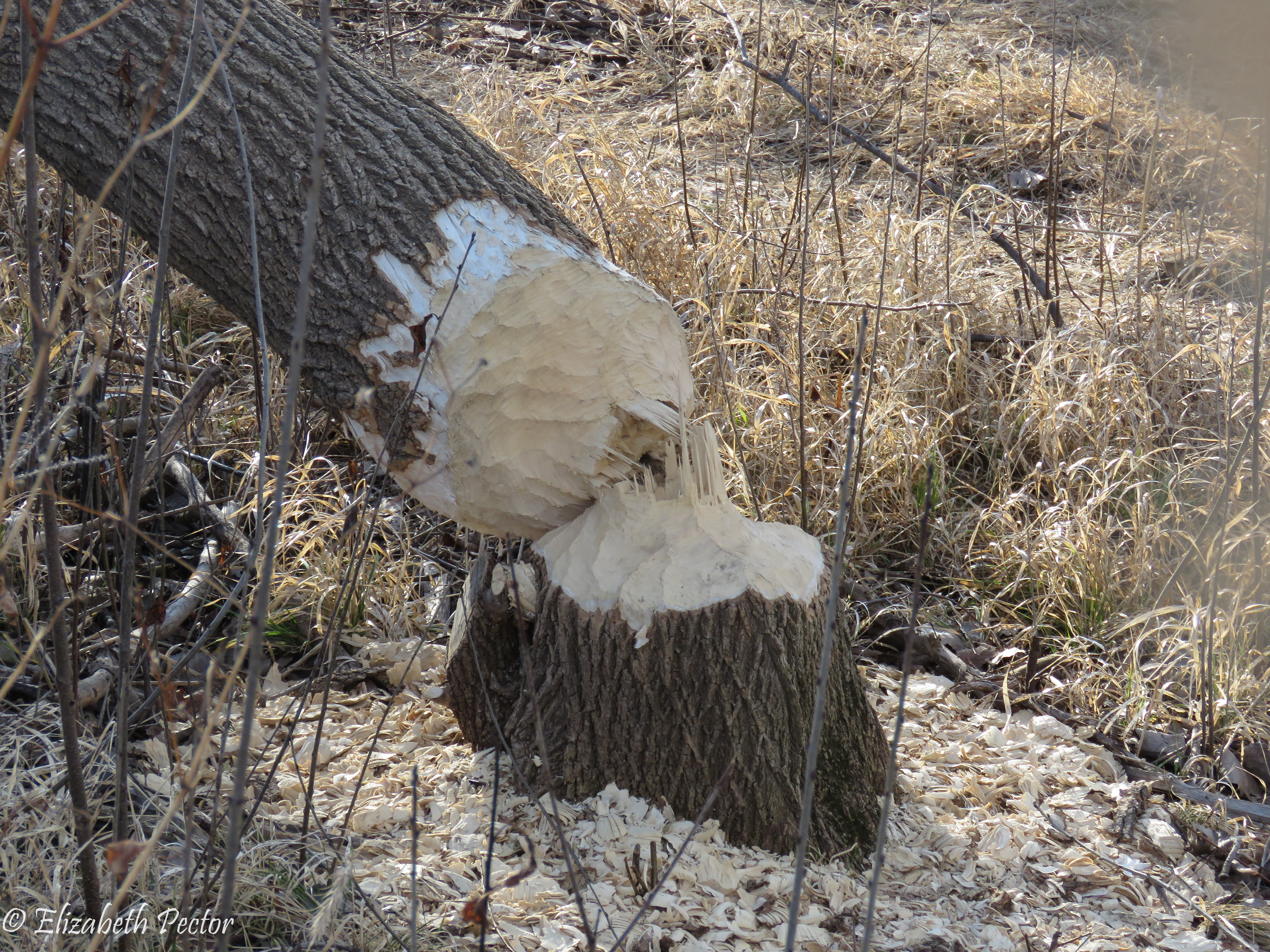

- A is statistically related to B in so far as an observed change in A will produce a proportional change in B,

- If the change to A precedes the change to B and the change is not caused by an intervening variable (spurious relationship) then:

- A is said to have a causal relationship (either sufficient or necessary) to B.

This nature, extent, and scope of this relationship, however, must be further defined through further research that accounts for the weaknesses and limitations of preceding works.

== Causation and social research ==
Classical conceptions of causation have demonstrably informed the development of social research and different methodological approaches, as the vast majority of research seeks to explain phenomena in terms of cause and effect. Typical criteria for inferring a causal relationship includes: i) a statistical association between the two variables ii) the direction of influence (that changes in the causal factor induce change in the dependent variable) and; iii) a requirement that the relationship between variables is non-spurious. The identification of intervening variables and further replications of studies can also strengthen claims of causal inference. Different methodological approaches make tradeoffs between statistical rigor (the ability to confidently attribute change to one variable or cause), qualitative depth, and finances available for research. Experimental methods, which maximize statistical rigor, are often difficult to conduct as they are expensive and can be detached from the social processes that researchers seek to undertake. In contrast, ethnographical methods and surveys, which maximize the qualitative richness of the data, lack the statistical generalizability that experimental studies produce. As such, causality deduced from social research can be relatively abstract (findings from an ethnography) or exact (statistical research, laboratory studies). As such, care must always be taken when attributing or describing causal relationships from the findings of social research, as this will vary based on methodology and, consequently, the nature of the data.

== Sufficient and necessary causes ==
Causality, within sociology, has been the subject of epistemological debates, particularly concerning the external validity of research findings; one factor driving the tenuous nature of causation within social research is the wide variety of potential "causes" that can be attributed to a particular phenomena. Max Weber, in The Protestant Ethic and the Spirit of Capitalism, attributed the development of capitalism in Northern Europe to the regional prominence of Protestant Religions. Material and geographical variables, however, also played a significant role in the proliferation of Puritan beliefs and this was a central criticism levied at Weber's study. Talcott Parsons asserted that such an interpretation of Weber's thoughts were reductive and misdirect from Weber's assertions: that the congruency between the Protestant ethic and modern capitalism was necessary for the unprecedented growth of wealth in Northern Europe whereas material factors were merely sufficient.

To this end, Weber identified two types of causation;

- adequate causation refers to a context in which any one of a number of sufficient factors could be responsible for prompting an event (the absence of a single factor would not have led to a different outcome).
- chance causation refers to a situation in which one factor was of particular importance for the occurrence of a particular event.

Several causes, either sufficient or necessary, often intersect and interact with one another to produce a given phenomena and, as such, theories of single or essential causality are often not adequate for social research. For this reason, statistical models that can account for and control several variables are prevalent in social research.

== A functionalist theory of causation ==
Normative conceptions of causation, that have served to inform the development of social research standards, is largely associated with Functionalist and Newtonian thought and was introduced to social research through individuals like Comte and Durkheim. This broader paradigm shift in social research is often associated with the push for sociology to be recognized amongst natural sciences. This perspective of causation perceives individuals, structural variables, and the relationships amongst them strictly in terms of their functional and productive outputs. As such, causal relationships must be observed and deduced through scientific observation.

In relation to culture, causality underpins the logic surrounding socio-cultural norms and deviance. Social structures serve the function of establishing, propagating, and enforcing both cultural and legal norms and, as such, play an indispensable role in constituting and maintaining social order; for these standards to be effective, however, they must be applied universally and in a predictable manner. If this holds, norm violations and punishment can be said to have a causal relationship in that the violation of a standard directly produces equivalent sanctions. Through punishment, standards are then visibly reaffirmed throughout the general populace. All humanistic societies, to varying degrees, function on some principle of causality.

=== Elective affinity ===
The concept of elective affinity was used by Max Weber to describe the relationship between capitalism and the Protestant ethic and differs from a purely deterministic account of individual behavior. The Newtonian notion of causality underpins the deterministic camp of the structure-agency debate whereas interactionist paradigms emphasize the rational choices that more or less free individuals make in light of broader social forces that guide them. Rather than social forces playing an essentialized role in determining the life course; rational individuals make personal choices based on the knowledge, experiences, and resources they have at their disposal. As such, elective affinity serves to incorporate both structuralist and agent-focused paradigms by incorporating the (admittedly varying) capacity of social actors to make choices in light of their personal experiences and resources. Such a distinction, however, is largely theoretical and is further confounded by Weber's use of the Ideal type schema. Furthermore, the level of primacy allotted to agency and structure varies between different social theories and, correspondingly, different notions of causal relationships.
