= Christopher Fyfe =

Scottish historian

Christopher Fyfe (9 November 1920 – 26 August 2008) was a Scottish historian most noted for his work on Sierra Leone in West Africa.

== Biography ==
Christopher Hamilton Fyfe was born in England in 1920 to a family of Scottish ancestry. His father moved to Ontario, Canada, where he became principal of Queen's University. The family subsequently moved to Aberdeen, where his father served a similar role at Aberdeen University.

Fyfe graduated from Gordonstoun School and entered University College, Oxford. His studies were interrupted by a spell in the Army during World War II as a gunner. After graduating from college, he became a school teacher in Düsseldorf, West Germany.

In 1950 Fyfe was invited by his brother-in-law, who was with the colonial secretariat in Freetown, to organise the Sierra Leonean archives. After two years as the government archivist, preserving and classifying precious documents, and teaching assistants, he returned to England. There he lived first in London, then Bristol and Belfast.

Fyfe spent ten years working on his seminal History of Sierra Leone (1962). He modelled his 852-page text on James Joyce's novel Ulysses, writing it as a single block of text. When the publisher demanded chapters, Fyfe inserted numbered breaks.

In his masterwork, Fyfe explored the history of the Creole (Krio people) of Sierra Leone, celebrating their role as "the unrecognised vehicle by which not only British rule but trade, education, and Christianity, were conveyed to west Africa". His work stimulated scholars from Sierra Leone, who studied the Creoles specifically. Some Creole scholars later adopted the ethnonym of the term 'Krio' for both the Sierra Leone Creole people and the creole language.

Following the publication of his book, Fyfe took up a lectureship at the University of Edinburgh in 1962, at the newly founded Centre of African Studies. He became a reader in 1964, retaining this position until his retirement in 1991. The bicentenary of Freetown was celebrated in 1987 with an international, interdisciplinary conference, at which Fyfe was honoured as a father of the Krio cultural revival.

He edited the Journal of African History and wrote numerous reviews of new books in the field. He regularly revised his lectures in light of the latest trends in historical research. He published a biography of James Africanus Horton, the first African graduate of the University of Edinburgh; a collection of letters written by freedmen who settled in Sierra Leone; and edited works with other historians.

Fyfe produced a shorter history of Sierra Leone, which was used as a school text book in Sierra Leone. He was a mentor to many younger researchers of Sierra Leone. Some became key figures in the intellectual establishment of Freetown. Some became at odds with various governments and had to go into exile.

Fyfe was active in the arts scene in Edinburgh. He helped preserve Old Town from motorway development that would have cut through the historic architecture. He died in London in 2008, aged 87.

== Books ==
- (editor), Sierra Leone Inheritance (1964), documentary anthology
- African Studies since 1945: A Tribute to Basil Davidson (Proceedings of a Seminar in Honour of Basil Davidson's Sixtieth Birthday held at the Centre of African Studies, University of Edinburgh, under the Chairmanship of George Shepperson by Basil Davidson, Christopher Fyfe, University of Edinburgh, Centre of African Studies Staff), Longman Publishing Group, ISBN 0-582-64207-8
- Africanus Horton: West African Scientist and Patriot, Gregg Revivals, ISBN 0-7512-0085-9
- Africanus Horton, 1835–1883, Oxford University Press, ISBN 0-19-501500-2
- Anna Maria Falconbridge: Narrative of Two Voyages to the River Sierra Leone During the Years 1791-1792-1793, Liverpool University Press, ISBN 0-85323-643-7
- A History of Sierra Leone, Gregg Revivals, ISBN 0-7512-0086-7
- Our Children Free and Happy: Letters from Black Settlers in Africa in the 1760s, Edinburgh University Press, ISBN 0-7486-0270-4
- People of the Cape Verde Islands: Exploitation and Emigration, with Antonio Carreira, C. Hurst & Co., ISBN 0-905838-68-8
- Rethinking African History, University of Edinburgh, Simon A. McGrath, Centre of African Studies, University of Edinburgh, ISBN 0-9527917-1-4
- A Short History of Sierra Leone, Addison-Wesley Longman, ISBN 0-582-60358-7
- Sierra Leone, 1787–1987: Two Centuries of Intellectual Life, with Murray Last, Paul Richards, Manchester University Press, ISBN 0-7190-2791-8
