= Consensus theory =

Social theory

Consensus theory is a social theory that holds a particular political or economic system as a fair system, and that social change should take place within the social institutions provided by it. Consensus theory contrasts sharply with conflict theory, which holds that social change is only achieved through conflict.

Under consensus theory the absence of conflict is seen as the equilibrium state of society and that there is a general or widespread agreement among all members of a particular society about norms, values, rules and regulations. Consensus theory is concerned with the maintenance or continuation of social order in society.

Consensus theory serves as a sociological argument for the furtherance and preservation of the status quo. It is antagonistic to conflict theory, which serves as a sociological argument for modifying the status quo or for its total reversal. In consensus theory, the rules are seen as integrative, and whoever does not respect them is a deviant person. Under conflict theory, the rules are seen as coercive, and who transgresses them is considered an agent of change.

== See also ==
- Émile Durkheim
- Talcott Parsons
- Karl Marx
- Max Weber
- Antonio Gramsci
- Robert Merton
- Louis Althusser
- Ralf Dahrendorf
- George Herbert Mead
- Herbert Blumer
- Structural functionalism
- Conservatism
- Consensus reality
