= Wilbert E. Moore =

American sociologist (1914–1987)

Wilbert E. Moore (26 October 1914 – 29 December 1987) was an American sociologist noted, with Kingsley Davis, for their explanation and justification for social stratification, based their idea of "functional necessity."

== Biography ==
Moore took his Ph.D. at Harvard University's Department of Sociology in 1940. Moore along with Kingsley Davis, Robert Merton and John Riley were part of Talcott Parsons first group of PhD students. Moore is perhaps best known for Some Principles of Stratification (written with Davis). Moore and Davis wrote this paper while at Princeton University where he remained until mid-1960s. This was followed by a period at the Russell Sage Foundation before moving to the University of Denver where he stayed until his retirement.

Moore was the 56th president of the American Sociological Association and an elected member of the American Philosophical Society and the American Academy of Arts and Sciences.

== Selected publications ==
- Davis, Kingsley and Wilbert E. Moore. (1945) Some Principles of Stratification. American Sociological Review 10 (April): 242–249
- Moore, Wilbert E; Tumin, Melvin (1949). Some social functions of ignorance. American Sociological Review Vol. 14, No. 6 (Dec., 1949), pp. 787–795
- Moore, Wilbert E. (1964) Social Change, Prentice Hall: New Jersey

== See also ==
- Davis–Moore hypothesis
