= Kingsley Davis =

American sociologist and demographer

- Born: August 20, 1908; Jones County, Texas
- Died: February 27, 1997 (aged 88); Stanford, California

Academic background
- Education: University of Texas; Harvard University
- Doctoral advisor: W. Lloyd Warner

Kingsley Davis (August 20, 1908 – February 27, 1997) was an internationally recognized American sociologist and demographer. He was identified by the American Philosophical Society as one of the most outstanding social scientists of the twentieth century, and was a Hoover Institution senior research fellow.

== Education and career ==
Davis received his Ph.D. from Harvard University and taught at Smith College, Clark University, Pennsylvania State University, Princeton University, Columbia University, the University of California at Berkeley and the University of Southern California.

Among his other accomplishments, Davis

- served as president of the Population Association of America and the American Sociological Association
- represented the United States on the United Nations Population Commission
- member of the Advisory Council of the National Aeronautics and Space Administration and the Advisory Committee on Population for the U.S. Bureau of the Census
- was an elected member of both the American Philosophical Society (1960) and the American Academy of Arts and Sciences (1964).
- was the first sociologist in the United States to be elected to the National Academy of Sciences (1966).

Davis won the Irene B. Taeuber Award for outstanding research in demography (1978), the Common Wealth Award for distinguished work in sociology (1979), and the Career of Distinguished Scholarship Award from the American Sociological Association (1982). In 1953 he was elected as a Fellow of the American Statistical Association.

== Research ==
Davis led and conducted major studies of societies in Europe, South America, Africa and Asia, coined the term "population explosion", and played a major role in the naming and development of the demographic transition model. He was also one of the original scholars in the development of the theory of overurbanization. He is also credited with coining the term "zero population growth" although George Stolnitz claimed to have that distinction.

Davis had several children while espousing limitations on childbearing worldwide. Davis also published an influential article with Wilbert E. Moore entitled "Some Principles of Stratification," which was a very influential functionalist account of the reasons for social inequality. Davis and Moore synthesize Durkheim and Parsons to argue for the "functional necessity" of some positions over others: those that are highest paid go to the most deserving individuals; at the same time, the differential rewards motivates individuals to work to fill positions they might otherwise not. Thus, from this perspective, illness is a deviant state because it means that the individual may not be able to fill their role. Sociologists see this article as a paradigmatic case of functionalist logic, and indeed, Davis came to be a leading figure in this school of sociology.

As a demographer, Davis was internationally recognized for his expertise in world population growth and resources, the history and theory of international migration, world urbanization, demographic transition and population policy.

== Published works ==
Kingsley Davis was a prolific scholar who published numerous research articles, book chapters and books.

=== Books ===
- Davis, Kingsley (1935). Youth in the Depression. University of Chicago Press.
- —— (1949). Human Society. MacMillan.
- —— (1949). Modern Society. Rinehart.
- —— (1951). The Population of India and Pakistan. Princeton University Press.
- —— (1960). A Structural Analysis of Kinship. Arno.
- —— (1961). Population Policy and Economic Development. Stanford Research Institute.
- —— (1965). The Population Impact on Children in the World's Agrarian Countries. Institute of International Studies.
- —— Stylkes, Frederick G. (1971). California's Twenty Million. University of California.
- —— (1973). Cities: Their Origin, Growth and Human Impact. Freeman. ISBN 9780716708704.
- —— (1972). World Urbanization 1950–1970. Institute of International Studies.

=== Chapters ===
- —— Kahl, Joseph A. (1959). "Introduction". The American Class Structure. Rinehart.
- —— (1961). Turner, R. (ed.). India's Urban Future. University of Michigan.
- —— (1965). "The Urbanization of the Human Population". Cities. Scientific American Book. Knopf.

=== Edited volumes ===
- Davis, Kingsley, ed. (1945). World Population in Transition. American Academy of Political and Social Science.
- ——, ed. (1987). Below Replacement Fertility in Industrial Societies. Cambridge University Press.
- Davis, Kingsley; Bernstam, Mikhail; Sellers, Helen M., eds. (1989). Population and Resources in a Changing World. Morrison Institute for Population and Resource Studies.
- Davis, Kingsley; Bernstam, Mikhail, eds. (1991). Resources, Environment, and Population. Oxford University Press.

=== Other writing ===
In the popular press, Davis' work appeared in "Scientific American," "Science," the "New York Times Magazine," "Commentary," "Foreign Affairs" and numerous newspapers.

In 1957, Davis predicted that population of the world would reach six billion by the year 2000. He was remarkably close; that population figure was reached in October 1999.
