= Melvin Tumin =

American sociologist (1919–1994)

Melvin M. Tumin
- Born: February 10, 1919; Newark, New Jersey, U.S.
- Died: March 3, 1994 (aged 75); Princeton, New Jersey, U.S.
- Occupation: Sociologist
- Known for: Studying race relations, social stratification, education, crime and violence

Melvin Marvin Tumin (February 10, 1919 – March 3, 1994) was an American sociologist who specialized in race relations. He taught at Princeton University for much of his career.

== Early life ==
Tumin was born and grew up in Newark, New Jersey. His mother, Rose Yawitz Tumin, raised him and his two brothers on her own after the death of his father when Tumin was in his very early teens. He was the middle brother; Edward Tumin was his younger brother, and Israel Tumin was his older brother. He earned his undergraduate degree in psychology from University of Wisconsin–Madison in 1939. He received his Ph.D. in sociology and anthropology from Northwestern University in 1944. While attending graduate school, he shared an apartment in Chicago with future author, Saul Bellow.

According to Tumin, as told to his sons, Bellow incorporated words from a conversation he had at some point into Bellow's first novel, Dangling Man. Like Tumin, Bellow received a degree in sociology and anthropology from Northwestern. In the early 1940s, Tumin did field work for his doctoral thesis in Guatemala; this was later published as his first book, Caste in a Peasant Society. To ensure his safety while in Guatemala (a dictatorship at that time), he obtained and carried on him a letter from the then head of internal security warning that no harm was to be done to him.

== Career ==
After graduating, Tumin taught at Wayne State University and served on the Mayor's Commission on Race Relations in Detroit. In 1947 he joined Princeton University, where he held appointments until his retirement in 1989; he was appointed as a full professor sometime in the early 1960s. Tumin's work on racial segregation and desegregation was published by the Anti-Defamation League in 1957. In the 1960s he also taught at Columbia University Teachers College.

Tumin was President of The Society for the Study of Social Problems for the period 1966-67. Tumin received a Guggenheim Fellowship in 1969.

Tumin directed a task force of the U.S. National Commission on the Causes and Prevention of Violence and was an author of three volumes of its 1970 report Crimes of Violence.

=== Social stratification ===
In 1953 Tumin challenged the Davis–Moore hypothesis of social stratification with his paper "Some principles of stratification: a critical analysis". Tumin took Davis–Moore to imply that social stratification was mostly inevitable and provided a positive function for society. He analyzed the arguments of Davis and Moore and found them wanting in a number of respects. He offered a contrasting view of social stratification, defining it as a hierarchical arrangement within any social group or society where positions are unequal in terms of power, wealth, social standing, and personal satisfaction. He directly challenged Davis and Moore's assertion that the functional importance of different social roles could be objectively determined. Tumin argued that talent and ability lack objective measurement, contrary to Davis and Moore's belief. He also pointed out the absence of equal opportunities and questioned the notion that trainees in organizations make significant sacrifices. Furthermore, Tumin contended that rewards are not the sole motivator for individuals. In a reply to Tumin's paper, Davis stated that his ideas seek to explain inequality, rather than justify it. Davis also accused Tumin of a number of errors. Tumin's 1967 book Social Stratification: The Forms and Functions of Inequality was widely used as a textbook and was re-issued in 1985.

== Death ==
Tumin died of cancer at the Medical Center in Princeton, New Jersey. In 1994, the Princeton University Sociology Department established an annual Melvin M. Tumin lecture, in honor of Tumin. According to the press release issued by the University, these annual lectures honor "the memory of Professor Melvin Tumin, whose writing on social inequality edified and inspired a generation of American social scientists."

== Inspiration for The Human Stain ==
Tumin's friend, the author Philip Roth, said that his novel The Human Stain (2000) was inspired by an incident in which Tumin inquired about two students who had not attended his class all semester, asking, "Does anyone know these people? Do they exist or are they spooks?" Unbeknownst to Tumin, both students were African American. As spooks can be a racial slur for black people (in addition to meaning ghosts or spies), the university subjected him to an inquiry into possible hate speech, described by Roth as a "witch hunt." Tumin eventually emerged blameless.

== Selected publications ==
- Moore, Wilbert E; Tumin, Melvin (1949). Some social functions of ignorance. American Sociological Review Vol. 14, No. 6 (Dec., 1949), pp. 787–795
- Tumin, Melvin (1953). Some principles of stratification: A critical analysis. American Sociological Review Vol. 18, No. 4 (Aug., 1953), pp. 387–394
- Tumin, Melvin (1957). Some unapplauded consequences of social mobility in a mass society. Social Forces Vol. 36 p. 32 ff. (1957-1958)
- Tumin, Melvin (1958). Desegregation: Resistance and Readiness Princeton University Press, ISBN 9780691093130
- Tumin, Melvin (1961). Social Class and Social Change in Puerto Rico. ISBN 9780691086132
- Tumin, Melvin (1967). Social Stratification: The Forms and Functions of Inequality. Prentice-Hall, ISBN 9780138185916
- Tumin, Melvin (1975). Caste in a Peasant Society: A Case Study in the Dynamics of Caste. Greenwood Press, ISBN 978-0-8371-8390-9
