= Social conflict theory =

Sociological theory

Social conflict theory is a Marxist-based social theory which argues that individuals and groups (social classes) within society interact on the basis of conflict rather than consensus. Through various forms of conflict, groups will tend to attain differing amounts of material and non-material resources (e.g. the wealthy vs. the poor). More powerful groups will tend to use their power in order to retain power and exploit groups with less power.

Conflict theorists view conflict as an engine of change, since conflict produces contradictions which are sometimes resolved, creating new conflicts and contradictions in an ongoing dialectic. In the classic example of historical materialism, Karl Marx and Friedrich Engels argued that all of human history is the result of conflict between classes, which evolved over time in accordance with changes in society's means of meeting its material needs, i.e. changes in society's mode of production.

== Example (sample of the following) ==
Consider the relationship between the owner of a housing complex and a tenant in that same housing complex. A consensus theorist might suggest that the relationship between the owner and the tenant is founded on mutual benefit. In contrast, a conflict theorist might argue the relationship is based on a conflict in which the owner and tenant are struggling against each other. Their relationship is defined by the balance in their abilities to extract resources from each other, e.g. rent payments or a place to live. The bounds of the relationship are set where each is extracting the maximum possible amount of resources out of the other.

Conflict can take many forms and involve struggle over many different types of resources, including status. However, formal conflict theory had its foundations in the analysis of class conflict, and the example of the owner and the tenant can be understood in terms of class conflict. In class conflict, owners are likely to have relative advantages over non-owners. For example, the legal system underlying the relationship between the owner and tenant can be biased in favor of the owner. Suppose the owner wishes to keep the tenant's security deposit after that tenant has moved out of the owner's residence. In legal systems based on English common law, the owner is only required to notify the tenant that the security deposit is being withheld. To regain the security deposit, the tenant must file a lawsuit. The tenant bears the burden of proof and is therefore required to prove that the residence was adequately cleaned before move-out. This can be a very difficult or even impossible task.

To summarize the example, conflict theorists view the relationship between the owner and tenant as being built primarily on conflict rather than harmony. Even though the owner-tenant relationship may often appear harmonious, any visible harmony is only a product of the law and other elements of the superstructure which constrain the relationship and which are themselves a product of an even deeper conflict, class conflict. A conflict theorist would say that conflict theory holds more explanatory power than consensus theory in this situation since consensus theory cannot explain lawsuits between owners and tenants nor the legal foundations of the asymmetrical power relationship between the two.

== Social conflict theories ==
From a social-conflict theorist/Marxist point of view social class and inequality emerges because the social structure is based on conflict and contradictions. Contradictions in interests and conflict over scarce resources between groups is the foundation of social society, according to the social conflict theory. The higher class will try to maintain their privileges, power, status and social position—and therefore try to influence politics, education, and other institutions to protect and limit access to their forms of capital and resources. Whereas the lower class—in contradiction to the higher class—has very different interests. They do not have specific forms of capital that they need to protect. All they are interested in is in gaining access to the resources and capital of the higher class. For example, education: the lower class will do everything to gain access to the higher class resources based on democratizing and liberalizing education systems because these forms of capital are thought to be of value for future success. The various institutions of society such as the legal and political system are instruments of ruling class domination and serve to further its interests. Marx believed that western society developed through four main epochs—primitive communism, ancient society, feudal society and capitalist society. Primitive communism is represented by the societies of pre-history and provides the only example of the classless society. From then all societies are divided into two major classes—master and slaves in ancient society, lords and serfs in feudal society and capitalist and wage laborers in capitalist society.

Weber sees class in economic terms. He argues that classes develop in market economies in which individuals compete for economic gain. He defines a class as a group of individuals who share a similar position in market economy and by virtue of that fact receive similar economic rewards. Thus a person's class situation is basically his market situation. Those who share a similar class situation also share similar life chances. Their economic position will directly affect their chances of obtaining the things defined as desirable in their society.

Social conflict theory is also used to understand gender inequalities. One theory that is based on social-conflict ideas is radical feminist theory and feminism in general. According to a professor of political science in Belgrade, Jelena Vukoičić, radical feminism is a feminist theory that starts from the idea of conflict between the sexes as a fundamental conflict, and oppression against women as a direct implication of patriarchy. This theory rests on the assumption that all social activity is the result of certain restrictions and coercion, and although every social system contains specific forms of interactive constraints, they do not have to cause repression.

== See also ==
- Identity politics
- Iron law of oligarchy
- Group decision-making
- Marxist cultural analysis
- Evidence-based policy
- Autonomy
