= Symbolism of terrorism =

Terrorism, in some of its definitions, serves to communicate a message from terrorists to a target audience (TA). By extension, symbols play an important role in such communication, through graphics that the organizations use to represent themselves, as well as the meaning and significance behind their choice of targets.

== Symbolism of terrorist groups ==
Terrorist organizations use graphic marks and insignias as symbols to represent their ideology, purpose, and goals. These insignias are replete with meaningful symbols that communicate the message, purpose, history, and goals of the organizations. As such, they contribute to the creation of unique organizational culture. A few databases exist which catalog the symbols used in terrorist images and propaganda, the most prominent of which are the International Terrorist Symbols Database and the Islamic Imagery Project. Also exist the academic research "Terroristica".

=== International Terrorist Symbols Database ===
The International Terrorist Symbols Database is a compilation of insignias from terrorist organizations put together by the Anti-Defamation League. Published on their website, it features profiles of thirty different symbols from groups such as Al Qaeda in Iraq, Hamas, Hezbollah, the Muslim Brotherhood, the Popular Front for the Liberation of Palestine, and others. Not all of the groups discussed are officially recognized on the U.S. State Department's Foreign Terrorist Organizations list, yet they all have references to attacks made by the organization. Each image profile contains a description of the insignia, an explanation of the symbols involved, and a detailed history of the organization's history, ideology, goals, leaders, and major attacks. Below are examples of a few of the terrorist images included in the database, along with the corresponding analysis of the symbols involved in the image.

==== Al Qaeda in Iraq ====
One of several emblems used by Al Qaeda in Iraq, the adjacent image depicts a gray globe positioned in a black background. On top of the globe is an open Quran, from which a rifle, a fist, and a flag emerge. The yellow writing beneath the globe may be translated as "Monotheism and Jihad."

The flag represents Al Qaeda in Iraq's goal of creating an Islamic caliphate, while its color denotes the death and the militant means the organization is willing to take to achieve this goal. The rifle and fist are also symbols of militancy. By positioning these symbols on top of the Quran, the image communicates the foundation of their mission in Islam, while the globe indicates their worldwide ambitions for their goals.

The color green has represented Islam since its founding. Consequently, the green coloring of the central image indicates the organization's tie to Islam. Similar to the symbolism used by Al Qaeda in Iraq, the rifle represents commitment to militancy, while the globe indicates international involvement and ambition for their goals. The Quran indicates both a foundation in Islam, and their goal to found an Islamic state that encompasses Lebanon and Israel. Finally, the Islamic verse, which is from the Quran, bolsters support for their activities by citing a verse that celebrates and supports those who fight for Islam. The database does not analyze the symbolism of the seven-leafed branch,

==== Muslim Brotherhood ====
The emblem of the Muslim Brotherhood depicts two cross swords beneath a red Quran, both of which are placed within a green circle that sits in a brown square. Inscribed on the Quran is the phrase, "Truly, it is a generous Quran." Below the swords reads, "Be Prepared."

Once again, the color green, as well as the presence of a Quran, symbolizes the foundation of the Muslim Brotherhood in Islam. The presence of swords indicate militancy, yet the choice to use them in the place of guns symbolizes the Muslim Brotherhood's connection to the historic Islam. The motto "Be Prepared" references a verse in the Quran that warns Muslims to be prepared to fight enemies of God. The analysis does not discuss the quote on the Quran.

==== Liberation Tigers of Tamil Eelam ====
The central figure of the image is a yellow tiger, which is surrounded by a ring of bullets and crossed by two rifles. The script both around the tiger, in Tamil, and below the tiger, in English, reads "Liberation Tigers of Tamil Eelam."

Eelam is Tamil for the Island of Sri Lanka, which the groups seeks to liberate from the control of the Sinhalese majority. The tiger is a culturally important animal that symbolizes heroism, militancy, and patriotism. Its centrality in this image indicates the desire of the Liberation Tigers to be self-determined and independent. The bullets and rifles indicate their employment of violence as the means to achieve these goals.

=== The Islamic Imagery Project ===
The Islamic Imagery Project is a report published in 2006 by the Combating Terrorism Center, a division of the Department of Social Sciences at the United States Military Academy. At the most basic level, the report is meant to be a practical exploration of the meaning of various jihadi symbols in order to better understand, and counteract, jihadi thought and the influence of these organizations. The forward to the report cites the powerful role “pictures, motifs, and images,” as well as the emotions they evoke, play in gaining a better understanding of the message and purpose of jihad terrorist groups. The preface explains that the authors intend to extend the study of imagery beyond the realm of art history, into modern symbols of violent jihadi groups, which they cite as the primary method these groups promote and reinforce their ideologies:

“Visual motifs accomplish several objectives for jihadi propagandists. First, they create a mental conception of reality for their audiences. The use of carefully edited images evokes existing emotional or historical memories, eliciting an emotional response that may be conscious or subconscious…. Secondly, they help the author, or propagandist, communicate a message, which is often a visual argument for something or against something. Texts and language, including imagery, provide interactive ways for jihadis to engage the ideology itself.”

Critics of the project have deemed it oversimplified, arguing that much more study has yet to go into a symbolic analysis of terrorist imagery. Others have deemed it the best interpretation, in English, of imagery used by terrorist groups.

The document is a catalog of the 100 most common motifs in jihadist visual propaganda that the Combating Terrorism Center deemed significant. These motifs are sorted into five categories: Nature; Geography, Political Symbols, and States; People; Weapons, Warfare, and the Afterlife; Other. An example of a symbol from each category is provided below.

==== Nature: the Moon ====
The moon is an extremely important symbol in Islam which has astrological, religious, and spiritual significance. Jihadi imagery typically simplifies this complex symbol, using to evoke the notion of the divine and a connection to Islamic identity and, for full moons in particular, the afterlife. When paired with images that reference martyrdom, the moon suggests that there will be a heavenly reward for the martyr. In the example image on the right, the presence of a white horse and clouds around the man's portrait indicate that he is a martyr, and the moon evokes the benefit he will gain for his sacrifice in heaven.

==== Geography, Political Symbols, and States: Inverted Currency ====
Inverted currency is a symbol that seeks to undermine typical power structures of Western countries. Currency is understood by many terrorist groups to represent Western materialism, power, and dominance. It is also an extremely powerful cultural symbol in the West, one that is closely tied to the national identity. Consequently, the inversion of currency by terrorist groups, as seen in the example at right, is a symbolic way of transferring the power of Western nations to the terrorists. By replacing Benjamin Franklin with Osama Bin Laden, the image seeks to symbolically argue that Osama Bin Laden and Al Qaeda have the power to undermine basic sources of American power, and turn the United States against itself.

==== People: Women ====
Woman are commonly a symbol of masculine honor, pride, and purity. They are often depicted as innocent victims that jihadi efforts need to protect from dominance and abuse by the West or other enemies. Often, women are depicted in images as innocent and helpless victims of anti-Muslim oppression, and in need of protection. The intended effect is to create a sense of anger and need to protect one's pride and honor, in order to spur the audience to anger supporting or aiding the jihadi movements. Women are also portrayed as martyrs, in order to make Muslim men feel a sense of shame and oppression that their women are forced to fight against an oppressive force. In this way, it serves to shame men into action as much as it celebrates the sacrifice of the women martyrs.

==== Weapons, Warfare, and the Afterlife: Modern Weapons ====
Modern weapons reinforce the violent nature of jihadi warfare and symbolize the use of military technology to gain power and accomplish goals. The Islamic Imagery Project argues that depictions of modern weapons often serve to exaggerate the military technology contained by jihadi groups. They also serve as symbols for modern jihadi victories, such as the defeat of the Soviet Union in Afghanistan, reminders that jihad resistance can overcome Western military dominance. Individuals pose with them to represent their association with and loyalty to the jihad movement, and helps them to construct their identities as participants in jihad. As such, they are understood as heroic symbols of participation in resistance to anti-Muslim oppression.

==== Other: Clasped Hands ====
A depiction of clasped hands symbolizes unity among the various jihadi groups and the Muslim community at large. The first example, at the right of the page, is an image published by Al Qaeda that uses handshakes to depict unity between Al Qaeda and other jihadi groups, creating a symbolic connection that ties various branches of the jihadi movement together. The clasped hands in the second example illustrate unity of the Muslim community as a whole. Each of the arms is a slightly different shade, representing the desire to bring the mission to bring the mission of specific jihad movements, which are often nation-based, to the international Muslim community.

== Symbolism of target choice ==
Terrorist acts may be considered a form of communication with victims, spectators, and the perpetrators. Attacks often are not interpreted simply as violent acts, but as statements that communicate a specific intended message. Since the rhetoric is largely non-verbal (though many terrorist attacks are followed by claims of responsibility and explanation), symbols play an important role in creating meaningful messages, and consequently become central to the mission and effectiveness of terrorism.

Targets are strategically chosen to both destroy and create symbols that communicate a desired message and create an effect on the audience. O'Hair and Heath argue that "selection of the targets of terrorism is strategic, made because of their potential rhetorical impact.” This perspective is reinforced in the book "Understanding Terrorism: Challenges, Perspectives, and Issues," in which Gus Martin argues that "terrorists select their targets because of their symbolic and propaganda value. High-profile, sentimental, or otherwise significant targets are chosen with the expectation that the target's constituency will be moved and that the victims' audience will in some way suffer." Locations are chosen because of the symbolism they already contain, and the ability of the terrorist group to manipulate this symbolism through an attack.

The symbolic choices of terrorist targets are not only meant to send isolated messages, but reflect the greater symbolic rhetoric of terrorism in general. Terrorism, it has been argued, refutes the strategy of gaining ideological victory through a single act. Instead, "the rhetorical stance of terrorism... is patient, the chipping away at the symbolic or ideological foundation of its targets.” Each target is strategically chosen to fit into the greater message.

By carefully selecting targets, terrorists use acts of destruction to both destroy and create cultural symbols that promote fear and compliance among their target audience, and that often communicate specific ideological messages. For example, in their book Terrorism: Communication and Rhetorical Perspective, O'Hair et al. describe the choice of the World Trade Center towers as a target for the 9/11 attack: "The Twin towers of the WTC stood as the very image of globalization, capitalism, and Western economic superiority... their collapse both exposed and symbolized 'the vulnerability of governmental power (Juergensemeyer, 2001, pg. 32), and the fragile nature of the dominant cultural worldview."

=== September 11th ===
The effectiveness of the World Trade Center towers as a symbol is apparent in the discussion that continues about them today. Many argue they were chosen because the towers represent American power, wealth, commerce, and materialism. Not just the activities they represent, but also their stature, made them a good target. The towers dominated the New York City skyline, making their loss, and the symbolic destruction of American commerce and power, all the more visible. Similarly, the Pentagon was a strategic target because of its symbolism as the branch of the American government which protects the country. The terrorists behind 9/11 sought to undermine these greater themes of American life by attacking the symbols that embody them.

Upon their destruction, the World Trade Center towers did not cease to exist as an important cultural symbol. In their book Defining Visual Rhetorics, Charles Hill and Margeurite Helmers discuss the revision of the symbolism of the towers upon their destruction: "Strong national symbols such as the eagle and the flag are liberally in use in the popular and mass media as a means of gathering together the imagined national community, and to these patriotic and sentimental images the twin towers of the World Trade Center have been added in the way that the red poppy came to symbolize the First World War."

=== The Oklahoma City Bombing ===
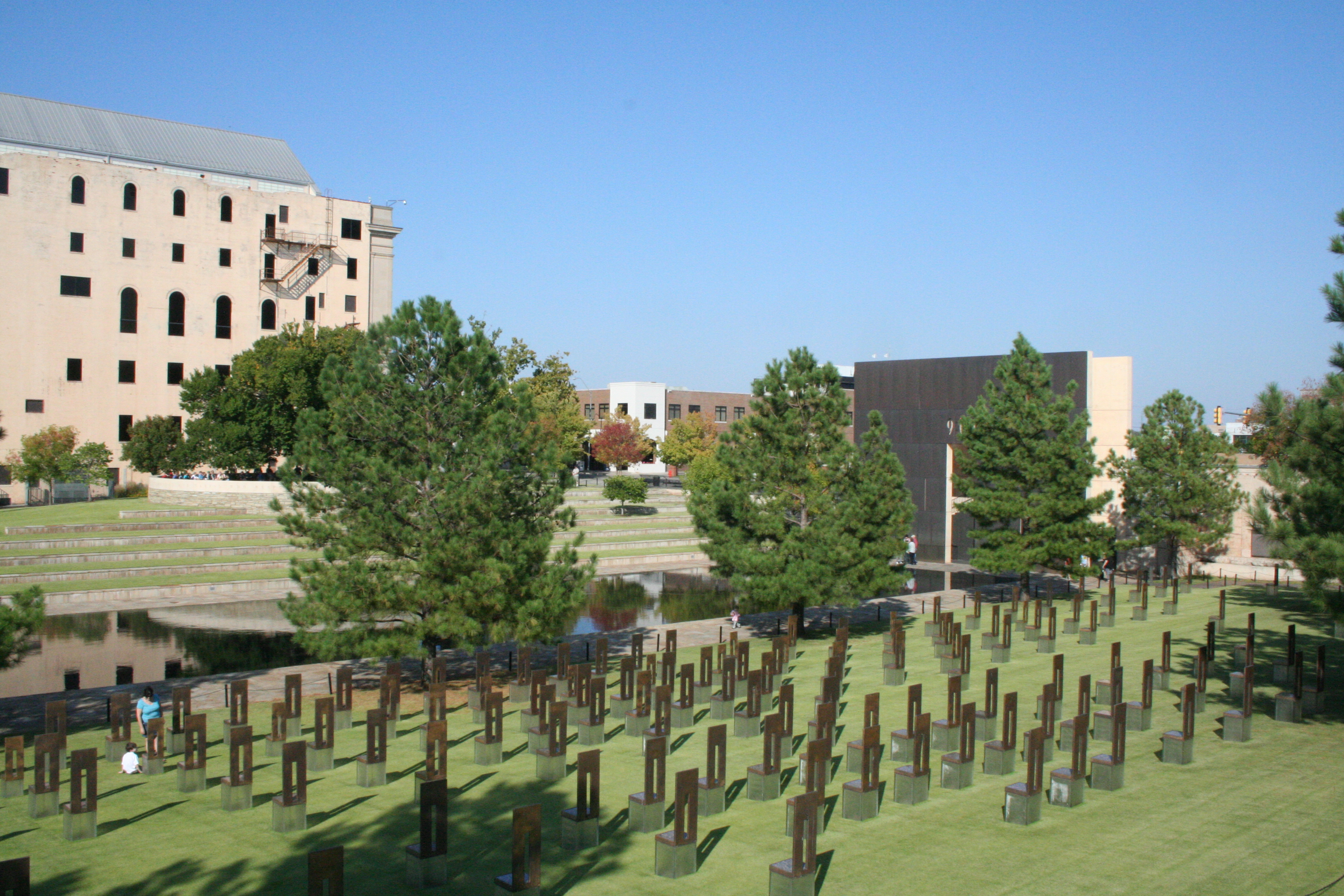
Oklahoma City National Memorial

The Oklahoma City bombing is another terrorist attack that has become highly symbolic in the American psyche. As a member of the Patriot Movement, and fearing a New World Order, the choice of the Oklahoma City Alfred P. Murrah Federal Building by Timothy McVeigh was meant to convey a message of resistance to the federal government. McVeigh sought to undermine the role of the Federal Government in society by visually destroying its presence.

Discussion of symbolism as it relates to the Oklahoma City Bombing now centers around symbols of hope, healing, and recovery. After the bombing, city planners carefully considered what to do with the remains of the building because of the importance it had to the public as a place were many were killed. Some referred to it as “sacred ground.” A memorial, called the “Outdoor Symbolic Memorial” was built on the site. Several monuments make up the memorial: the Gates of Time, which depicts “the innocence of the city before the attack… and the hope that came from the horror in the moments and days following the attack”; the Field of Empty chairs, which lies on the footprint of the building, and is made up of 168 chairs to represent each of the victims; the Survivor tree, a tree which bore the full brunt of the attack and remained standing, transforming it into “a living symbol of resilience.” Despite McVeigh's intentions to make the Alfred P. Murrah building a visual depiction of the destruction of government, it, along with the public's response to the bombing, has been transformed by the public into a symbol of recovery and healing. Though terrorism seeks to create symbols, their meaning may be changed by similarly symbolic rhetoric created by the victims of the original attack.

== The psychology of symbols ==
Psychology discusses the effect of symbols on the human mind, and gives insight into why the rhetoric of terrorism may be conducted partly through symbols. An overview of the psychology of symbols is relevant to terrorism because it is in the mind that symbols find validation and reality, allowing terrorist attacks create an effect on a wide audience.

The influence of images on humans has long been studied by art historians. David Freedberg, argues that humans react to images not simply on a cognitive level, but on an emotional one. Additionally, the psychology of persuasion has noted that if people see a symbol of authority, even if they know the groups or person projecting the symbol has no actual authority, they begin to believe that there is real authority in that party. Both of these theories contribute to arguments scholars make about the role of psychology in terrorism by helping to explain why humans react to terrorist attacks.

Psychology also contributes to the understanding of how visual propaganda put forward by terrorist groups contributes to their organization. In the book, “Psychology of Terrorism,” author Randy Borum argues that projecting an image of solidarity and power makes terrorist groups more attractive as social collectives, even if the person joining the group does not at the outset believe in its ideology. A sense of belonging is one of the primary motivating factors for people joining terrorist groups. Many symbols cited by the Islamic Imagery Project and the International Terrorist Symbols Database reference this notion of community or belonging.

== The role of the media ==
"The communications media, whether consciously or otherwise, has well served the terrorist cause. Political terrorism is now viewed as an instant means of communication and is aided and abetted by contemporary technology, utilizing the dramatic force of the mass media."

The media plays a large role in communicating information about terrorist attacks, and consequently contributes to the propagation of attacks as symbols. Through television, the internet, newspapers, and journals, the media allows the general population to witness terrorism as it occurs, which some have argued makes it iconic and creates an odd fixation on terrorism within the general population.

Terrorism is a topic that fits well into the demands of the news industry. Russell Farnen notes that, “Terrorism is different, dramatic, and potentially violent. It frequently develops over a period of time, occurs in exotic locations, offers a clear confrontation, involves bizarre characters, and is politically noteworthy. Finally, it is of concern to the public.” Some argue that the attention paid to these attacks only gives them credence and power they don't deserve: “Without massive news coverage the terrorist act would resemble the proverbial tree falling in the forest: if no one learned of an incident, it would be as if it had not occurred.”

== See also ==
- Nazi symbolism
