= Paul Richards (anthropologist) =

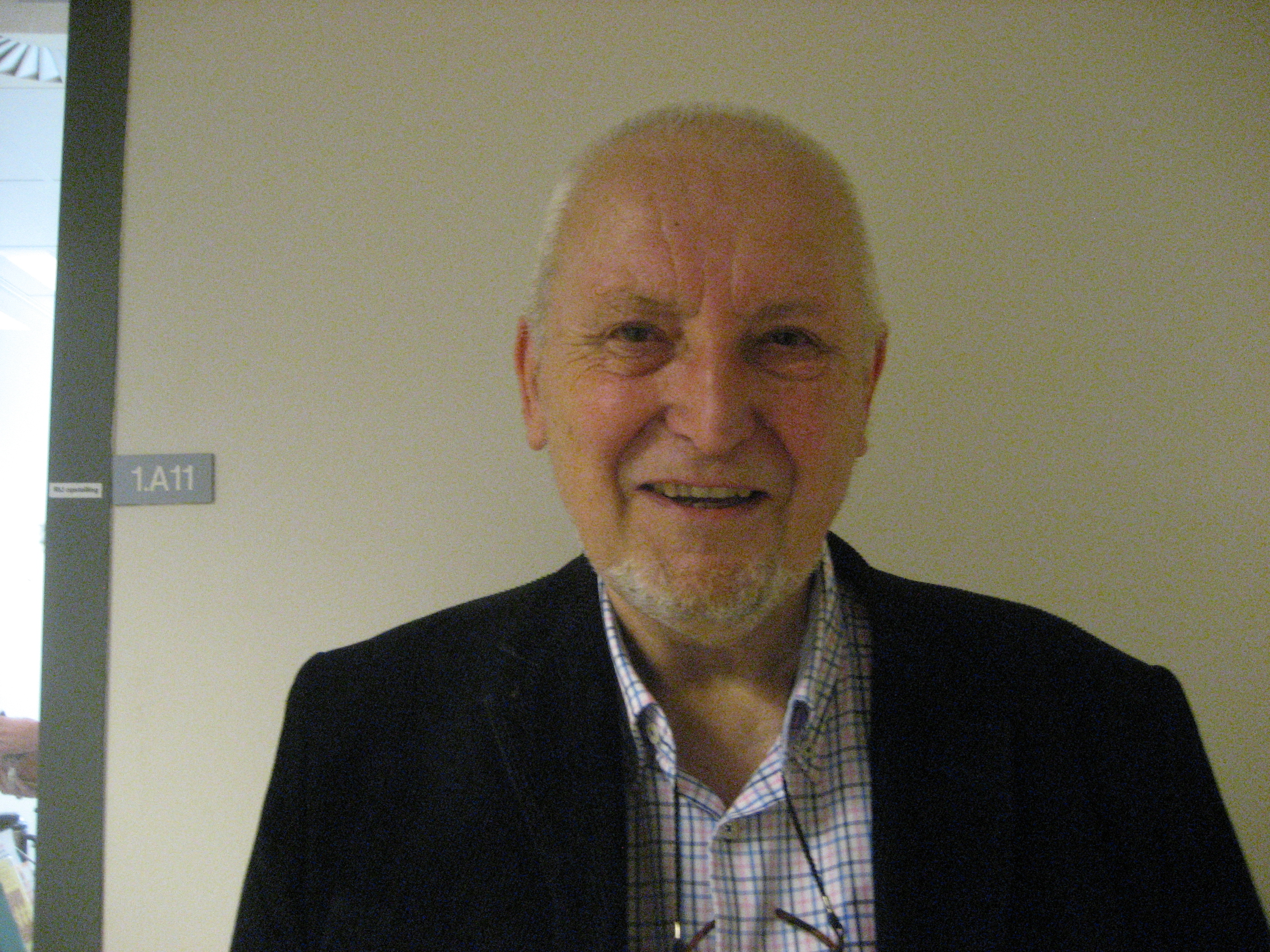
Paul Richards

Paul Richards (born 14 May 1945) is an emeritus professor of technology and agrarian development at Wageningen University, The Netherlands, and an adjunct professor at Njala University in central Sierra Leone. He was formerly a professor in the Department of Anthropology, University College London for many years, and previously taught anthropology and geography, at the School of Oriental and African Studies, and the University of Ibadan, Nigeria.

== Background ==
Richards is an anthropological commentator and researcher on agricultural technology and African farming systems. Initially trained in human geography (BSc Queen Mary University of London, 1963–1966) and African Studies (MA SOAS, 1966–1967), he taught in Ibadan, Nigeria before completing a PhD in geography and specialising in Sierra Leone (PhD London, 1973–1977). He has worked in Sierra Leone for over fifty years, conducting ethnographic studies of Mende village rice farming systems and forest conservation on the Liberian border. After the region became affected by the Sierra Leonean civil war (1992-2002), he turned to analysis of that conflict and has written more widely on the anthropology of armed conflicts, and the Ebola crisis.

== Work on agriculture ==
Richards argues, following Durkheim, that human technique and skill underpins human action and institutional change. He began by examining everyday livelihood activities like farming. He coined the term "agriculture as performance" based on years of observing the reflexivity of African farmers and their responses to stress and risks, and drawing on his own skills and interest in music and musical performance. His populist faith in African farmers to survive and prosper, despite the magnitude of the risks that faced, was set out in Indigenous Agricultural Revolution (1985), a book that generated fierce debate, since it accused agronomic research and international development organisations of missing the "moving target" of peasant farming and failing to see how innovations took place outside the realm of "formal" science and laboratories. The book's ideas were diametrically opposed to those of more pessimistic observers that lacked detailed field knowledge, that had often accused the same farmers of environmental degradation. Richards has proposed the term "technography" to describe the set of detailed research skills needed by anthropologists, and others, to understand how technology is deployed and used. Technographies have been conducted by teams including several Wageningen University research students and collaborators.

== Work on war ==
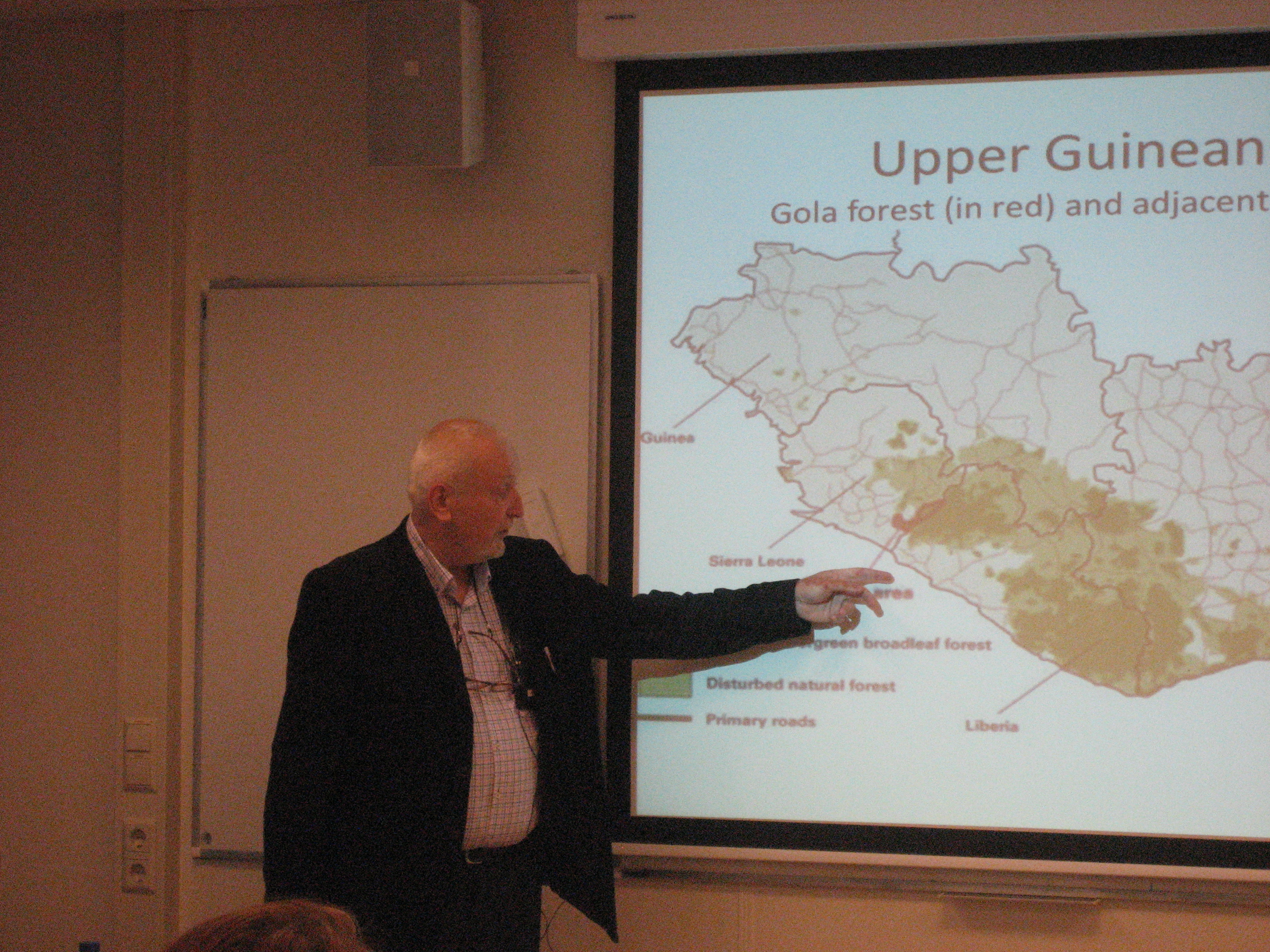
Paul Richards, lecturing in 2014

Fighting for the Rain Forest (1996) showed how the involvement of youth in Sierra Leonean rebel movements had little to do with widely perceived "barbarism" of rebel groups in resource-rich regions. War is, also, part of a "performance" with its origins in history, social orders, and human agency. Paul Richards witnessed some of the fighting during the war, continuing to visit the country. The widely held "New Barbarism" theories of Robert D. Kaplan and others had suggested abundant natural resources, like Sierra Leone's blood diamonds, were a magnet for human greed and civil conflict. Instead, Richards has argued that the involvement of youth in the Revolutionary United Front rebel movement was a form of social resistance to matriarchal rule in Sierra Leone, did not appear to have a strong underlying motive of greed (for the diamond revenues), and was a considered response rather than a spontaneous, 'barbaric' movement. Grievances were partly responsible for the violence that undoubtedly did afflict Sierra Leone during its civil war and for which the Revolutionary United Front was partly responsible. Richards has advised aid and humanitarian agencies on African post-war reconstruction, demobilization and skills-training.

== Published work ==
=== Books ===
- Richards, P. (ed.) 1975. African Environment: Problems and Perspectives. London: International African Institute.
- Richards, P. 1985. Indigenous Agricultural Revolution. Ecology and Food Crops in West Africa. Methuen.
- Richards, P. 1986. Coping with hunger. Hazard and Experiment in a West African Rice Farming System. London: UCL Press.
- Last, M., P. Richards, C. Fyfe. 1987. Sierra Leone, 1787-1987: two centuries of intellectual life. Manchester University Press. [Africa 57(4)]
- Richards, P. 1996. Fighting for the Rain Forest. War, Youth & Resources in Sierra Leone. Oxford: James Currey.
- Richards, P. & Ruivenkamp, G. 1997. Seeds and Survival. Crop Genetic Resources in War and Reconstruction in Africa. Rome: IPGRI.
- Richards, P. (ed.) 2005. No Peace, No War. An Anthropology of Contemporary Armed Conflicts. Oxford: James Currey.
- Richards, P. 2016. Ebola: How a People's Science Helped End an Epidemic. London: Zed Books.
- Richards, P. and Perri 6. 2017. Mary Douglas: Understanding social thought and conflict. New York: Berghahn Books.
- E. Bulte, P. Richards and M.Voors. 2018. Institutions and Agrarian Development: A New Approach to West Africa. Palgrave Macmillan/Springer. https://doi.org/10.1007/978-3-319-98500-8
- Richards, P. and Perri 6. 2023. Mary Douglas. Berghahn Books. https://doi.org/10.3167/9781800739796

=== Articles and book chapters (incomplete) ===
- High, C., & P. Richards. 1972. "The random walk drainage simulation model as a teaching exercise", Journal of Geography 71(1), 41–51.
- Richards, P. 1972. "A quantitative analysis of the relationship between language tone and melody in a Hausa song". African Language Studies 13, 137-161
- High, C., J. Oguntoyinbo and P. Richards. 1973. "Rainfall, drought and food supply in South-Western Nigeria". Savanna, 2(2), 115–120.
- Richards, P. 1974. "Kant’s geography and mental maps". Transactions of the Institute of British Geographers 61, 1–16.
- Richards, P. 1975. "'Alternative' strategies for the African environment: folk ecology as a basis for community oriented agricultural development". In: P. Richards, Editor, African Environment: Problems and Perspectives, IAI, London.
- Filani, M. O. and P. Richards. 1976. "Periodic market systems and rural development: the Ibarapa case study". Savanna 5(2), 149–162.
- Oguntoyinbo, J. S., and P. Richards. 1977. "The extent and intensity of the 1969-1973 drought in Nigeria: a provisional analysis". In: D. Dalby, R.J. Harrison Church & F. Bezzaz. Drought in Africa, International African Institute London, pp. 114–126.
- Otuntoyinbo, J., and P. Richards. 1978. "Drought and the Nigerian farmer". Journal of Arid Environments 1:165–194.
- Richards, P. 1978. "Problem-generating structures in Nigeria's rural development". African Affairs 77(307), 257–259.
- Richards, P. 1978. "Environment, settlement and state formation in pre-colonial Nigeria". In: Green, D. R., Haselgrove, C., and M. Spriggs (eds). Social Organisation and Settlement: Contributions from Anthropology, Archaeology and Geography. British Archaeological Reports, Oxford.
- Richards, P. 1979. "A Green Revolution in Africa?" African Affairs 78(311), 269–272.
- Richards, P. 1979. "Community Environmental Knowledge in African Rural Development". IDS Bulletin, 10 (2).
- Richards, P. 1980. "The environmental factor in African studies". Progress in Human Geography. 4(4), 589–60.
- Richards, P. 1980. "Community environmental knowledge in African rural development". In Indigenous Knowledge Systems and Development, eds D. W. Brokensha, D. M. Warren, and O. Werner, pp. 183–203. Lanham, Maryland: University Press of America.
- Richards, P. 1981. "Quality and quantity in agricultural work-Sierra Leone rice farming systems". In: G. A. Harrison. Energy and Effort. London : Taylor & Francis.
- Richards, P. 1983. "Farming systems and agrarian change in West Africa". Progress in Human Geography 7(1), 1–39.
- Richards, P. 1983. "Ecological change and the politics of African land use". African Studies Review 26(2), 1-72.
- Richards, P. 1984. "Spatial organization as a theme in African studies". Progress in Human Geography 8, 551–561.
- Richards, P. 1985. "Farmers also experiment: a neglected intellectual resource in African science". Discovery and Innovation 1, pp. 19–25.
- Richards, P. 1987. "The politics of famine—Some recent literature". African Affairs 86, 111–116.
- Richards, P. 1987. "Africa in the music of Samuel Coleridge-Taylor". Africa 57(4), 566-571
- Richards, P. 1987. "Upland and swamp rice farming systems in Sierra Leone: an evolutionary transition?" In: B. L. Turner II and S. B. Brush (eds). Comparative Farming Systems. Guilford Press. pp. 156–187.
- Richards, P. 1989. "Doing what comes naturally: ecological inventiveness in African rice farming". In: R. E. Johannes (ed.). Traditional Ecological Knowledge: A Collection of Essays, IUCN, 51–56.
- Richards, P. 1989. "Agriculture as a performance". In R. Chambers, A. Pacey and L. Thrupp (eds), Farmer First: Farmer Innovation and Agricultural Research. London: Intermediate Technology, pp. 39–42.
- Richards, P. 1990. "Local strategies for coping with hunger: central Sierra Leone and northern Nigeria compared". African Affairs 89(355), 265–275.
- Richards, P. 1992. "Saving the rainforest? Contested futures in conservation". In: S. Wallman. Contemporary futures: Perspectives from Social Anthropology.
- Richards, P. 1992. "Landscapes of dissent: Ikale and Ikaje country, 1870-1950". In: J. F. Aye Ayadi and J. D. Y. Peel. People and Empires in African History: Essays in Memory of Michael Crowder. Longman, London.
- Richards, P. 1993. "Cultivation: knowledge or performance?" In Hobart, M. (ed). An Anthropological Critique of Development: the Growth of Ignorance. London, Routledge, 61–78
- Richards, P. 1993. "Natural symbols and natural history: Chimpanzees, elephants and experiments in Mende thought". In: K. Milton (ed.). Environmentalism: The View from Anthropology. Routledge.
- Richards, P. 1995. "Rebellion in Liberia and Sierra Leone: a crisis of youth?" In: O.W. Furley (ed.). Conflict in Africa, I.B. Tauris: London.
- Richards, P. 1995. "The versatility of the poor: indigenous wetland management systems in Sierra Leone". GeoJournal 35(2), 197–203.
- Richards, P. 1995. "Participatory Rural Appraisal: a quick and dirty critique". PLA Notes. 24, 13–16.
- Richards, P., J. Guyer. 1996. "The invention of biodiversity: social perspectives on the management of biological variety in Africa". Africa 66(1).
- Richards, P. 1996. "Culture and community values in the selection and maintenance of African rice". In: S. Brush & Doreen Stabinsky, eds, Valuing Local Knowledge: indigenous people and intellectual property rights. Island Press, Washington DC.
- Richards, P., & G. Ruivenkamp. 1996. "New tools for conviviality: social shaping of biotechnology". In: P. Descola & G. Palsson, eds. Nature and Society: anthropological perspectives.
- Richards, P. 1996. "Agrarian creolization: the ethnobiology, history, culture and politics of West African rice". In: R. Ellen and K. Fukui, eds. Redefining Nature: Ecology, culture and domestication, 291–318.
- Richards. P. 1997. "Toward an African Green Revolution?: An Anthropology of Rice Research in Sierra Leone". In E. Nyerges, ed., The Ecology of Practice: Studies of Food Crop Production in Sub-Saharan West Africa. Newark: Gordon & Breach.
- Peters, K., & P. Richards. 1998. "Why we fight: Voices of youth combatants in Sierra Leone". Africa 68(2), 183–210.
- Peters, K., & P. Richards. 1998. "Jeunes combattants parlant de la guerre et de la paix en Sierra Leone", Cahiers d'Etudes africaines, 150–152, 581–617.
- Richards, P. 1999. "New political violence in Africa: secular sectarianism in Sierra Leone". GeoJournal 47, 433–442.
- Richards, P. 1999. "Casting seeds to the four winds: a modest proposal for plant genetic diversity management", in Posey, D. A. (ed.), Cultural and Spiritual Values of Biodiversity, Nairobi & London: UNEP & IT Publications.
- Richards, P. 2000. "Chimpanzees as political animals in Sierra Leone". In J. Knight, Natural Enemies: People-wildlife Conflicts in Anthropological Perspective. Routledge.
- Richards, P. "A Pan-African Composer? Coleridge-Taylor and Africa". Black Music Research Journal 21(),
- Archibald, S., & P. Richards. 2002. "Converts to human rights? Popular debate about war and justice in rural central Sierra Leone". Africa 72(3), 339–367.
- Richards, P., and C. Vlassenroot. 2002. "Les guerres africaines du type fleuve Mano: pour une analyse sociale". Politique Africaine 88, 13–26.
- Richards. P. 2002. "Green Book Millenarians? The Sierra Leone War from the Perspective of an Anthropology of Religion". In Niels Kastfelt, ed., Religion and Civil War in Africa, London: C. Hurst.
- Archibald, S., & P. Richards. 2002. "Seeds and rights: new approaches to post-war agricultural rehabilitation in Sierra Leone". Disasters 26(4, 356–67.
- Richards, P. 2002. "Militia conscription in Sierra Leone: recruitment of young fighters in an African war". Comparative Social Research 20, 255–276.
- Richards, P. 2005. "War as smoke and mirrors: Sierra Leone 1991-2, 1994-5, 1995-6". Anthropological Quarterly 78(2), 377–402.
- Richards, P. 2006. "An accidental sect: How war made belief in Sierra Leone". Review of African Political Economy 33(110), 651 - 663.
- Richards, P. 2006. "The history and future of African rice. Food security and survival in a West African war zone". Afrika Spectrum 41(1), 77–93.
- Richards, P. 2006. "Young men and gender in war and post-war reconstruction: some comparative findings from Liberia and Sierra Leone". In I. Bannon and Maria Correia, eds, The Other Half of Gender: men’s issues in development, Washington: World Bank, pp. 195–218.
- Richards, P. 2007. "How does participation work? Deliberation and performance in African food security". IDS Bulletin 38(5), 21–35.
- Richards, P. 2007. "The emotions at war: a musicological approach to understanding atrocity in Sierra Leone". In Perri 6, S. Radstone, C. Squire & A. Treacher (eds), Public emotions. Basingstoke: Palgrave.
- Peters, K., & P. Richards. 2007. "Understanding recent African wars", Africa 77(3), 442–454.
- Richards, P. 2007. "Is a right to technology an antidote to war?" In G. Frerks & B. Goldwijk (eds) New Human Security Challenges: alternative discourses. Wageningen: Wageningen University Press.
- Richards, P., M. Rizzo, M. L. Weiss, C. Steinerd & S. England. 2010. "Do Peasants Need GM Crops?" (review), Journal of Peasant Studies 37(3): 559-574
- Richards, P. 2010. "Ritual dynamics in humanitarian assistance". Disasters 34: 138–146
- Richards, P. 2010. A Green Revolution from below? Retirement address, Wageningen University.
- Krijn, P., P. Richards. 2011. "Rebellion and Agrarian Tensions in Sierra Leone". Journal of Agrarian Change 11(3):377-395
- Cramer, C., and P. Richards. 2011. "Violence and War in Agrarian Perspective". Journal of Agrarian Change 11 (3): 277-297
- Mokuwa E., M. Voors, E. Bulte and P. Richards. 2011. "Peasant grievance and insurgency in Sierra Leone: Judicial serfdom as a driver of conflict". African Affairs 110(440): 339–366.
- Nuijten E., & P. Richards. 2011. "Pollen flows within and between rice and millet fields in relation to farmer variety development in The Gambia". Plant Genetic Resources 9 :361-374.
- Mokuwa, A., Nuijten, H.A.C.P., Okry, F., Teeken, B.W.E., Maat, H., Richards, P. and Struik, P.C. 2013. Robustness and Strategies of Adaptation among Farmer Varieties of African Rice (Oryza glaberrima) and Asian Rice (Oryza sativa) across West Africa. PLoS One 8 (2013)3.
- Grijspaarde, H., Voors, M., Bulte, E., and Richards, P. 2013. Who believes in witches? Institutional flux in Sierra Leone. African Affairs 112/446: 22–47.
