= Davis–Moore hypothesis =

Claim in structural functionalism

The Davis–Moore hypothesis, sometimes referred to as the Davis–Moore theory, is a central claim within the structural functionalist paradigm of sociological theory, and was advanced by Kingsley Davis and Wilbert E. Moore in a paper published in 1945. The hypothesis is an attempt to explain social stratification. As a structural functionalist theory, it is also associated with Talcott Parsons and Robert K. Merton.

== Argument ==
The hypothesis is an attempted explanation of social stratification, based on the idea of "functional necessity". Davis and Moore argue that the most difficult jobs in any society are the most necessary and require the highest rewards and compensation to sufficiently motivate individuals to fill them. Once the roles are filled, the division of labour functions properly, based on the notion of organic solidarity advanced by Emile Durkheim.

== Criticism ==
This argument has been criticized as fallacious from a number of different angles. The first criticism is that they position rewards as a guarantee of performance, when rewards are supposed to be based on merit in their argument. It is argued that if abilities were inherent, there would be no need of a reward system. Others have argued that Davis and Moore do not clearly indicate why some positions should be worth more than others, other than the fact that they are remunerated more, claiming, for example, that teachers are equally, if not more, functionally necessary than athletes and movie stars, yet, they receive significantly lower incomes. These critics have suggested that structural inequality (inherited wealth, family power, etc.), is itself a cause of individual success or failure, rather than a consequence of it. Class analysts point out that it is not merely income that determines inequality but wealth, access to social networks, and cultural practices that put some individuals in better positions than others to succeed.

== See also ==
- Scientific theory
