= Sociology of peace, war, and social conflict =

The sociological study of peace, war, and social conflict uses sociological theory and methods to analyze group conflicts, especially collective violence and alternative constructive nonviolent forms of conflict transformation. Its concepts have been applied to current wars (such as the War in Ukraine) and John D. Brewer notes that ordinary people, as opposed to politicians, can promote peace in post-conflict situations, based on ethics and "moral duty".

The by-laws of the Section on Peace, War and Social Conflict of the American Sociological Association specify:

The purpose of the Section on Peace, War, and Social Conflict is to foster the development and application of sociological theories and methods for the understanding and study of dynamics of collective conflict and its prevention, conduct, and resolution. Included is the study of military institutions and conflict between collectivities such as countries, ethnic groups, political movements, and religious groups. Also included are the roles of military organizations, other governmental organizations, non-governmental organizations, and social movements.

== See also ==
- Amity-enmity complex
- Bandwagon effect
- Failed state
- Groupthink
- Ideocracy
- Peace and conflict studies
- Power politics
- Power Politics (Wight book)
- Military sociology
- Sociology of terrorism
- Societal collapse
- State collapse
- The true believer
- The anatomy of revolution
