= Social conflict =

Struggle for agency or power in society

Social conflict is the struggle for agency or power in society. Social conflict occurs when two or more people oppose each other in social interaction, and each exerts social power with reciprocity in an effort to achieve incompatible goals but prevent the other from attaining their own. It is a social relationship in which action is intentionally oriented to carry out the actor's own will despite the resistance of others.

== Conflict theory ==
Conflict theory emphasizes interests, rather than norms and values, in conflict. The pursuit of interests generates various types of conflict, which is thus seen as a normal aspect of social life, rather than an abnormal occurrence. Competition over resources is often the cause of conflict. The theory has three tenets:

- Society is composed of different groups, which compete for resources.
- Societies may portray a sense of co-operation, but there is a continual power struggle between social groups as they pursue their own interests. Within societies, certain groups control specific resources and means of production.
- Social groups will use resources to their own advantage in the pursuit of their goals and often take advantage of those who lack control over resources. As a result, many dominated groups will struggle with other groups in an attempt to gain control. Most of the time, the groups with the most resources will gain or maintain power since they have the resources to support their power. The idea that those who have control will maintain control is known as the Matthew effect.

One branch of conflict theory is critical criminology, a term based upon the view that the fundamental cause of crime is oppression, which results from social and economic forces operating within a given society. The perspective stems from the German philosopher Karl Marx, who viewed the justice system and the laws to favour the rich and the powerful in a society and for the poor to be punished far more severely for much smaller crimes.

== Karl Marx ==
In his Critique of the Political Economy, Karl Marx noted:

In the social production of their existence, men inevitably enter into definite relations, which are independent of their will, namely the economic structure of society, the real foundation, on which arises a legal and political superstructure and to which correspond definite forms of social consciousness. The mode of production of material life conditions the general process of social, political and intellectual life. It is not the consciousness of men that determines their existence, but their social existence that determines their consciousness. At some stage of development, the material productive forces of society come into conflict with the existing relations of production or – this merely expresses the same thing in legal terms – with the property relations within the framework of which they have operated hitherto. From forms of development of the productive forces these relations turn into their fetters (legcuffs). Then begins an era of social revolution. The changes in the economic foundation lead sooner or later to the transformation of the whole immense superstructure.

In studying such transformations it is always necessary to distinguish between the material transformation of the economic conditions of production, which can be determined with the precision of natural science, and the legal, political, religious, artistic or philosophic – in short, ideological forms in which men become conscious of this conflict and fight it out. Just as one does not judge an individual by what he thinks about himself, so one cannot judge such a period of transformation by its consciousness, but, on the contrary, this consciousness must be explained from the contradictions of material life, from the conflict existing between the social forces of production and the relations of production. No social order is ever destroyed before all the productive forces for which it is sufficient to have been developed, and new superior relations of production never replace older ones before the material conditions for their existence have matured within the framework of the old society.

Mankind thus inevitably sets itself only such tasks as it is able to solve since closer examination will always show that the problem itself arises only when the material conditions for its solution are already present or at least in the course of formation. In broad outline, the Asiatic, ancient, feudal and modern bourgeois modes of production may be designated as epochs marking progress in the economic development of society. The bourgeois mode of production is the last antagonistic form of the social process of production – antagonistic not in the sense of individual antagonism but of an antagonism that emanates from the individuals' social conditions of existence – but the productive forces developing within bourgeois society create also the material conditions for a solution of this antagonism. The prehistory of human society accordingly closes with this social formation.

Marx, a German revolutionary, emphasized his materialist views on ownership and means of production. He argued that what is most valued is a result of human labour, and he founded his ideas based on a capitalistic community, with most money being owned by only a few people. That causes a distinction between the class of the industrialists and that of the working class. The few industrialists own the means of production. The working class earns wages by selling its labour. Problems become noticeable because the upper class wants to get the most production for the least money. Surplus value is created, which the profit held onto by the industrialists from by workers producing more than the employers actually need to repay the cost of hiring labourers. Another occurrence is exploitation, which is workers receiving less money than the worth of their labour. Marx believed that the gap between industrialists and the labourers would continue to grow. The industrialists would continue to become more wealthy, and the labourers would continue to become poorer. Conflict theory is seen throughout relationships and interactions between two groups of people including races, opposite sexes, and religions.

Max Weber and Karl Marx have two different approaches to the conflict theory. Marx supported the ideas of deviance and claimed that individuals choose to engage in such rebellious and conflicting behaviour as a response to the inequalities of the capitalist system. Weber discussed the conflict of stratification and its effects on power in society and stressed property, prestige, and power to be the main influences to the conflicting behaviours of groups in society.

Marx argued: "The worker becomes all the poorer the more wealth he produces, the more his production increases in power and range. The worker becomes an ever cheaper commodity the more commodities he creates. With the increasing value of the world of things proceeds in direct proportion to the devaluation of the world of men. Labour produces not only commodities; it produces itself and the worker as a commodity -- and does so in the proportion in which it produces commodities generally."

A commodity is a social use value produced by its owner not for personal consumption but for exchange. Marx believed that an entrepreneur must keep up with more things as his company and power expand. That becomes more difficult each time his range of power increases. Eventually, he will become a commodity by no longer being able to keep up with the business and will have to put it up for sale on the market.

== Other scholars ==
Lewis A. Coser disagrees with most other American sociologists and contends that they have badly neglected and misunderstood the concept and function of social conflict. He defines social conflict as "a struggle over the values and claims to scarce status, power and resources in which the aims of the opponents are to neutralize, injure, or eliminate their rivals".

Here are some types of social conflict:

- conflict involving social positions
- conflict of interest
- role conflict, which involve social roles

== See also ==
- Cultural conflict – Clash of beliefs or values
- Environmental conflict – Social conflict caused by environmental factors
- Organizational conflict – Intra-organizational discord
- Social conflict theory – Marxist criminological theory
- Social determinants of health – Economic and social conditions that influence differences in health status
- Social determinants of health in poverty – Factors that affect impoverished populations' health and health inequality
- Social determinants of mental health – Societal problems that disrupt mental health
- Sociology of peace, war, and social conflict
- Sociology of revolution – 1925 book by Pitirim Sorokin
- Socionics – Pseudoscientific personality theory
