= List of noctuid genera: X =

The huge moth family Noctuidae contains the following genera:

A B C D E F G H I J K L M N O P Q R S T U V W X Y Z

- Xandria
- Xanthanomis
- Xanthia
- Xanthiria
- Xanthirinopsis
- Xanthocosmia
- Xanthodesma
- Xanthograpta
- Xantholepis
- Xanthomera
- Xanthomixis
- Xanthopastis
- Xanthospilopteryx
- Xanthostha
- Xanthothrix
- Xenapamea
- Xenopachnobia
- Xenophysa
- Xenopseustis
- Xenotrachea
- Xerociris
- Xestia
- Xiana
- Xipholeucania
- Xoria
- Xylena
- Xylinissa
- Xyliodes
- Xylis
- Xylocampa
- Xylomania
- Xylomoia
- Xylophylla
- Xylopolia
- Xylormisa
- Xylostola
- Xylotype
- Xymehops
- Xystopeplus
