= Xandria (disambiguation) =

Xandria is a German symphonic metal band.

Xandria may also refer to:

- Xandria (moth), an insect genus
- Xandria Ooi, a Malaysian writer and television host
- Xandria Phillips, a U.S. poet and artist
- XandriaCollection, a website selling erotica and pornography

== See also ==
- Alexandria (disambiguation)
- Alexandra (disambiguation)
- Alexander (disambiguation)
- Sandra (disambiguation)
- Zander (disambiguation)
