= Beate Uhse-Rotermund =

German pilot and sex shop entrepreneur

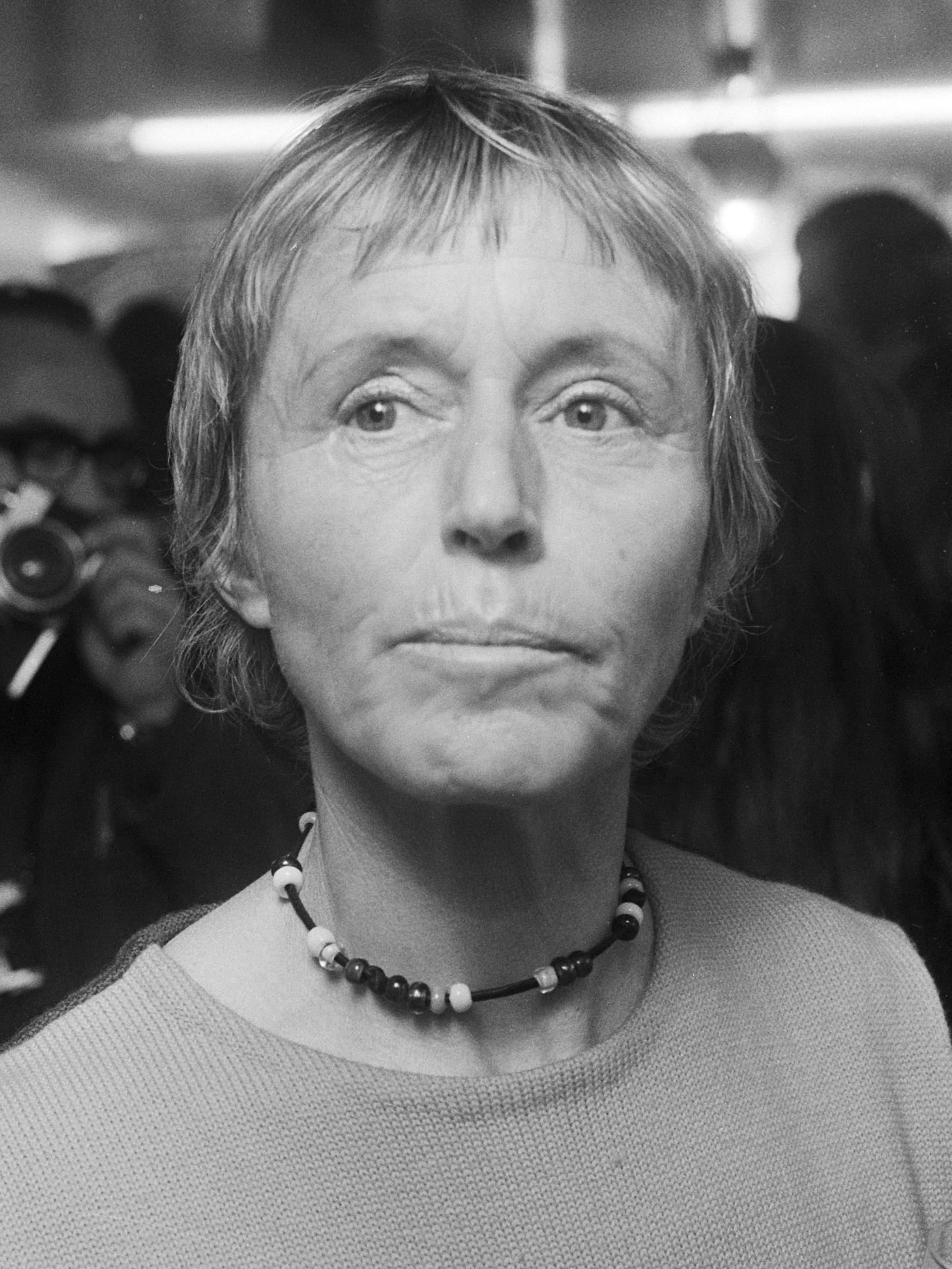
- Uhse in 1971
- Born: Beate Köstlin; 25 October 1919; Wargenau, East Prussia
- Died: 16 July 2001 (aged 81); St. Gallen, Switzerland
- Occupation: Entrepreneur
- Military career
- Branch: Luftwaffe
- Service years: 1939–1945
- Rank: Hauptmann
- Unit: Überführungsgeschwader 1
- Conflicts: World War II

Beate Uhse-Rotermund (German pronunciation: [beˈaːtə ˈʔuːzə ˈʁoːtɐmʊnt]; born Beate Köstlin [ˈkœstliːn], 25 October 1919 – 16 July 2001) was a German pilot, entrepreneur and sex shop pioneer. She was one of a number of female stunt pilots in Germany in the 1930s. During World War II she ferried planes for the German Luftwaffe and after World War II she started a sex shop. The company she started, Beate Uhse AG, is listed on the Frankfurt Stock Exchange.

== Early life ==
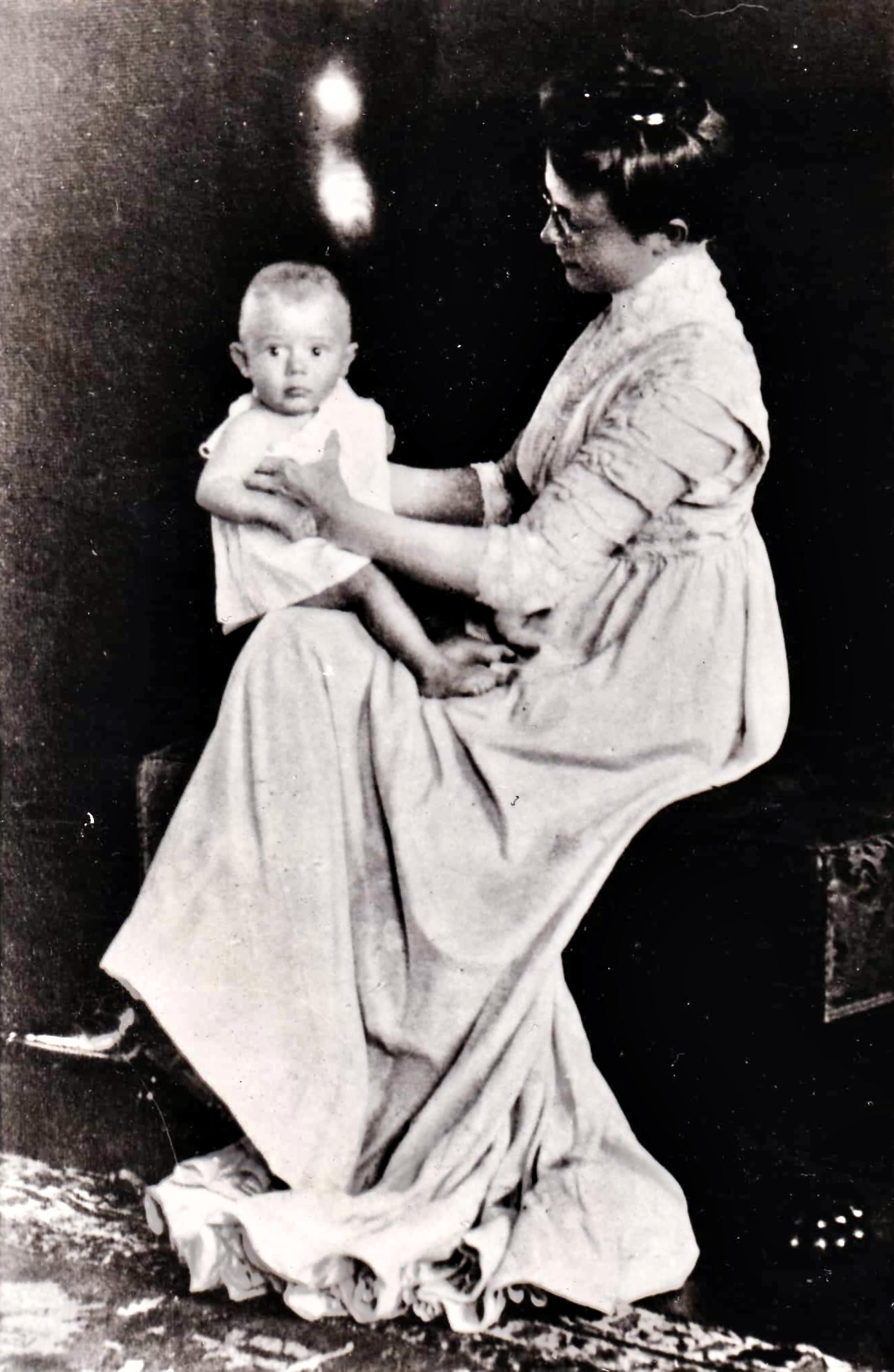
Beate with her mother Margarethe Koestlin

Beate Dorothea Köstlin was born in Wargenau, a neighbourhood of Cranz, East Prussia (now Zelenogradsk, Russia). She was the youngest of three children of doctor Margarete Köstlin-Räntsch, (one of the first five female doctors in Germany) and farmer Otto Köstlin.

When she was eight years old, her older brother told her the myth of Icarus. Beate was fascinated by the story, and by the idea of flying—so much so that she gathered chicken feathers and glued together some wings and jumped from her parents' veranda. Beate was a wild child. Her parents did not try to control her; instead they encouraged their daughter in her interests and desires. They ensured she got a good education at progressive boarding schools, first "Schule am Meer" then "Odenwaldschule" where she graduated. Her parents informed their children about sexual matters early, and spoke with them openly about sexuality and contraception. At 15, Beate became the Hessian javelin champion.

== Civil aviation ==
At 16, Beate Köstlin went to England for a year to learn English as an au pair. Afterwards, she returned home where, to satisfy her parents, she earned a "proper" education (in Home Economics). During a trip to Berlin, her father met a Mr. Sachsenberg, a lecturer on motor sports from the German Aero-Club (a nonprofit organisation dedicated to flying), and complained to him of his "flying-crazy" daughter and the "nonsensical" concept of a female pilot. Sachsenberg was, instead, excited by the idea, and sent the seventeen-year-old Beate information about how to obtain a pilot's license.

Her parents eventually gave in to her demands to learn to fly, and in 1937 she joined the Rangsdorf pilot school near Berlin. In October of that year, on her 18th birthday, she earned her pilot's license. In 1938, she passed the stunt pilot exam, and shortly after competed in a race in Belgium. She won in her category, and also won 2nd place overall in target landing and 3rd in "punctual flight".

She then worked for the Bücker aircraft company in Rangsdorf as a Flugkapitän (test pilot) and then, at age 19, as a delivery pilot for the Alfred Friedrich (Pilot) aircraft concern in Strausberg, east of Berlin. Soon afterwards, she was asked by the UFA film company to work as a stunt double in films. She worked with Hans Albers, a film star she particularly admired, and with numerous others. In the German propaganda movie German: Achtung! Feind hört mit! (Attention! Enemy is listening), she performed a stunt as a double for German actor René Deltgen, in which she flew through a balloon barrier and simulated an uncontrolled dive.

Beate fell in love with her stunt-piloting instructor, Hans-Jürgen Uhse (1908-1944), a member of a Prussian Junker military family, and brother of Bodo Uhse. She repeatedly rejected Hans-Jürgen proposals of marriage and swore she would "never ever give up flying for a man". As Hans-Jürgen strongly supported her flying ambitions, she finally accepted, but her father resisted. For a whole year, her father refused to bless their union. Finally, a large wedding was scheduled for 10 October 1939. However, it had to be cancelled because of the beginning of the Second World War. On 28 September, Hans-Jürgen Uhse was posted to his military destination; the couple married quietly four hours before his departure.

== Luftwaffe transport pilot ==
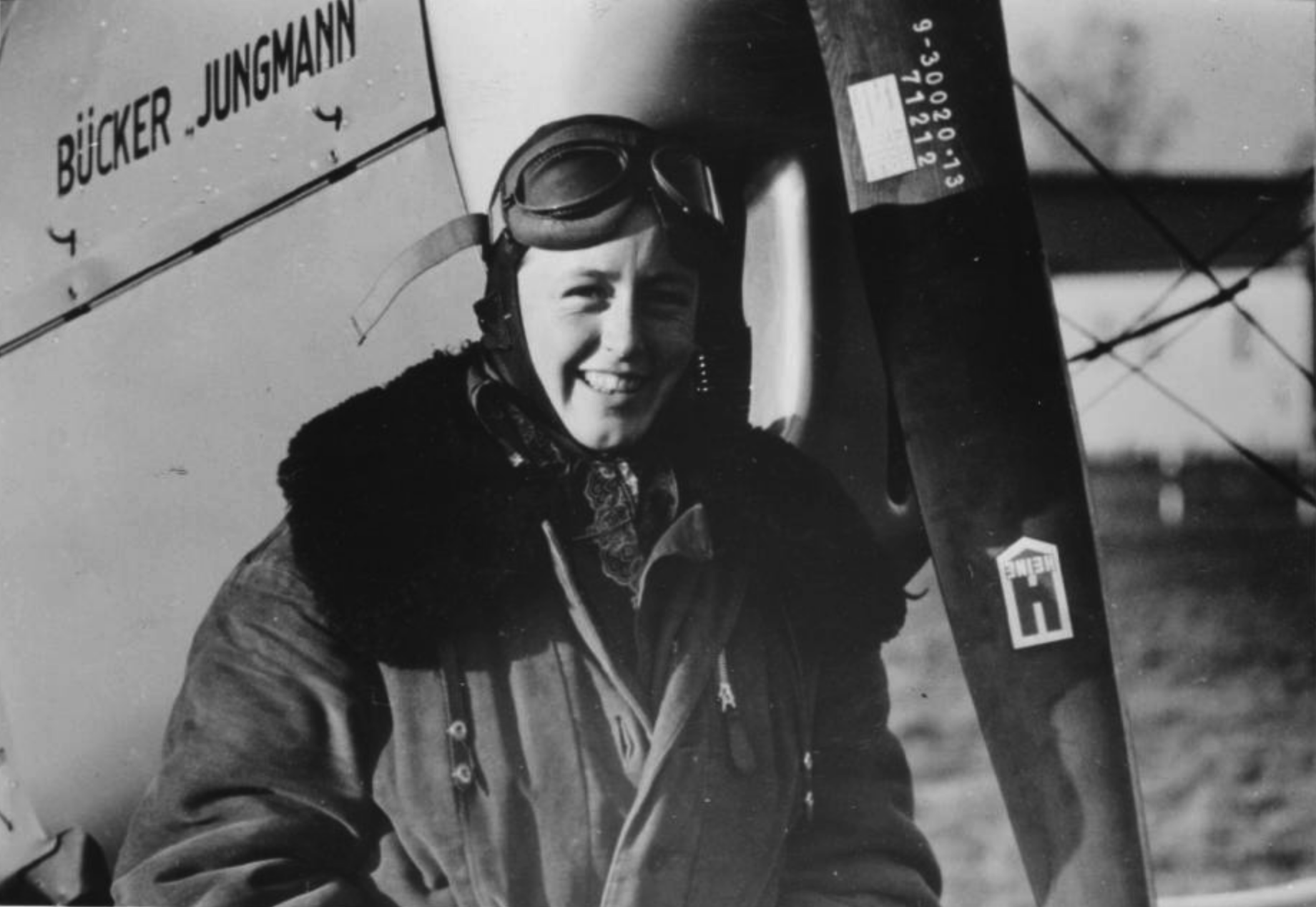
Beate serving as a test pilot, in front of a Bücker Bü 131 Jungmann in 1937

During the war, stunt piloting became impossible and Beate Uhse was grounded. In her small home in Rangsdorf, she felt claustrophobic, so she accepted an offer by the Luftwaffe to work in an aircraft ferrying unit. This meant that she was occasionally able to fly combat aircraft that she would otherwise not be allowed access to: the Junkers Ju 87 Stuka, the Messerschmitt Bf 109 and 110, the Focke-Wulf Fw 190 and at the end of the war even the Messerschmitt Me 262, the world's first operational jet fighter. Although attacked several times by allied aircraft she continued to fly, as she felt that after the war, with this experience, she would be able to have a career as a pilot.

In 1943, her son Klaus was born. After the birth, she was permitted to continue flying because she was in a role considered vital to the war effort, and she received permission to hire a nanny.

In October 1944, she was promoted to the rank of captain and was assigned to Ferry Wing 1 (German: Überführungsgeschwader 1) based in Berlin-Staaken.

On 30 May 1944, her husband Hans-Jürgen Uhse died in an air crash, leaving Beate a 24-year-old widow with a year-old son.

In April 1945, Berlin was surrounded by Soviet forces. The commander of Uhse's squadron wanted to move the battalion west. Uhse made her way through the ravaged city to her house in Rangsdorf and picked up her son and his nanny, but when she brought them to the airport, her unit had already left, along with her plane. She found a small Siebel Fh 104 plane that did not have a pilot, and while it was being fueled she studied the plane's manual, as she had never flown this type of aircraft. With her son and the nanny, together with four other passengers, two of whom were injured, she left embattled Berlin flying northwest, finally landing in Leck in North Friesland.

There she was captured by British forces. After her release, she settled in Flensburg, in what would become West Germany, with her son.

She later discovered that her parents had been murdered by the Red Army in 1945.

== Businesswoman ==
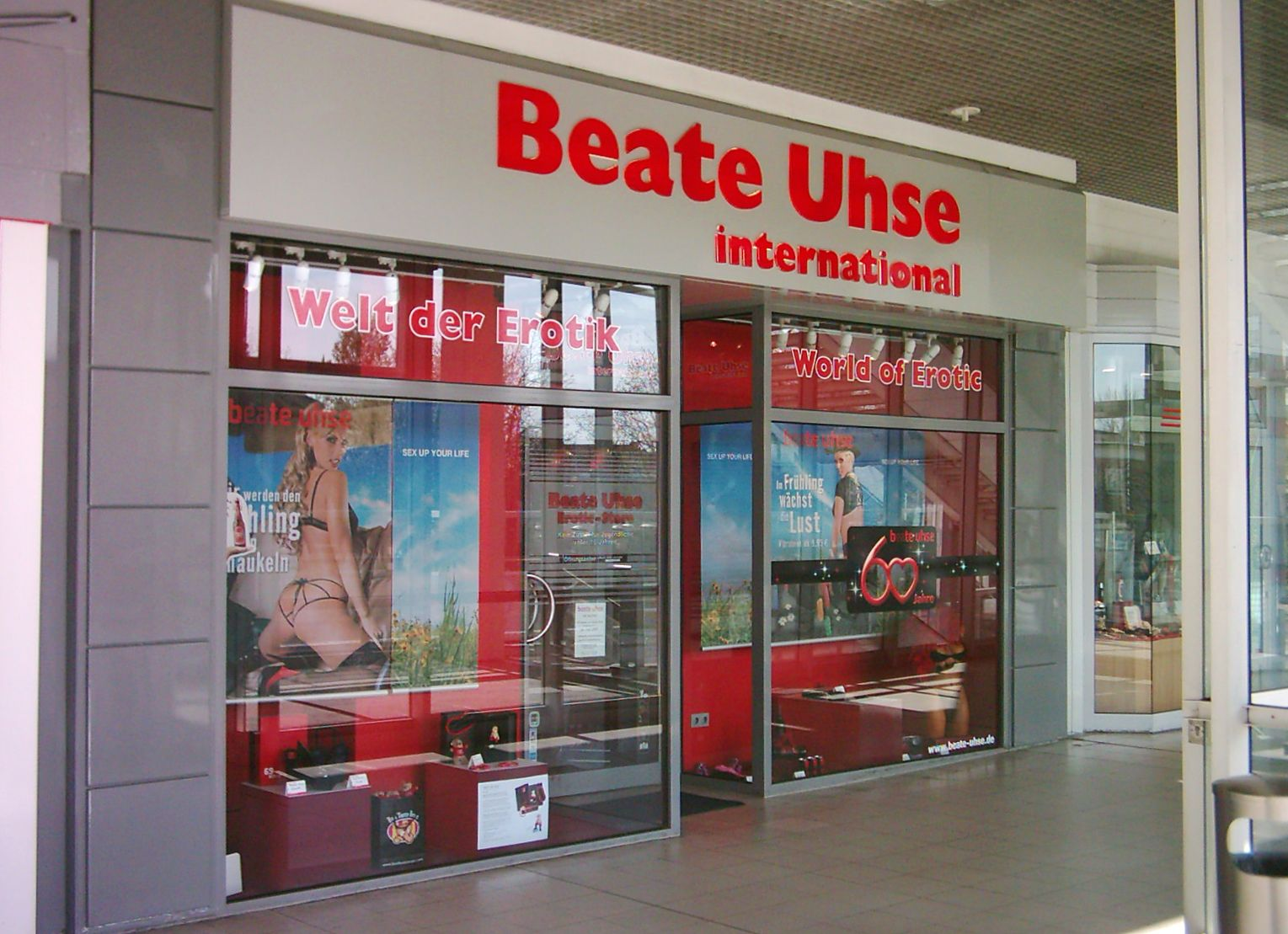
A Beate Uhse shop in Hamburg, Germany

In the early postwar period, former members of the Luftwaffe were not permitted to fly, ending Uhse's aviation career. Initially, she made a living on the black market. She sold products door-to-door and met many housewives and learned of their problems: former soldiers returning from the war were making their wives pregnant, not caring that there was "no apartment, no income and no future" for any children. Many of the women resorted to visiting untrained abortionists to deal with unwanted pregnancies. Uhse remembered lectures her doctor mother had given her on sexuality, sexual hygiene and contraception. She searched for information on the Knaus-Ogino rhythm method of contraception, and put together a brochure which explained to the women how to identify their fertile and infertile days.

By 1947, she had sold 32,000 copies of "Schrift X" (Pamphlet X) via her "Betu" mail order company, and began to expand to larger cities such as Hamburg and Bremen. Many people wrote her letters asking for advice on sexuality and eroticism. "These people were unaware of the facts of life," she wrote in her autobiography. Soon she was also selling condoms and "marriage guides".

In 1951, with four employees, she started the Beate Uhse Mail Order Co., offering condoms and books on "marital hygiene". Two years later, the company had 14 employees. Uhse married retailer Ernst-Walter Rotermund and had a second child, Ulrich, and gained two stepchildren, Dirk and Bärbel. The three sons later worked in the business.

In 1962, in Flensburg, she opened her "speciality store for marital hygiene" largely focused on sexuality, thus considered as the first sex shop. Her lawyers had advised opening around Christmas to reduce to likliehood of attacks from outraged members of the public during the festive season. She offered, both in her store and her catalogue, more "articles for marital hygiene". Soon the police began acting against the items in her store which supposedly served to "inflame and satisfy lustful desires in a manner contrary to decency and morality". By 1992, her store had been indicted more than 2,000 times. She was also discriminated against by other organisations, including the "Börsenverein des Deutschen Buchhandels" (a financial organisation of the German book industry), which refused to admit her publishing house due to "moral concerns". The Flensburger tennis club refused to admit her due to "general concerns".

In 1979, she divorced her second husband. In 1983, she was diagnosed with stomach cancer, but survived. At age 75 she earned a diving licence. In 1996, she fulfilled a long-held dream, and opened the Beate Uhse Erotic Museum in Berlin. Three years later, in 1999, her company, Beate Uhse AG, was listed on the German stock exchange and was met with great interest in the financial community. The stock was oversubscribed 64 times in its IPO. The original stock certificates are sought after because of the depiction of scantily dressed women.

The Beate Uhse business continues to trade throughout Europe under the names Beate Uhse, Pabo and et Eve. Beate-Uhse.TV, a private television station in Germany launched in March 2001.

In 2001, Uhse died of pneumonia in a clinic in St. Gallen, Switzerland.

Uhse was one of the most important people for sexual liberation in the German-speaking world. In 1989 she received the Federal Cross of Merit (German: Bundesverdienstkreuz).

Despite the fact that she contributed to bettering female sex lives, Beate Uhse remains a controversial figure for radical feminists, for her refusal to hire female collaborators an "objectification of the female" body to sell her products.

== Bibliography ==
- Uhse, Beate; Pramann, Ulrich (2001). Ich will Freiheit für die Liebe – Beate Uhse: Die Autobiographie [I Want Freedom For Love – Beate Uhse: The Autobiography]. Rebellische Frauen (in German). München: Ullstein Taschenbuch. ISBN 3-548-60049-2. OCLC 174695716.
- Uhse, Beate (1989). Mit Lust und Liebe: Mein Leben [With Pleasure and Love: My Life] (in German). Frankfurt am Main: Ullstein. ISBN 3-550-06429-2. OCLC 473012200.
- Heineman, Elizabeth (2011). Before Porn Was Legal: The Erotica Empire of Beate Uhse. Chicago: University of Chicago Press. ISBN 978-0-226-32521-7. OCLC 650505732.
