= Spirited Bodies =

British activist organisation

Spirited Bodies is an activist organisation that champions body positivity, feminism and personal empowerment through the practices of life modelling and life drawing. It was founded in by female professional life models based in London, UK, to create a safe environment in which groups of women could try nude modelling for artists. Subsequently it has staged both mixed-gender and women-only events.

Since 2018, Spirited Bodies has been active in campaigning for the use of life drawing as a means to help teenagers overcome social media body confidence issues by challenging the conceptions of conventional beauty.

== Origins ==
The concept of making a safe space to help women liberate themselves through life modelling originally emerged from a conversation between professional life models Morimda Tassembedo, Esther Bunting and Lucy Saunders.

== Philosophy ==
Spirited Bodies creates a space for people to discover the therapeutic value of shedding their inhibitions and seeing themselves in others' art. Their philosophy is that by shedding their clothes, amateur models will also shed their inhibitions and experience physical self-acceptance; baring all as a means of facing their own body issues through posing naked for artists.

== Life modelling ==
Spirited Bodies multi-model life drawing events have been held in diverse venues across London, including the Royal Festival Hall, Mall Galleries, Battersea Arts Centre, The Feminist Library, St John's Church and Sh! Women's Erotic Emporium. Further events have been held around the UK, from Totnes in Devon to Edinburgh in Scotland.

People who would like to try life modelling at Spirited Bodies events have been asked to fill-out an initial questionnaire to assess suitability. Workshops are held in which novices have the opportunity to model and also draw. Spirited Bodies life drawing can take place with up to 20 models in the room; up to 60 models featured at the Battersea Arts Centre in October 2012.

Participants have reported wanting to mark a milestone of body confidence – for example, weight lost or gained, age, physical or mental scarring, chronic illness – and have found life modelling a good way to reconnect with their physical self.

Spirited Bodies works with its models to come up with ideas for poses. They may be separate or together, connected with or without physical contact, in evolving tableaux rather than static scenes. Esther Bunting, as Artistic Director of Spirited Bodies, assists new models during events whilst sometimes modelling within the group herself.

By 2014, it was reported that demand for model places was outstripping availability.

== Activism ==
In August 2018, Spirited Bodies began campaigning to get life drawing in colleges and youth centres as a means of helping young people overcome body image anxiety and tackling the negative effects of social media on their mental health by showing what real people with real bodies look like.

The campaign attracted broad media interest across the UK, with interviews and articles in national newspapers, radio and television news. Global coverage included Mexican television news.

The way social media has affected life drawing was debated publicly when Esther Bunting was invited to speak at a panel event hosted by Mall Galleries, London in August 2018. From a premise that art is "often judged on the conventional attractiveness of the sitter rather than the quality of the painting", discussion covered how life modelling can be empowering and liberating, but that the male gaze continues to hinder body equality in the art room.

Esther Bunting is also a physical artist, writer and feminist who has been evolving performance art since 2009.
