= Orixa =

Orixa may refer to:

- Orixa (plant), a genus of plants in the family Rutaceae
- Orixa (moth), the synonym of a genus of moths in the family Erebidae
- Orixa (band), an alternative rock band
- Orixa or orisha, family of spirits
