= Sh! =

Sh! may refer to:

- Sh! is an abbreviation of Sh! Women's Erotic Emporium
- SH! is an abbreviation of Sledge Hammer!
