= Xylotype capax =

Scientific classification
- Kingdom: Animalia
- Phylum: Arthropoda
- Class: Insecta
- Order: Lepidoptera
- Superfamily: Noctuoidea
- Family: Noctuidae
- Genus: Xylotype
- Species: X. capax

Binomial name
- Xylotype capax (Grote, 1868)

Species of moth

Xylotype capax, known generally as the broad sallow moth or barrens xylotype, is a species of cutworm or dart moth in the family Noctuidae. It is found in North America.

The MONA or Hodges number for Xylotype capax is 9979.
