= Xanthodesma rectangulata =

Scientific classification
- Kingdom: Animalia
- Phylum: Arthropoda
- Clade: Pancrustacea
- Class: Insecta
- Order: Lepidoptera
- Superfamily: Noctuoidea
- Family: Erebidae
- Genus: Xanthodesma
- Species: X. rectangulata

Binomial name
- Xanthodesma rectangulata Kenrick, 1917

Species of moth

Xanthodesma rectangulata is a moth in the family Noctuidae. It was first described by George Hamilton Kenrick in 1917 and is known from Madagascar.

The head, antennae, palpi, legs and thorax of this species are ochreous orange, the abdomen dull yellowish. The forewings are dull orange, the veins all dark brown; a short dark basal line, a straight antemedian line, and a postmedian line strongly angulated on vein 6. The subterminal line is curved and followed by a distinct terminal line. The hindwings are uniformly dull orange. The wingspan of this moth is 44 mm.
