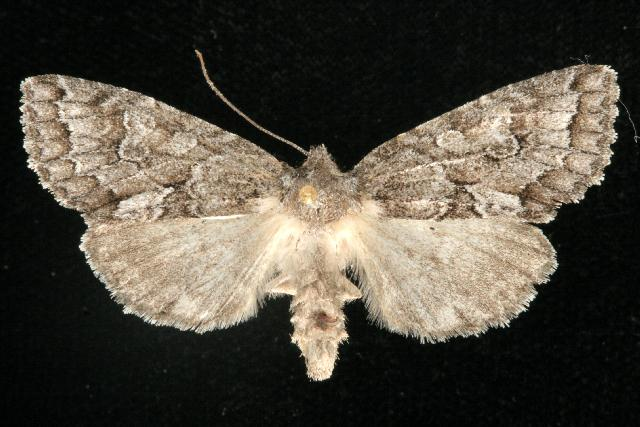

Scientific classification
- Kingdom: Animalia
- Phylum: Arthropoda
- Class: Insecta
- Order: Lepidoptera
- Superfamily: Noctuoidea
- Family: Noctuidae
- Genus: Xylotype
- Species: X. arcadia

Binomial name
- Xylotype arcadia Barnes & Benjamin, 1922

= Xylotype arcadia =

Species of moth

Xylotype arcadia, the acadian sallow, is a species of cutworm or dart moth in the family Noctuidae. It was first described by William Barnes and Foster Hendrickson Benjamin in 1922 and it is found in North America.

The MONA or Hodges number for Xylotype arcadia is 9980.
