= El Asira =

- Company type: Private
- Website type: e-commerce
- Available in: English, Dutch
- Founded: 2010
- Dissolved: 2016 (by 3 news reports)
- Headquarters: {{{location_country}}}
- Founder: Abdelaziz Aouragh
- Industry: Sex shop
- Launched: 2010
- Current status: discontinued

El Asira is the first Muslim sex shop, where marketing, language, and products are Shariah compliant. It was founded by Abdelaziz Aouragh in 2010. The company ships products to over 30 countries. The company hopes to expand public opinion of Islam and sexuality.
