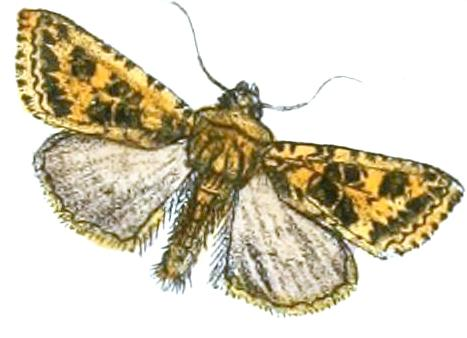

Scientific classification
- Kingdom: Animalia
- Phylum: Arthropoda
- Class: Insecta
- Order: Lepidoptera
- Superfamily: Noctuoidea
- Family: Noctuidae
- Genus: Xenotrachea
- Species: X. auroviridis

Binomial name
- Xenotrachea auroviridis (Moore, 1867)

Synonyms
- Hadena auroviridis Moore, 1867

= Xenotrachea auroviridis =

Species of moth

Xenotrachea auroviridis is a species of moth of the family Noctuidae. It is found in India (including Bengal).
