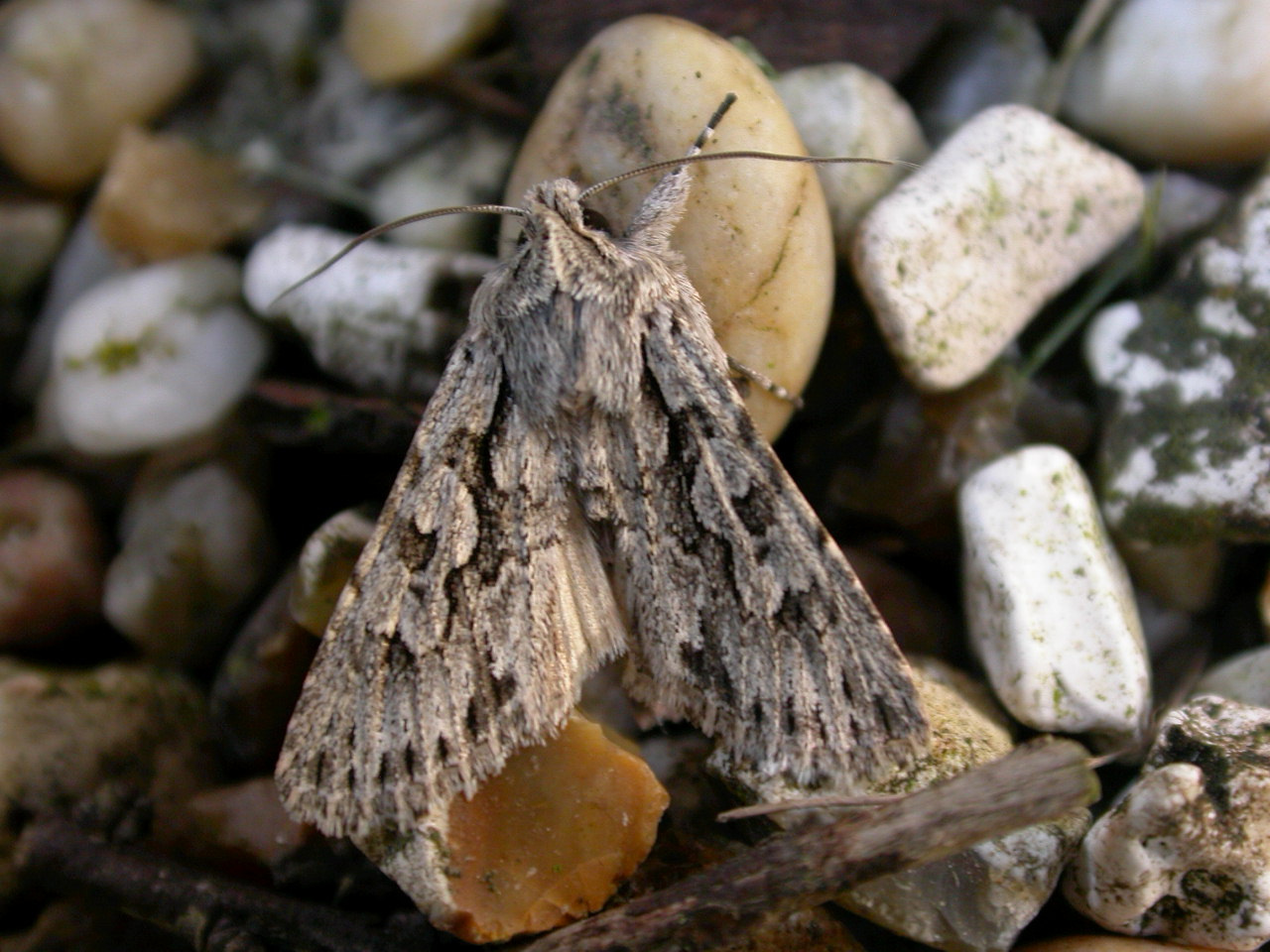

Scientific classification
- Kingdom: Animalia
- Phylum: Arthropoda
- Class: Insecta
- Order: Lepidoptera
- Superfamily: Noctuoidea
- Family: Noctuidae
- Genus: Xylocampa
- Species: X. areola

Binomial name
- Xylocampa areola (Esper, 1789)

= Xylocampa areola =

Species of moth

The Early Grey (Xylocampa areola) is a species of moth of the family Noctuidae. It is found in Europe and Morocco.

The wingspan is 32–40 mm. Seitz describes it - Forewing pale grey varied with darker, darkest in median and marginal areas; veins black-speckled; a black streak from base on submedian fold, with a whitish patch above it; the two lines black, approximating below median, conversely edged with white; orbicular and reniform stigmata large, 8-shaped, pale grey, with darker centres, the orbicular projecting obliquely below median and connected there with reniform; submarginal line white, serrate, followed by a row of black marginal lunules; fringe deep, grey mottled with paler; hindwing pale grey, the cell spot, veins, and outer line darker: in the form suffusa Tutt the dark median area below the stigmata becomes blackish and forms with the black streak from base a curved black marking. The larva is dull pinkish ochreous, with a paler dorsal line and dark brown blotches on dorsum on segments 7 and 8; the 11th segment is slightly humped.

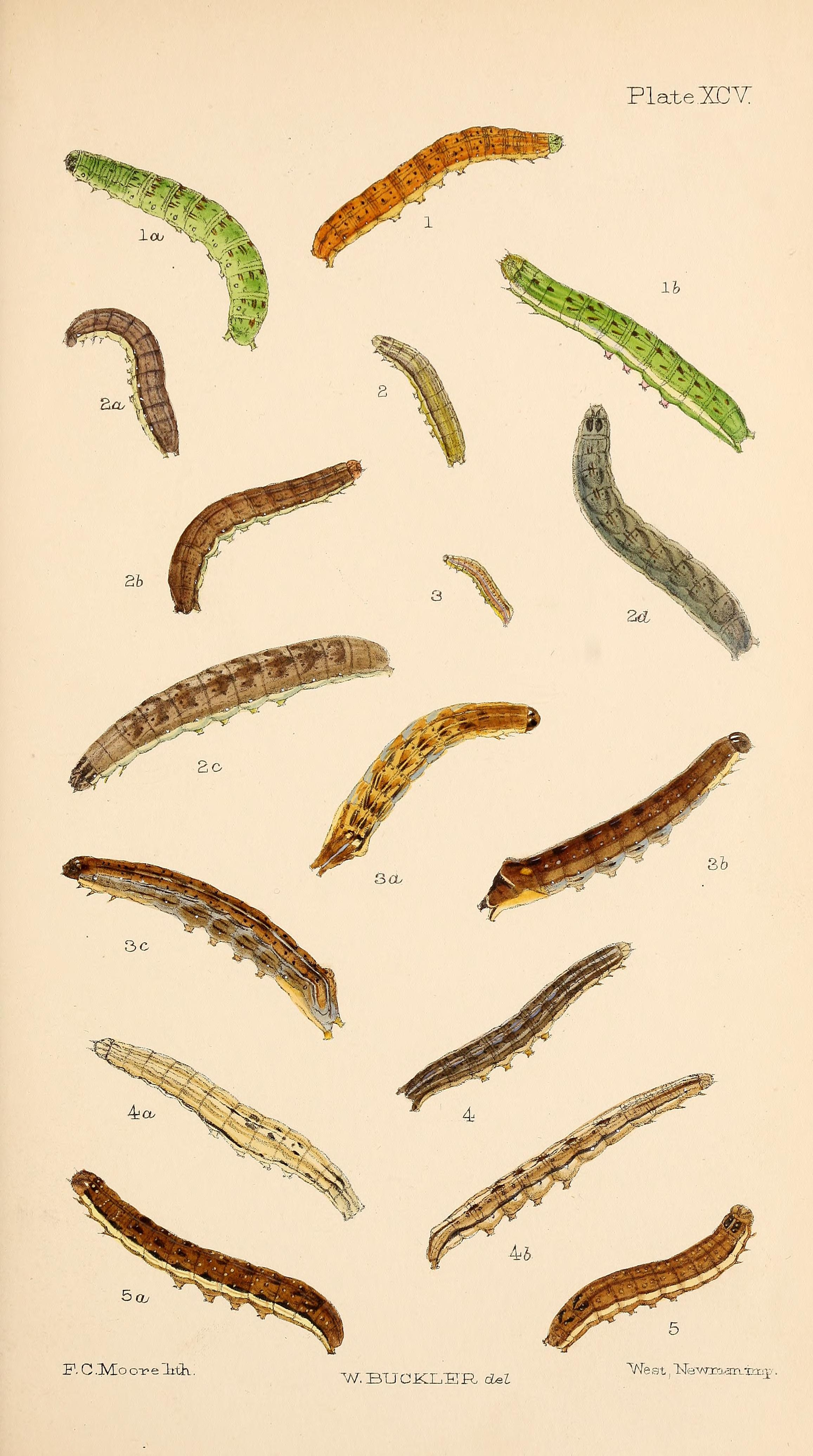
Figs.4, 4a, 4b larva after last moult

The moth flies from February to May depending on the location.

The larvae feed on honeysuckle (Lonicera species).
