= Beate-Uhse.TV =

German television channel dedicated to softcore pornography

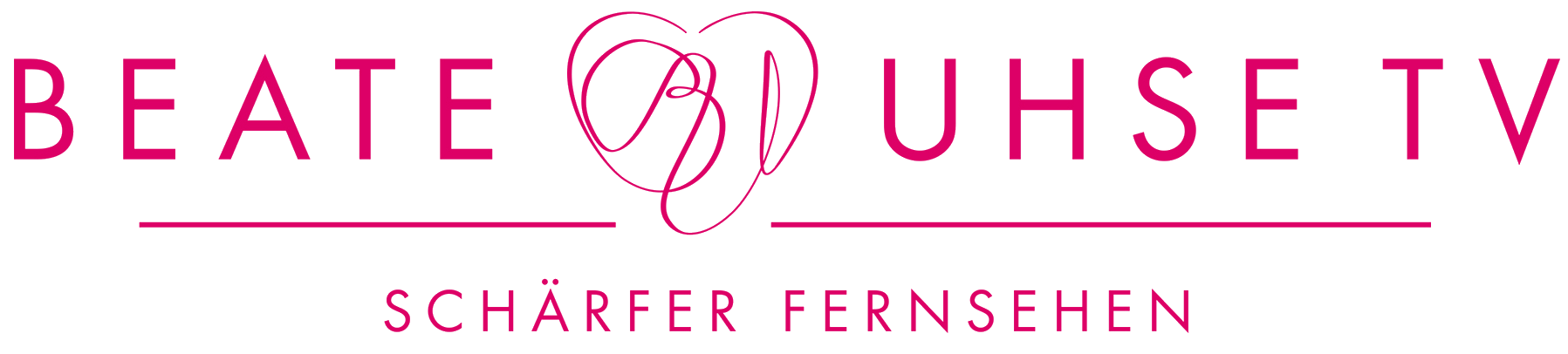
- Country: Germany
- Broadcast area: Germany; Austria
- Headquarters: Berlin, Germany

Programming
- Language: German
- Picture format: 576i (16:9 SDTV)

Ownership
- Owner: tmc Content Group GmbH

History
- Launched: 1 March 2001; 25 years ago

Beate-Uhse.TV is a private television station in Germany belonging to the Beate Uhse sex shop franchise, dedicated to softcore pornography. It is operated by tmc Content Group GmbH based in Berlin. Beate-Uhse.TV broadcasts daily from 20:15 to 5:45.

== History ==
The Media Council of the Medienanstalt Berlin-Brandenburg (mabb) granted the broadcasting license in 2000. The erotic programme consists of a licensed program (feature films and series) and in-house productions (magazines, reports and documentaries). Target group are adults between 25 and 55 years. Although originally conceived for predominantly male viewers, the station has long been increasingly attracting couples and women.

All content is audited by Freiwillige Selbstkontrolle Fernsehen (FSF) and / or Freiwillige Selbstkontrolle der Filmwirtschaft (FSK) and released by the youth protection officer (German: Jugendschutzbeauftragter) of the broadcaster.

On 23 October 2014, the operator of Beate Uhse TV, tmc Content Group GmbH, announced that it had carried out a relaunch of Beate-Uhse.TV and, in this context, is now also broadcasting under a new logo.

== Distribution ==
Beate-Uhse.TV is available in SD quality in the pay-tv offer of Sky Deutschland in Germany and Austria.

== Logos ==
1 March 2001 – 22 October 2014

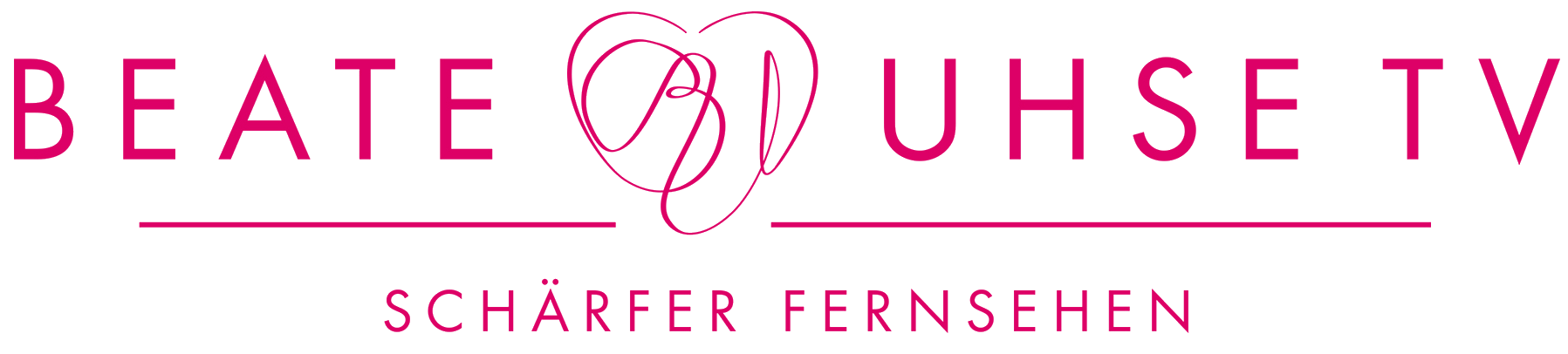
23 October 2014 – present
