= Margarete Köstlin-Räntsch =

German doctor (1880–1945)

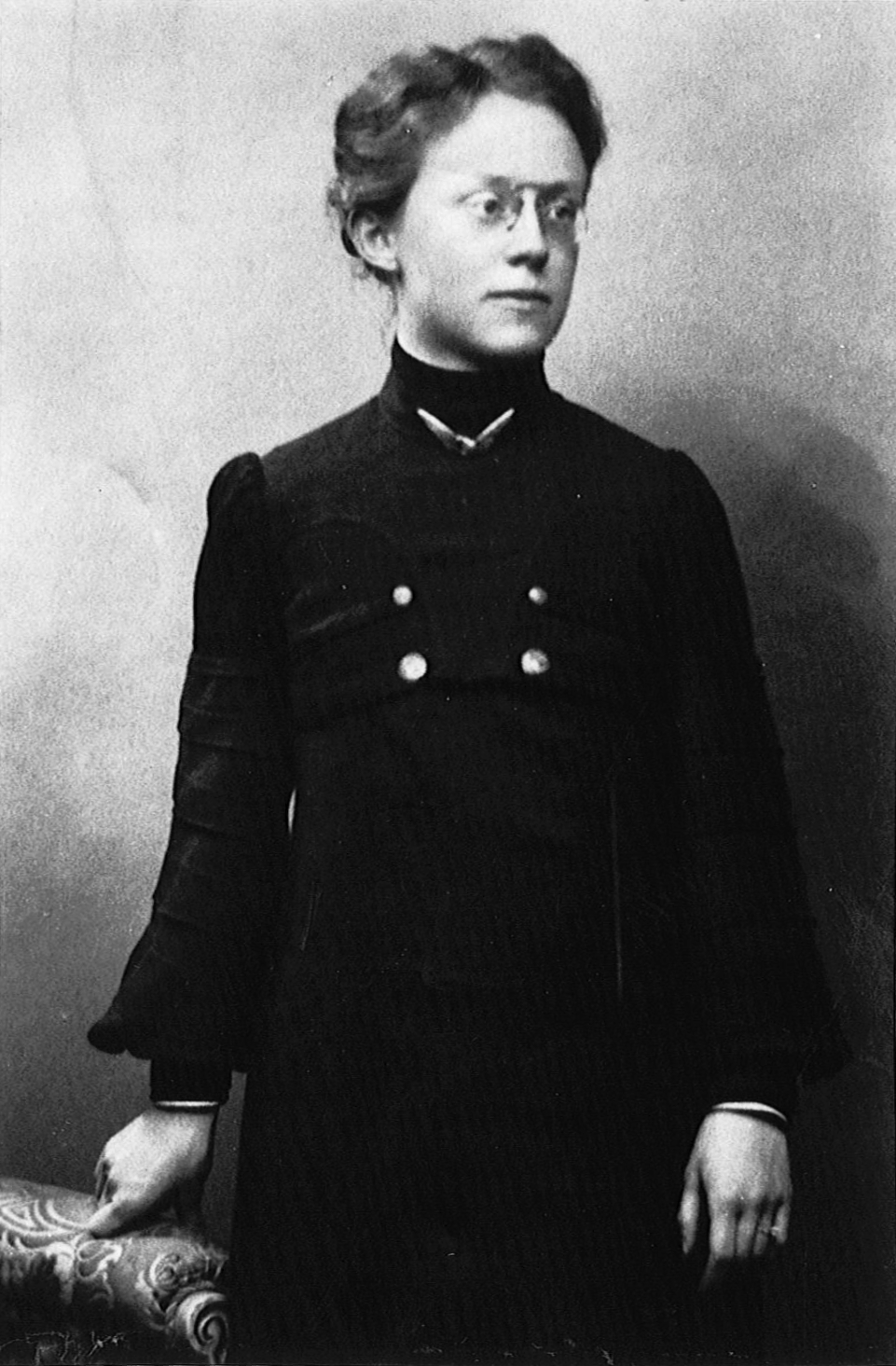
Margarete Köstlin-Räntsch

Margarete Köstlin-Räntsch (born Agnes Elise Margarethe Donner) (18 November 1880 - summer of 1945) was one of Germany's first female doctors. Her third child was the pilot and sex shop entrepreneur Beate Uhse.

== Early life ==
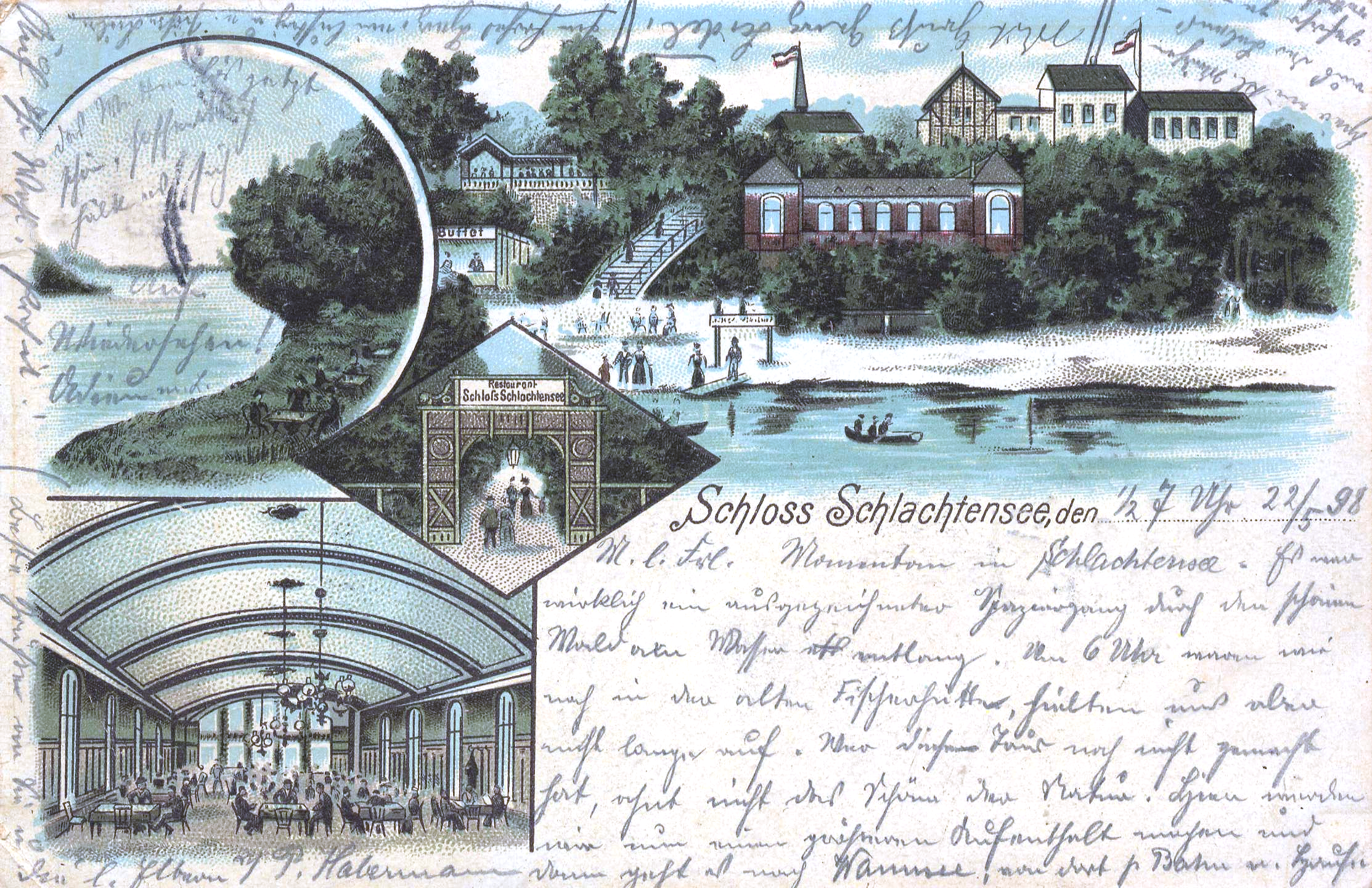
The ‘Schloss Schlachtensee’ restaurant on a contemporary postcard from 1898, owned by the Fritz Räntsch Heirs

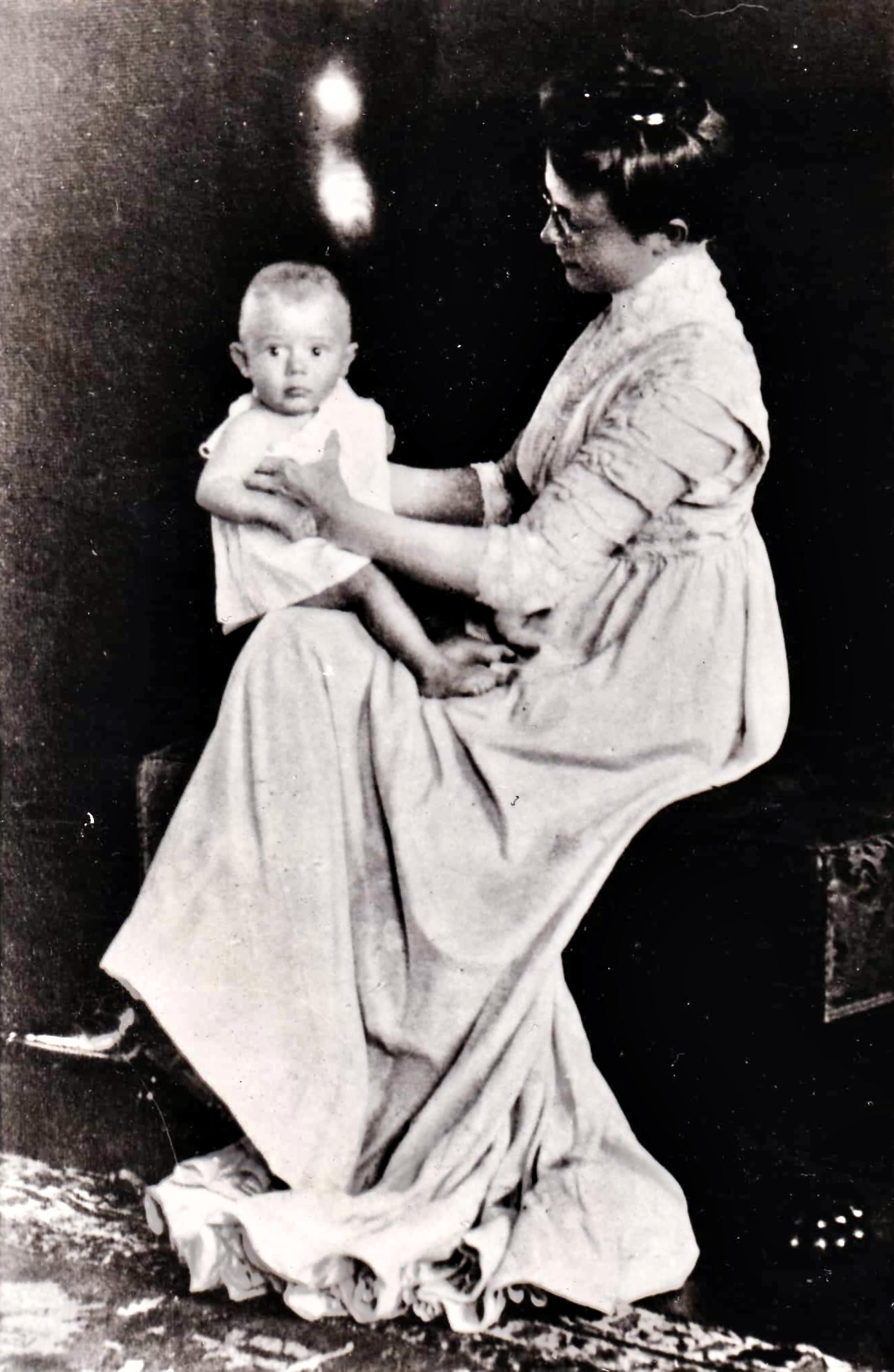
Margarete Köstlin with her third child Beate, c. 1920

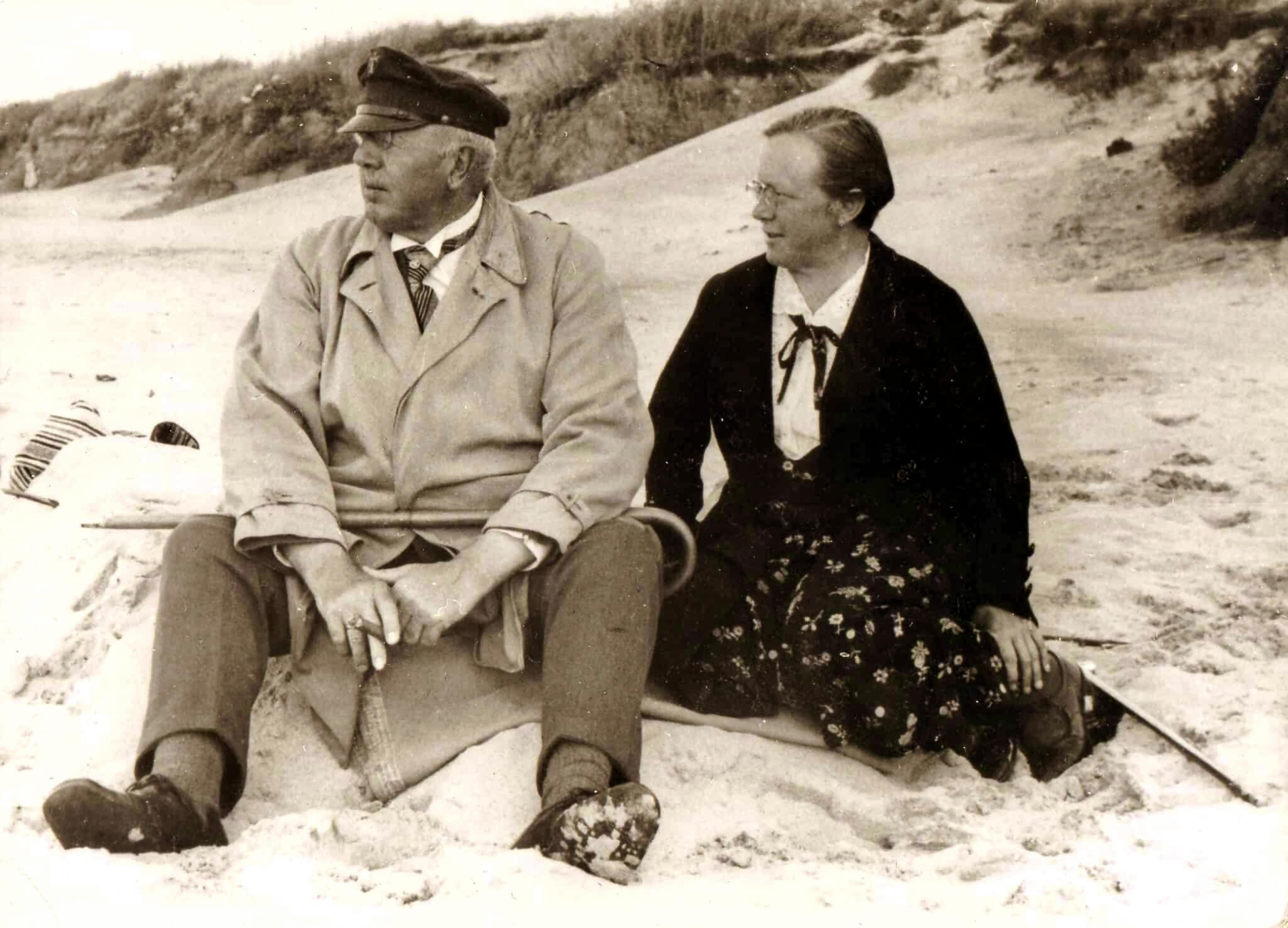
Otto and Margarete Köstlin on the Baltic Sea beach in East Prussia, 1930s

Margarete Räntsch was the daughter of brewery director Friedrich ‘Fritz’ Carl Leopold Räntsch (7 October 1844 – 26 October 1891) and his future wife Agnes, née Donner (born 26 December 1855) who married on 6 February 1886. Her father separated from his first wife Caroline Wilke c. 1882 and divorced in 1885. The Räntschs were an upper-middle-class family and young Margarete was brought up strictly but liberally. She learnt to play the piano well at an early age. She had four younger siblings: Fritz Gustav Paul, (b. 1883); Carl Louis Adolf (b. 1887); Elisabeth Maria Johanna (b. 1890) and Waldemar (b.& d. 1892). Her father died young at the age of 47, when Margarete was only ten years old, a traumatic experience in her childhood. Waldemar was a posthumus baby, born three months after her father's death, but died at the age of five and a half months.

Shortly before his death, her father had purchased the restaurant ‘Auf dem Kynast’ for 200,000 marks. It was a popular dining spot situated on the shores of Schlachtensee. Following extensive expansion to accommodate 1,000 guests, he reopened it as ‘Schloss Schlachtensee’ and further expanded it with annexes and terraces to accommodate 2,000 guests. After her father's death, the restaurant remained in the possession of her stepmother, who then gradually leased it out to third parties, including her brother-in-law.

== Education ==
Margarete Räntsch initially attended a Höhere Mädchenschule (secondary school for girls), where she studied Latin and Ancient Greek. As there were no state-run programmes at the time enabling girls to continue their schooling up to the Abitur (school-leaving certificate), she enrolled in one of the privately funded grammar school courses run by educational pioneer Helene Lange to enable her to complete her schooling. This enabled her to sit the school-leaving examination at the Königlichen Luisengymnasium in Berlin in the summer of 1901.

Räntsch decided to study medicine and enrolled at the University of Freiburg. After her second semester, she transferred to the Ludwig-Maximilians-Universität München for two further semesters. She then transferred to the Friedrich Wilhelm University of Berlin, where she passed her preliminary medical examination at the end of the 1903/04 winter semester. However, in order to be allowed to enrol at the University of Würzburg, Räntsch first had to register there as an auditor for two semesters. She eventually studied for four semesters at the Julius Maximilian University of Würzburg. In 1903, alongside Grete Ehrenberg and Barbara Heffner, she was one of the first three female students at the university. In the winter of 1906, Räntsch passed her medical examination and received her licence to practise medicine on 21 December 1906.

In early January 1907, Räntsch was admitted to the final clinical year of study. Räntsch was the first woman whose thesis was accepted by the Faculty of Medicine at the University of Würzburg (in November/December 1907). In 1908, she completed her studies with a doctorate under Karl Bernhard Lehmann. Her dissertation is entitled Untersuchungen über die Glätte von Kleiderstoffen (Investigations into the Smoothness of Clothing Fabrics).

== Medical career ==
Margarete Räntsch set up practice as a doctor in Quarnbek, near Kiel, in 1908. Later, until around 1917, she worked at the Heinrich Children's Hospital (Hei-Ki-Ho) in Kiel, founded in 1906, at Lorentzendamm 8/10 (today known as Kiel University Children's Hospital). Räntsch travelled around 25 kilometres by horse and cart every morning and evening to work there.

== Family life ==
In 1908, Margarete Räntsch married Otto Köstlin (1871–1945), a farmer from Treherz in Württemberg and settled with him in Quarnbek near Kiel. The marriage produced three children: Ulrich (b. 1907), Elisabeth (b. 1909) and Beate (b. 1919), the latter born on the Wargenau estate in East Prussia. Margarete Köstlin-Räntsch was related to the President of the Reichsbank, Hjalmar Schacht, who stood as godparent with his wife Luise to the youngest daughter, Beate. Her children were brought up as equals and received sex education at an early age. The two daughters were allowed to do everything their brother was allowed to do. In their social circle, girls were subject to far more restrictions and rules of behaviour than boys. The parents spoke openly with their three children about sexuality. The children were sent to progressive boarding schools such as the Schule am Meer on the North Sea island of Juist, founded by Martin Luserke in 1925, and the Odenwald School, and on student exchange programmes abroad. Margarete Räntsch attached great importance to her daughters mastering the household management ‘inside out’, regardless of their future careers. She believed this was the only way they could be the ‘Seele vons Janze’ (Berlin dialect for: the soul of the whole) and able to organise everything perfectly.

In 1917, the Köstlin-Räntsch family purchased an estate of 1,800 Morgen (450 hectares) of land in Wargenau (now Malinowka) near Cranz (now Zelenogradsk) in what was then East Prussia. The manor house was set within extensive grounds, and with a large garden with apple trees behind the house. After the move to East Prussia, Köstlin-Räntsch did not hold paid employent but worked in both medicine and estate management. Contuniing to work in her chosen career had been her condition of marriage to her husband. She took on the entire commercial management of the estate and the medical care of her own family as well as the numerous estate employees and their 24 families.

The Köstlin-Räntschs modernised the manor house, fitting it with electricity, a telephone and flush toilets. When their son Ulrich was studying law in Königsberg, he was allowed to invite as many fellow students to the estate as it was possible to accommodate. Whenever the navy docked at Cranz, young naval officers would be invited to visit. Parties danced to shellac records played on the gramophone. In 1932, Margarete Köstlin-Räntsch and her husband allowed two young men to use a harvested field on the estate as their landing strip from which to conduct sightseeing airplane flights over East Prussia. During her school holidays, their youngest daughter, Beate, met the pilots and was allowed to fly along for free in a spare seat, which led to a fascination with flight and eventually a career as a pilot.

In the summer of 1945, the Köstlin-Räntsch couple were murdered in Wargenau by soldiers of the advancing Red Army. Their adult children only found out their parents' fate years later.

== Commemoration ==
Margarete Räntsch is honoured with a commemorative plaque in Würzburg.
