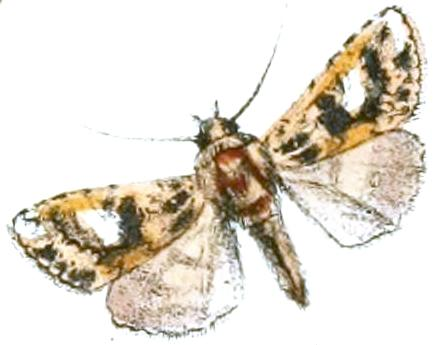

Scientific classification
- Kingdom: Animalia
- Phylum: Arthropoda
- Class: Insecta
- Order: Lepidoptera
- Superfamily: Noctuoidea
- Family: Noctuidae
- Genus: Xenotrachea
- Species: X. albidisca

Binomial name
- Xenotrachea albidisca (Moore, 1867)

Synonyms
- Hadena albidisca Moore, 1867; Dianthaecia nivescens Butler, 1889

= Xenotrachea albidisca =

Species of moth

Xenotrachea albidisca is a species of moth of the family Noctuidae. It is found in India, western China, Taiwan, Vietnam and Borneo.
