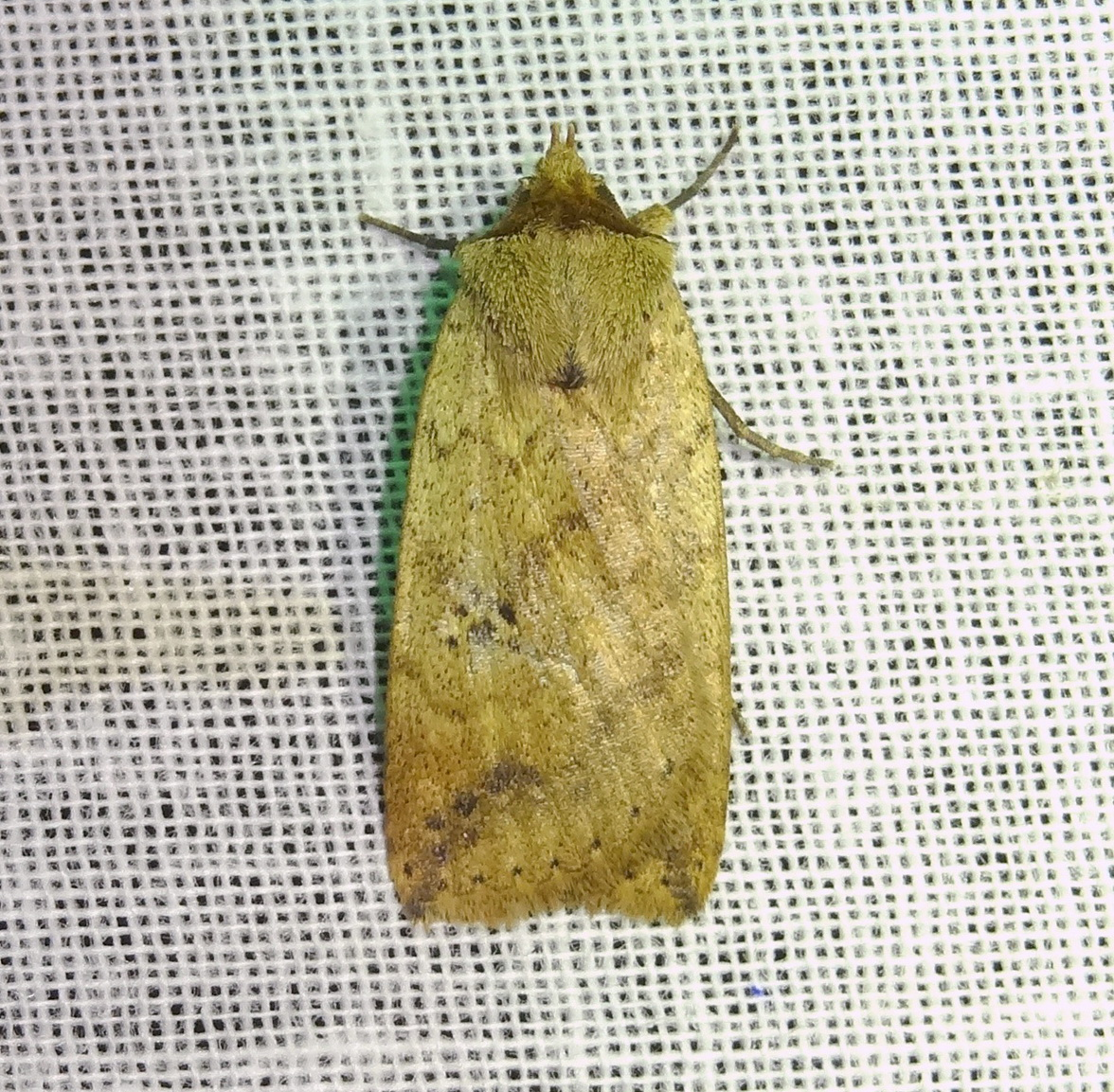

Scientific classification
- Kingdom: Animalia
- Phylum: Arthropoda
- Class: Insecta
- Order: Lepidoptera
- Superfamily: Noctuoidea
- Family: Noctuidae
- Genus: Xylostola
- Species: X. indistincta

Binomial name
- Xylostola indistincta (Moore, 1882)

Synonyms
- Vapara indistincta Moore, 1882

= Xylostola indistincta =

Species of moth

Xylostola indistincta is a moth of the family Noctuidae first described by Frederic Moore in 1882. It is found from the Indo-Australian tropics of India, Sri Lanka to New Guinea.

== Description ==
Its wingspan is 40–42 mm or, according to another source, 33–41 mm. Palpi with the long third joint. Antennae of male fasciculate. Head and collar chestnut colored. Thorax brownish ochreous. Abdomen fuscous. Forewing brownish ochreous, with traces of transverse lines. Orbicular sometimes represented by a dark speck. Reniform with some dark specks round it. There is an indistinct submarginal line, with some dark suffused marks on each side of it near apex. A marginal series of black specks present. Hindwings fuscous. Ventral side with cell-spot and postmedial line.
