= Sex shop =

Retailer of adult erotic entertainment products

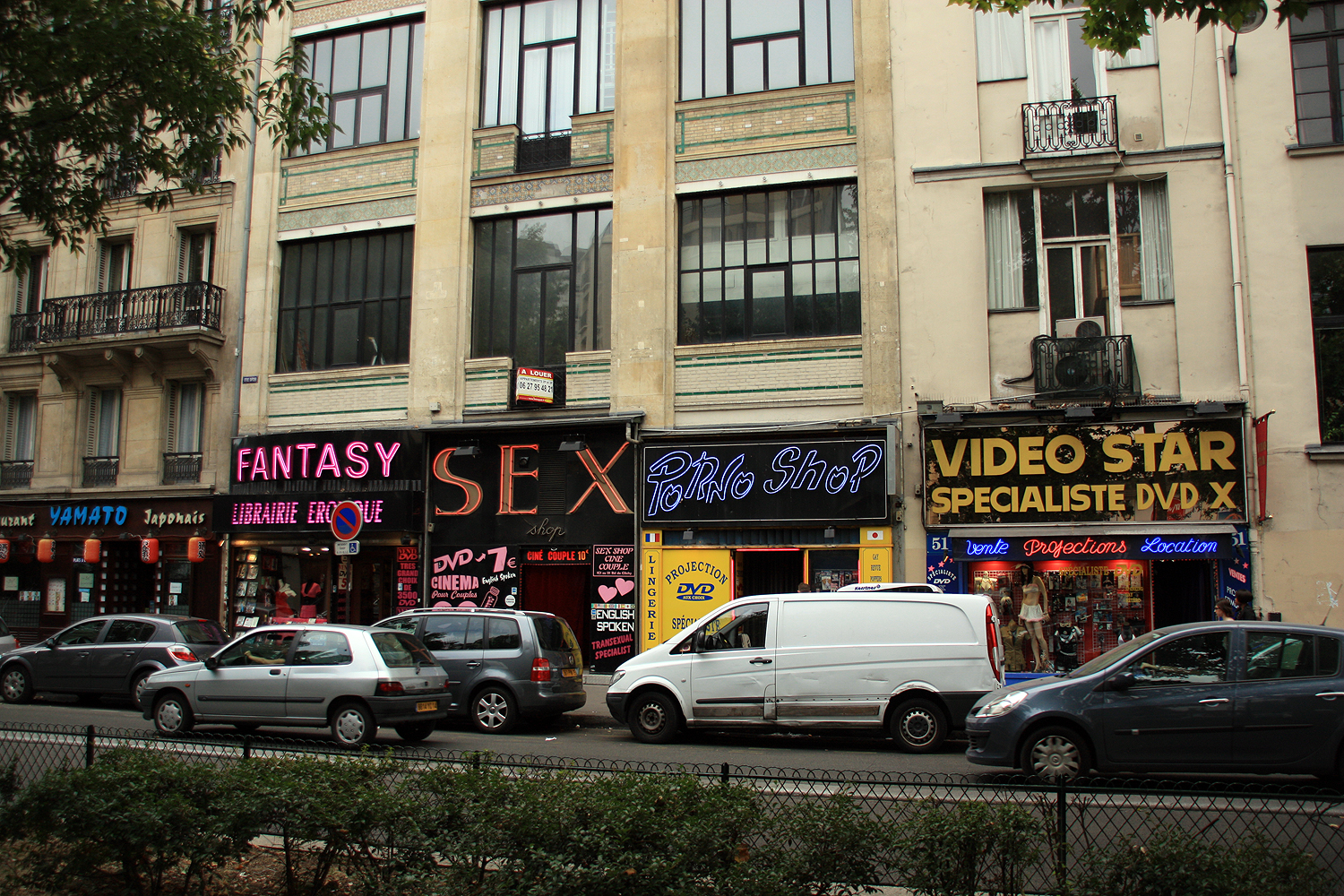
Sex shops on Boulevard de Clichy, Paris, France

A sex shop is a retailer that sells products related to sexual or erotic entertainment, such as sex toys, lingerie, pornography, and other related products. An early precursor of the modern sex shop was a chain of stores set up in Paris in the 1920s by Léon Vidal, the founder of the lingerie manufacturing company Diana Slip. His shops sold erotic books and photographs as well as lingerie.

Beate Uhse AG opened a sex shop in 1962 in Flensburg, West Germany, and it has been described as the world's first "official" sex shop. Sex shops can now be found in many countries and online. Sex shops are part of the sex industry. In most jurisdictions, sex shops are regulated by law, with access not legally permitted to minors, the age depending on local law. Some jurisdictions prohibit sex shops and the merchandise they sell. In other jurisdictions, sex shops are tolerated provided that they do not have window displays in view of the general public; the windows are usually blacked out or covered on the inside by venetian blinds. In some jurisdictions that permit it, they may also show pornographic movies in private video booths, or have private striptease or peep shows. An adult movie theater may be attached. There are also many online sex shops selling a variety of adult content such as sex toys, pornographic magazines, pornographic films and fetish wear etc.

== Terminology ==
A sex shop may also be called an adult shop, adult store, erotic shop, sexy shop, porn shop, adult entertainment store, or adult book store. In some jurisdictions, polite euphemisms are used such as "marital aid store" or "adult novelties store".

== History ==
=== Australia ===
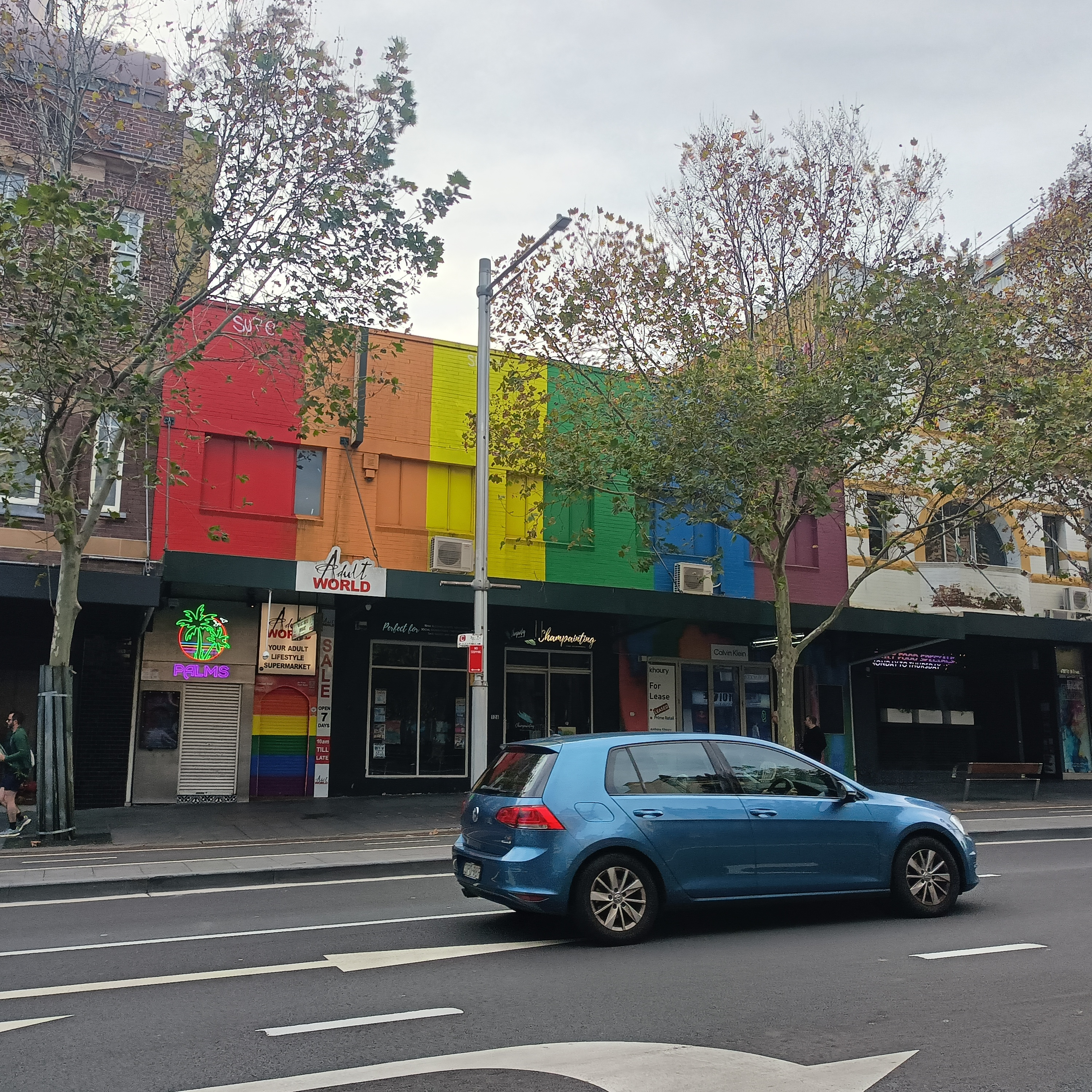
A rainbow flag on the exterior façade and doorway of a sex shop in Darlinghurst, Sydney, Australia (2026)

In the 1960s, American military personnel spending rest and recreation time in the Kings Cross area of Sydney led to a proliferation of sex shops in the area. The development of sex shops in the country was assisted by the legalisation of the import of pornographic magazines in 1971, the appearance of mass-produced battery-powered vibrators in the 1970s and the arrival of X-rated videos in the 1980s. The popularity of Internet pornography in the 2000s resulted in a drop in sex shop sales, some store closures and diversification into non-sex-related adult goods. Online sex-shops have also opened.

Sex shops in Australia are regulated by state laws and are subject to local planning controls. While laws differ between states, licensees must abide by strict conditions that commonly require premises to be at least 200 metres from schools and churches. Windows are often required to be blacked out and admission restricted to over 18s, with offences prosecuted by police under section 578E of the Crimes Act.

Under the laws of the state of New South Wales (NSW), non-contraceptive sex products can be sold only in shops that have been granted a restricted premise licence by local councils. Nevertheless, by 2013, a number of NSW lingerie stores had begun selling adult toys and books in shopping malls without being granted a licence.

=== China ===
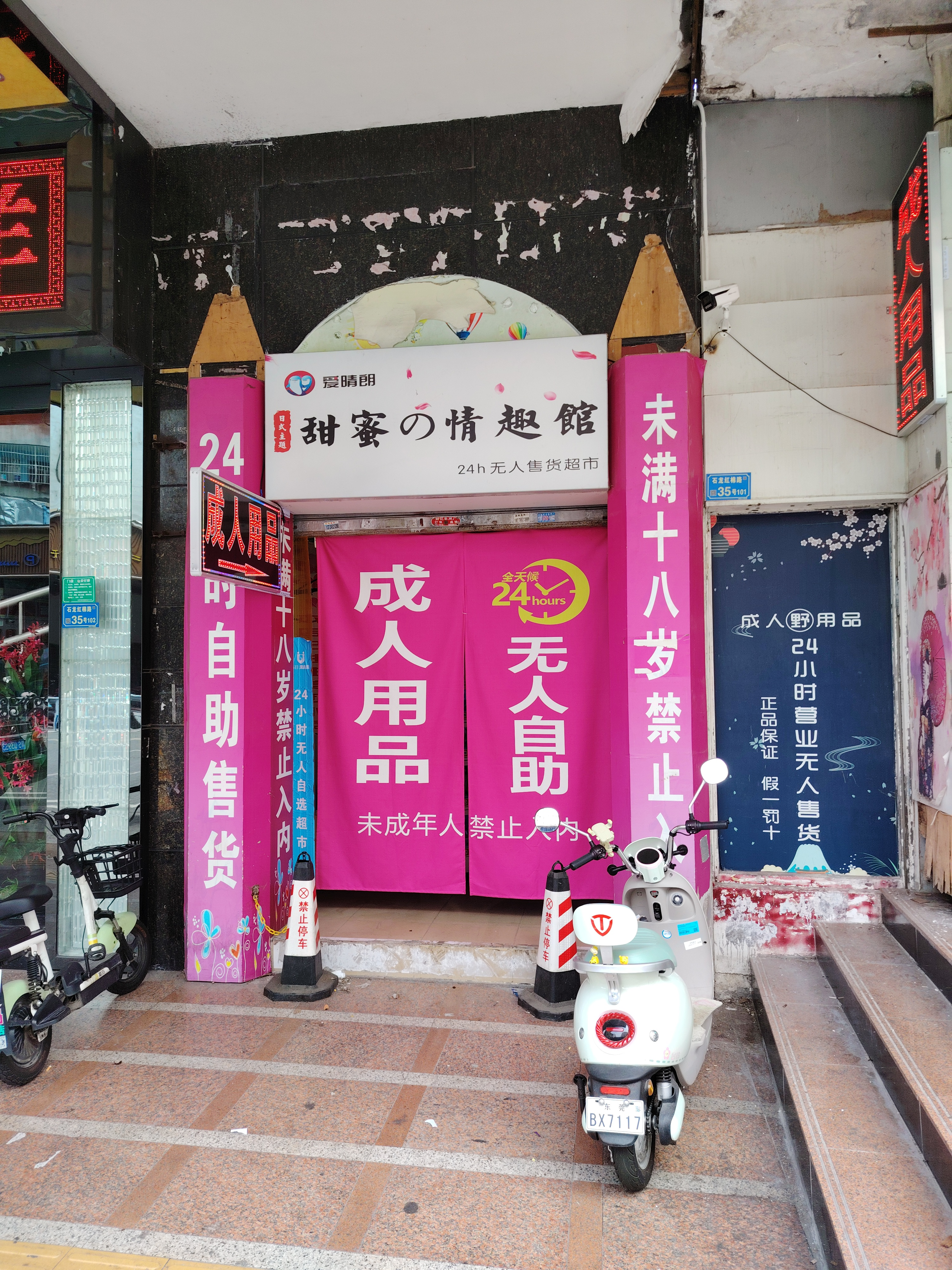
A sex shop in Dongguan, China

Mainland China's first sex shop opened in Beijing in 1993 and by 2013, there were over 2,000 sex shops in the city. Most of their products are made in China. Sex shops in China often present themselves as "healthcare centres" selling "medical aids" for sexual dysfunction.

=== Canada ===
The first sex shop in North America was called The Garden. It was opened in October 1971 by Ivor Sargent on Crescent Street in downtown Montreal, Quebec. The Garden combined the concepts used by Beate Uhse in Germany and Ann Summers in the UK. The store's opening attracted long lines of shoppers. The Palm Beach Post commented: "Like the chicken or the egg controversy, no one is really sure which came first-the sex boutique or the so-called sexual revolution".

Although the age of consent is 16 in Canada, an age of 18+ is required to view or purchase pornography. There are no specific laws against using or buying sex toys at any particular age. However, most sex shops sell adult videos, which means that most sex toys are on sale only to adults.

=== Germany ===
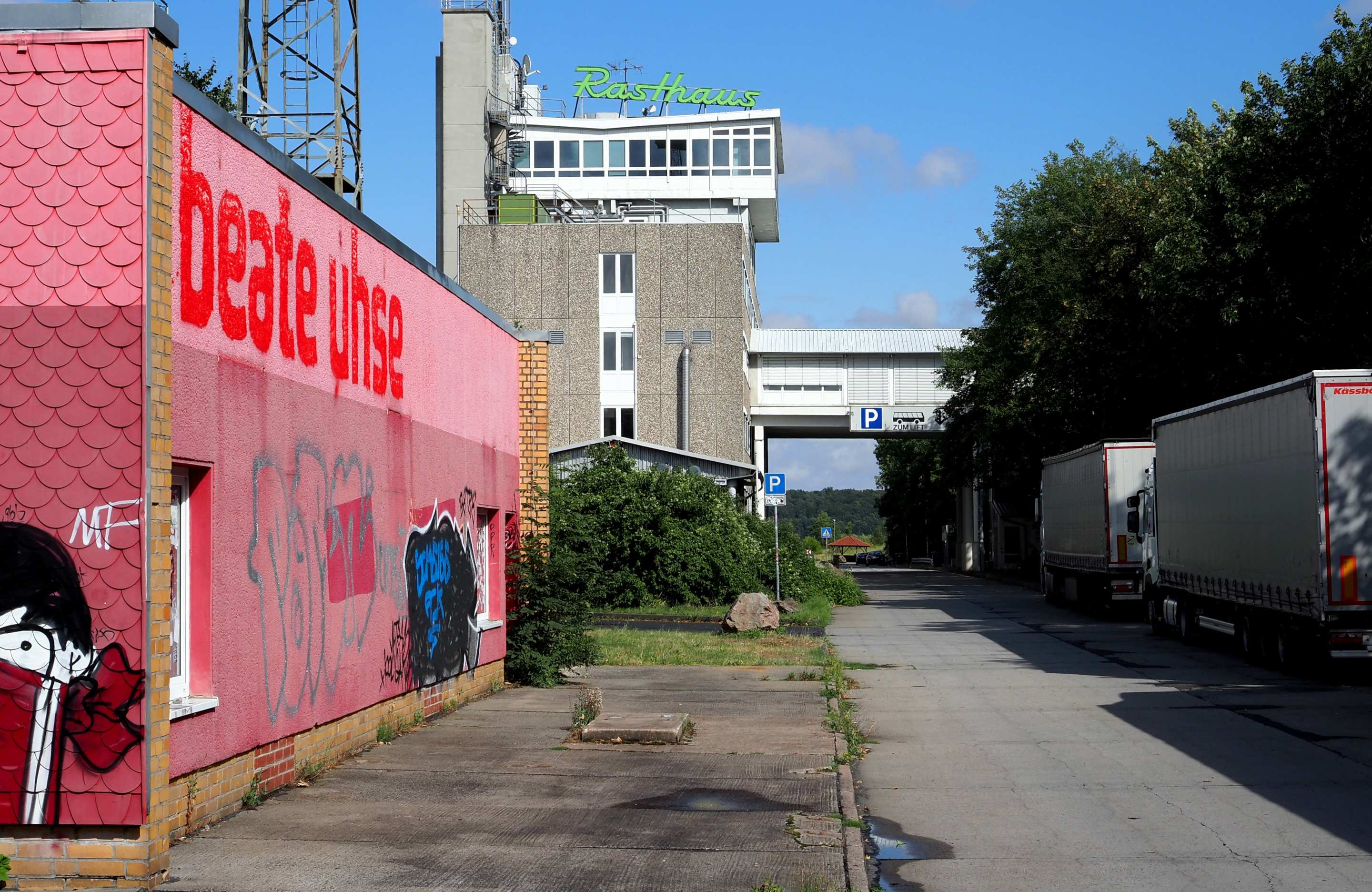
Sex shop at a former checkpoint on the Iron Curtain

Beate Uhse-Rotermund started selling contraception information by mail order in 1946, and she opened her first shop in 1962. Legal restrictions in West Germany dating back to 1872 were tightened in 1968. Pornography was legalized in West Germany in 1975, although this never happened in East Germany.

=== Hungary ===
The first Hungarian sex shop opened on 15 November 1989, before the end of communism in Hungary, at 14 Károly Boulevard in Budapest, under the name Intim Center, which still exists today. At that time, the three T-categories were so suddenly moved from the forbidden to the tolerated that even the press of the time reported the administrative uncertainties surrounding the sex shop in this way.

=== Ireland ===
Sex shops began to appear in Ireland in the 1990s, usually in low-key locations. The 1999 opening of the UK sex-shop chain Ann Summers' outlet in Dublin's central O'Connell Street provoked controversy.

Capel Street, in the Dublin 1 postal district just north of the River Liffey is a centre for sex shops.

=== Italy ===
The first sex shop in Italy was opened in 1975 in Milan. Since then more sex shops have opened, mostly in Rome. In 2018, the city of Pistoia in Tuscany banned the opening of new sex shops in the city's history centre.

=== Japan ===
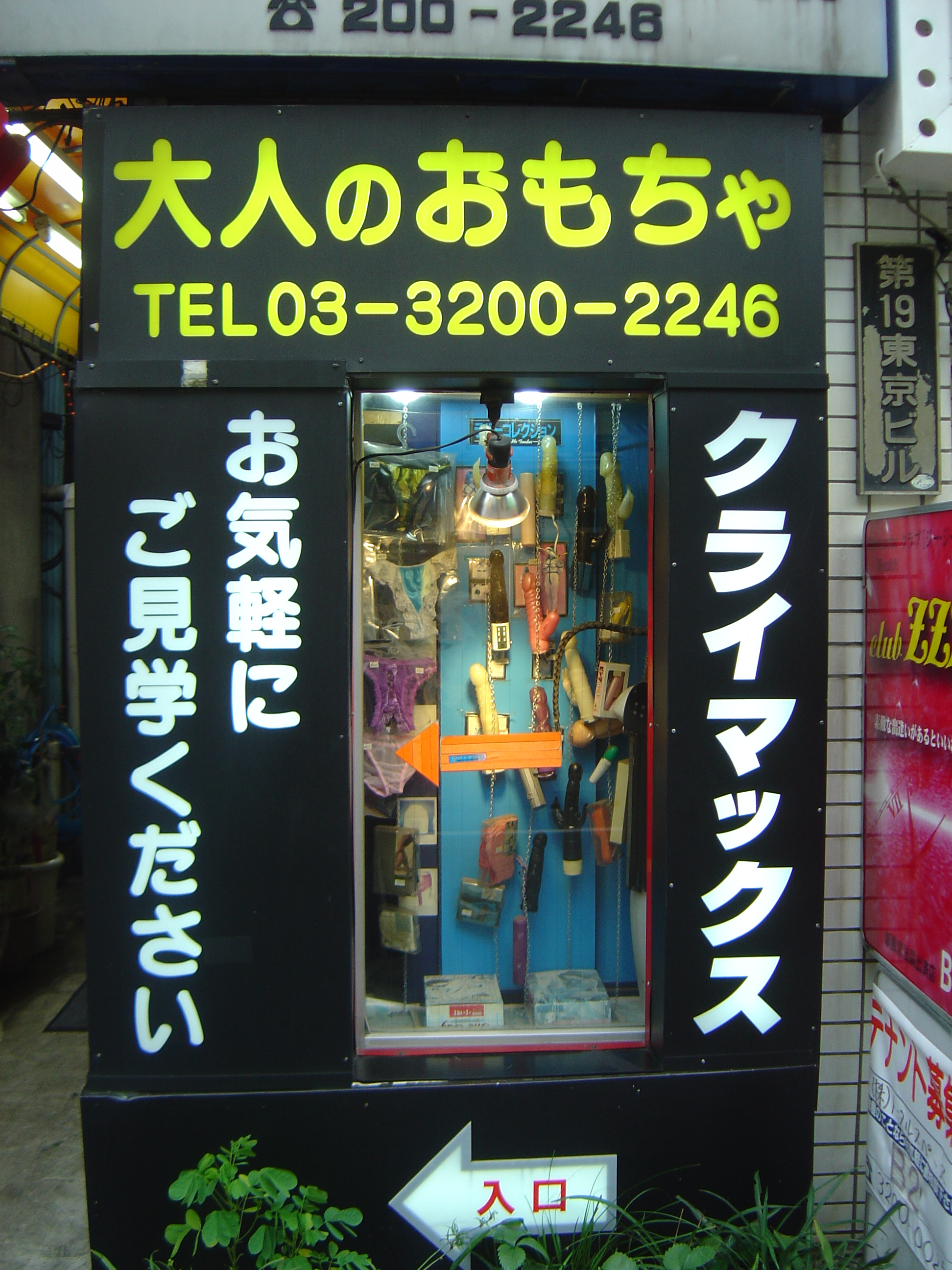
Front window of a Tokyo sex shop advertising adult toys

In Japan, sex shops are found in places such as the Kabukichō district of Tokyo as well as the mizu shōbai districts of suburban cities. The shops contain hentai magazines, adult videos and DVDs. In some Japanese sex shops, known as voyeur shops, customers can pay to take nude photographs of young women.

=== The Netherlands ===
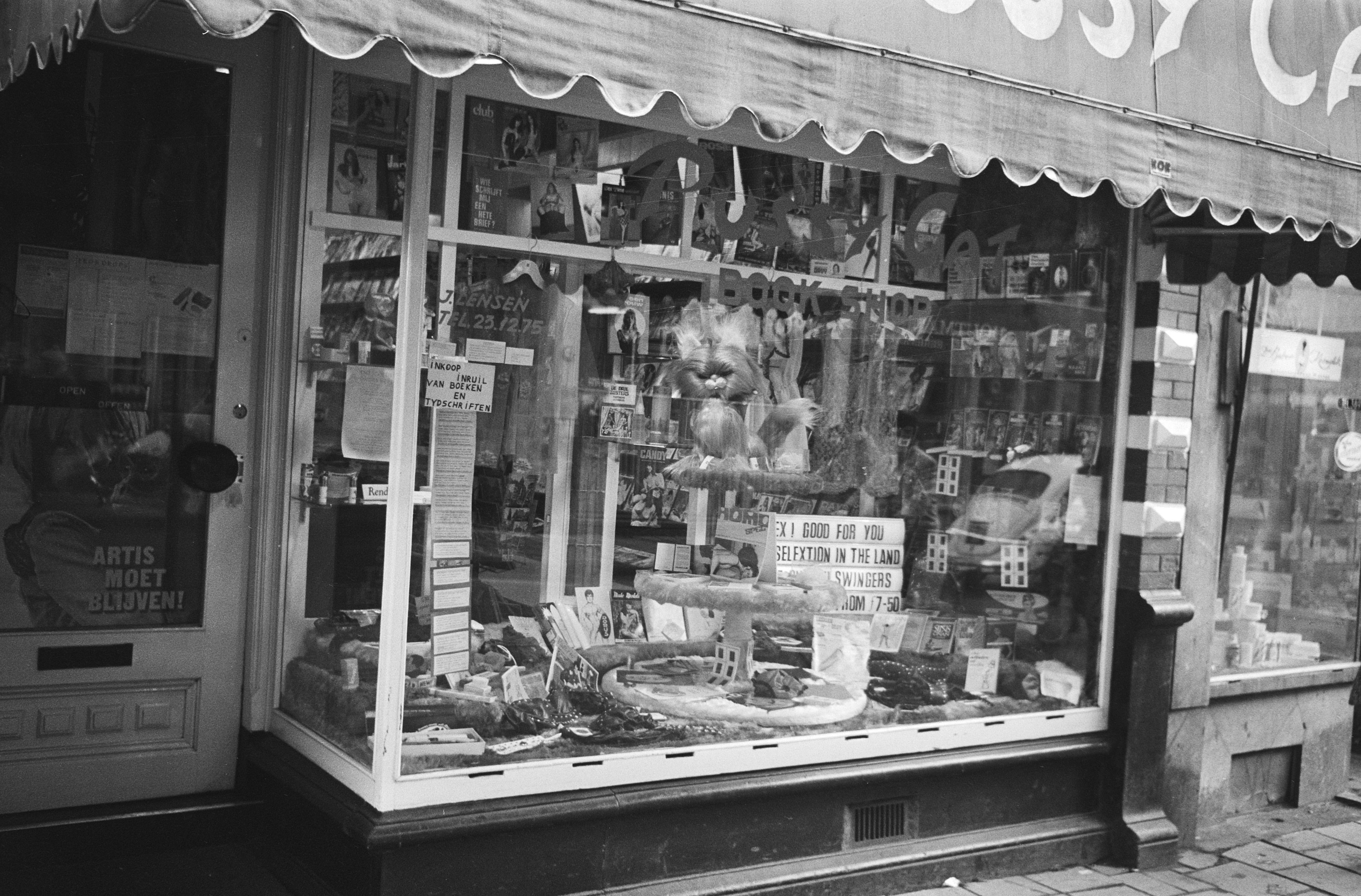
Pussy Cat Bookshop Amsterdam (1971)

The first sex shops in the Netherlands were opened in the early 1970s, by entrepreneurs like Beate Uhse and Lasse Braun. The world's first Muslim-aimed online sex shop called El Asira opened in the Netherlands in 2010. It had 70,000 hits to the website in the first four days of operation.

=== Russia ===
In Russia, sex shops are often criticized by public and political figures, often of a conservative nature. In May 2017, State Duma Deputy from United Russia Vitaly Milonov addressed the head of the Ministry of Health, Veronika Skvortsova, with the initiative to equate intimate products with medicinal products. According to Milonov, it is necessary to introduce control over the distribution of intimate goods: "The use and application of such products will occur exclusively as prescribed by a doctor."

In 2018, Milonov proposed closing all sex shops in Russia. In his opinion, all sex shops in Russia should disappear along with advertising since only "sick people" shop there. This is in contrast to his position in 2013 when he only called for reducing the number of sex shops in St. Petersburg.

=== Singapore ===
Sex shops are extremely rare in Singapore. A few had been opened by 2005, but only about 1–2 currently exist. These shops mainly sell lingerie, condoms, BDSM tools, genuine enhancement pills, tenga items and various sex toys. Their goods can be seen through a store window.

=== South Africa ===
After Nelson Mandela backed the anti-discrimination law that legalised sex toys, "Adult World" was established in 1994 as South Africa's first sex shop. Adult World came to operate a total of 52 shops within South Africa and 15 shops in Australia. Many religious Christian communities believed that the use of these adult lifestyle centres would lead to higher crime rates and attempted to organise mass demonstrations at their opening to force the closure of Adult World. In July 1998, Adult World opened their largest adult lifestyle shop in Parow, Cape Town which they named "Adult World Warehouse". The adult movie star Christi Lake attended the opening of the shop, where a protest march of over 500 people brought traffic to a standstill. During the next couple of days, the protesters held placards which proclaimed "Real men don't need pornography" and "Protect our people from banned pornography". When the shop was opened, it was found that 70% of the customer base were women who wished to learn more about adult lifestyle products. As Adult World grew more popular, a focus on the development of adult shops within Australia took place.

=== Spain ===
Sex shops in Spain did not appear until after the end of the Francoist dictatorship in 1975. The first sex shop opened in Spain was Kitsch in Madrid in 1978. Many subsequently opened across the country.

=== United Kingdom ===
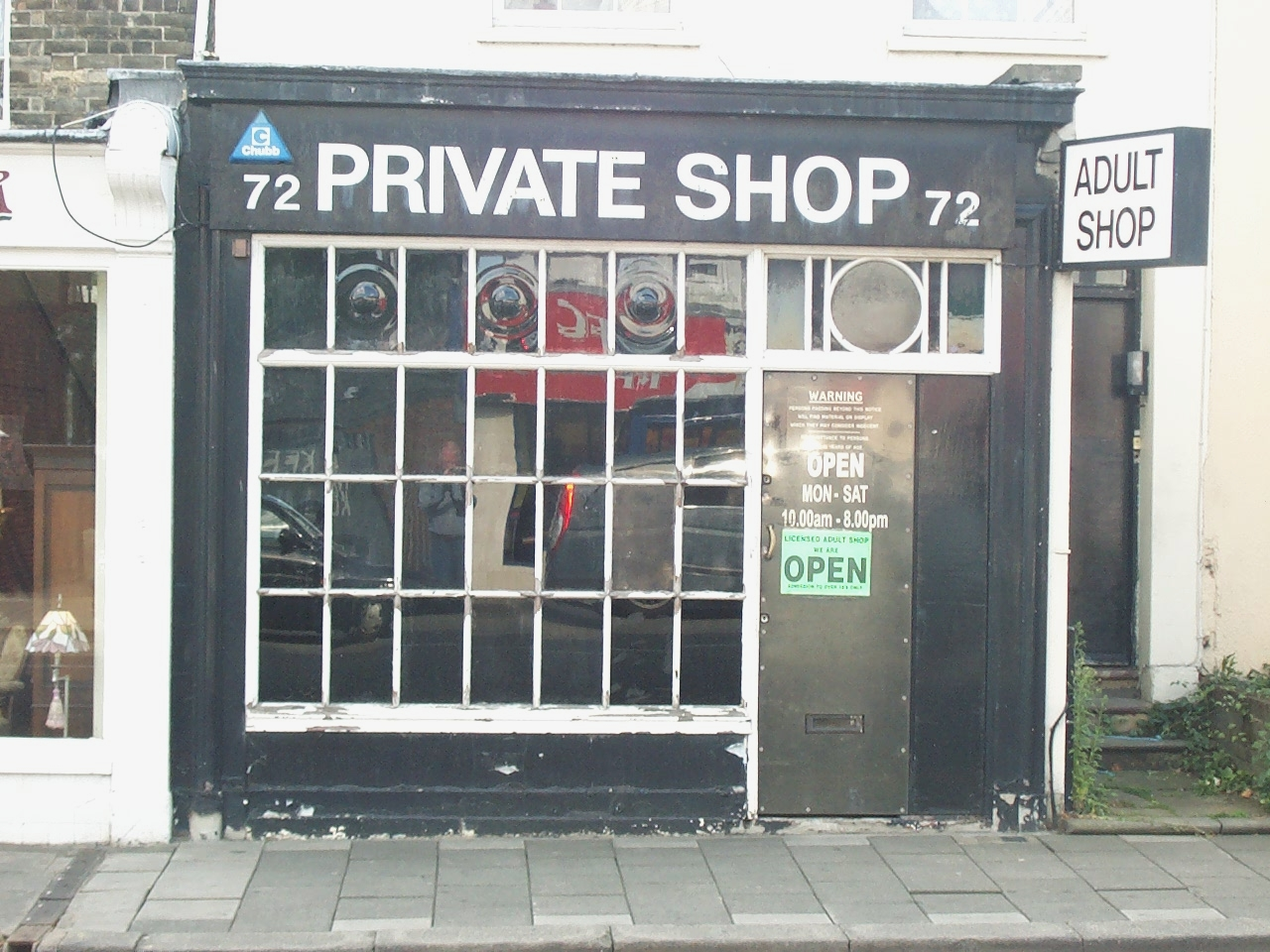
A sex shop in Bedford photographed in 2007. It has blacked-out windows because it is illegal for sex shops in the United Kingdom to display their goods in the window.

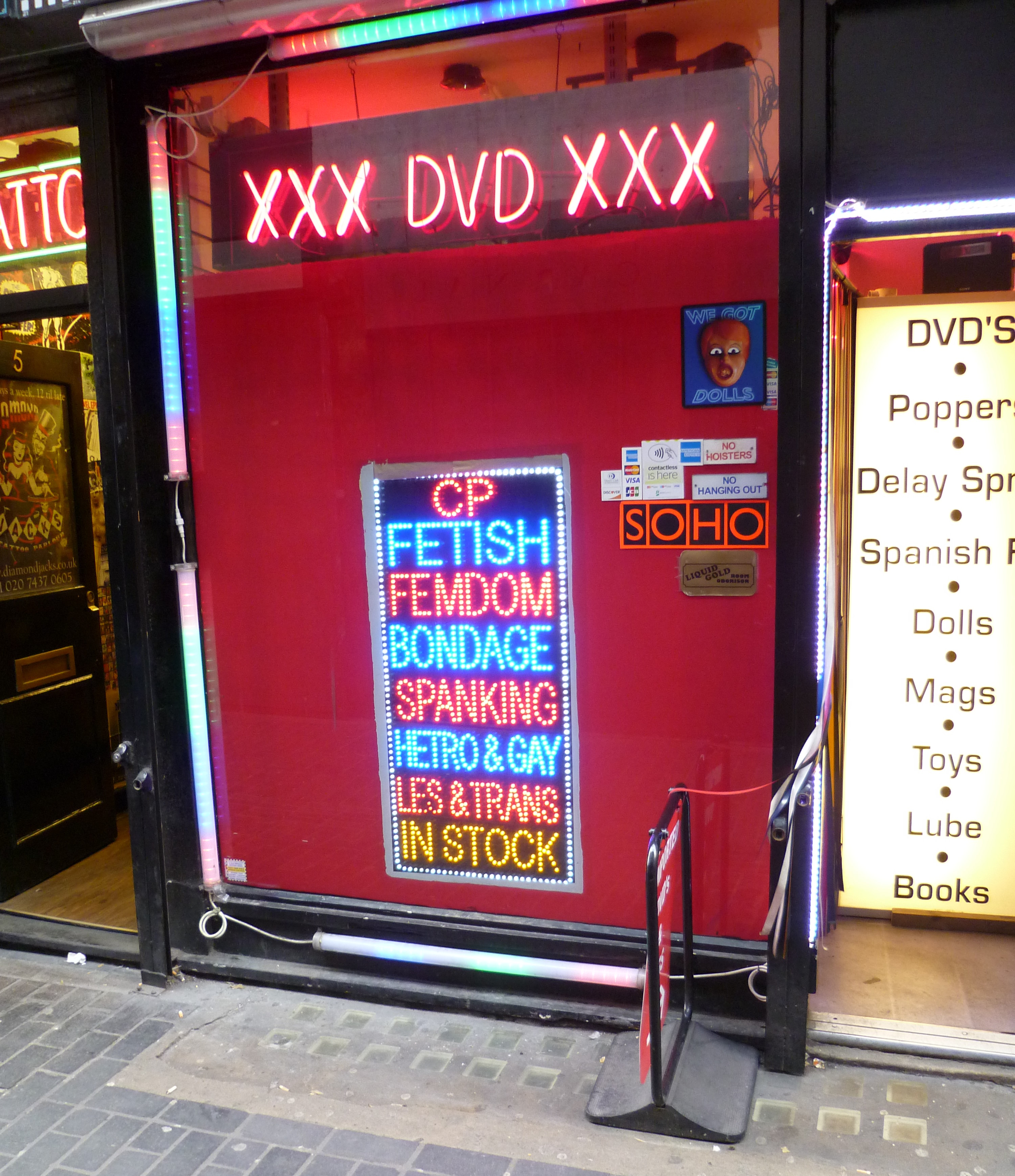
A sex shop in Walker's Court, Soho, London

Almost all licensed adult stores in the UK are forbidden from having their wares in open shop windows under the Indecent Displays Act 1981, which means often the shop fronts are boarded up or covered in posters. A warning sign must be clearly shown at the entrance to the store, and no sex articles (for example, pornography or sex toys) should be visible from the street. However, lingerie, non-offensive covers of adult material, etc. may be shown depending on the licence conditions of the local authority. The Video Recordings Act 1984 introduced the R18-rated classification for videos that are only available in licensed sex shops. No customer can be under 18 years old.

In London, few boroughs have licensed sex shops. In the district of Soho within the City of Westminster a handful of sex shops were opened by Carl Slack in the early 1960s, and by the mid-1970s the number had grown to 59. Some had nominally "secret" backrooms selling hardcore photographs and novels, including Olympia Press editions.

In 1978, the businessman David Sullivan opened the "Private Shop", the first of his chain of sex shops which went on to expand across the UK. The Local Government (Miscellaneous Provisions) Act 1982 required sex shops to apply for a sex establishment licence from their local authority. As a result hundreds of sex shops were closed. There followed purges of corrupt police officers, along with new and tighter licensing controls by the City of Westminster, led to a crackdown on illegal premises in Soho. In the early 1990s, London's Hackney council sought to shut down Sh! Women's Erotic Emporium, because they did not have a licence. Sh! took the council to court and consequently won the right to remain open, as there were no sufficient reasons for the closure.

In 2003, the Ann Summers chain of lingerie and sex toy shops won the right to advertise for shop assistants in Job Centres, which was originally banned under restrictions on what advertising could be carried out by the sex industry. In 2007, a Northern Ireland sex shop was denied a licence by the Belfast City Council. The shop appealed and won, but this was overturned by the House of Lords.

The licensing or closing of unlicensed sex shops, along with cultural changes such as the substantial relaxation of general censorship and the ready availability of non-commercial sex, and the availability of sexual material online, have reduced the red-light district of Soho to just a small area. The borough has 15 licensed sex shops and several remaining unlicensed ones. Islington and Camden each have multiple sex shops; the former also has three pornographic cinemas.

Sex shops in Scotland are regulated under the Civic Government (Scotland) Act 1982.

=== United States ===
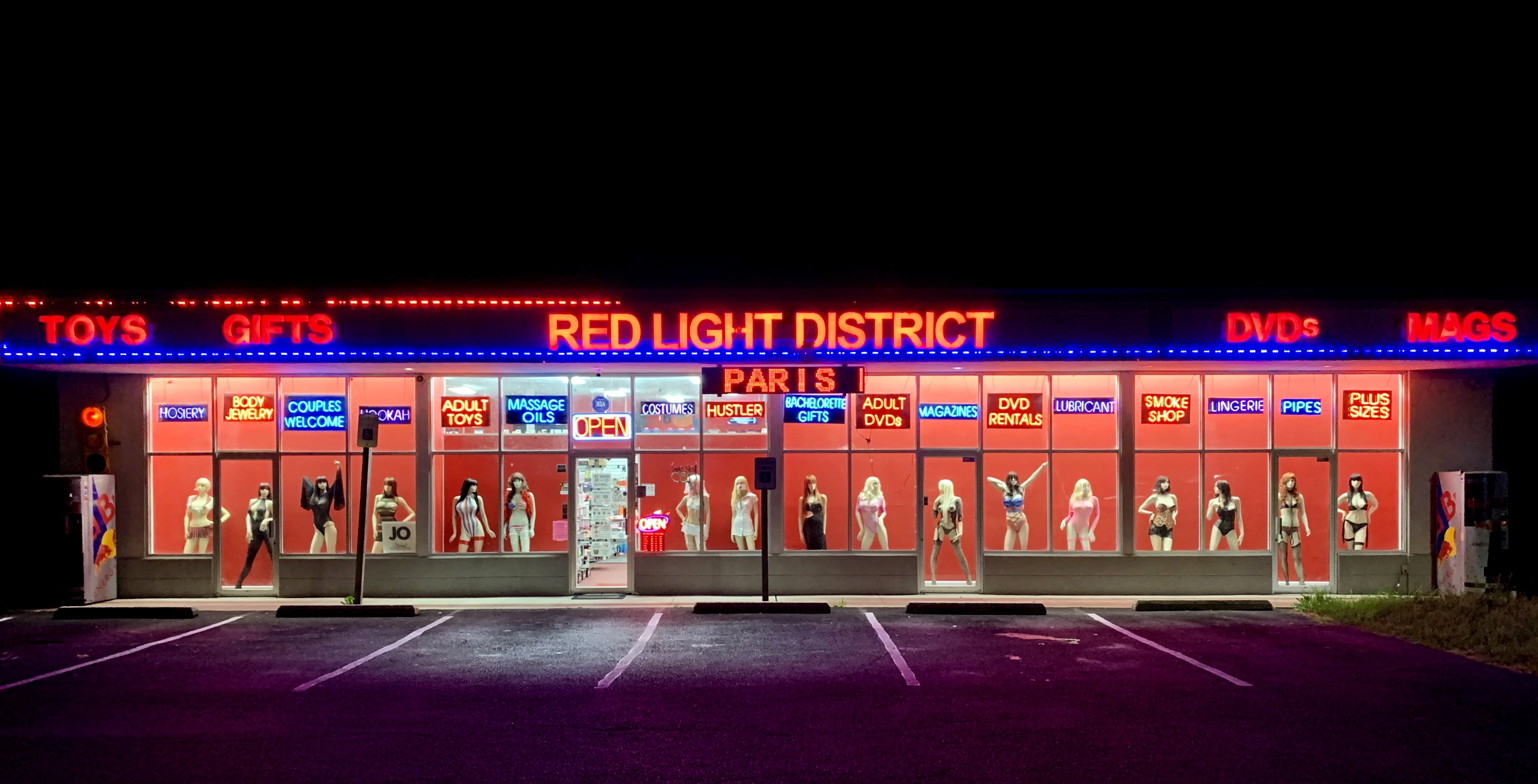
A sex shop in Ocean City, Maryland

In the United States, a series of Supreme Court decisions in the 1960s (based on the First Amendment to the United States Constitution) generally legalized sex shops, while still allowing states and local jurisdictions to limit them through zoning. Zoning regulations often caused shops to be located either on the outskirts of town, or clumped into a single area, creating a type of red light district of adult stores and businesses.

Into the 1980s, nearly all American sex shops were oriented to an almost entirely male clientele. Many included adult video arcades, and nearly all were designed so that their customers could not be seen from the street: they lacked windows, and the doors often involved an L-shaped turn so that people on the street could not see in. In addition, during the late 1980s and early 1990s, stores that also had theaters or arcades were sometimes closed by government order, citing the spread of AIDS as the motive.

On the one hand, there are stores resembling the UK's Ann Summers, tending toward "softer" product lines. On the other hand, there are stores that evolved specifically out of a sex-positive culture, such as San Francisco's Good Vibrations and Xandria. The latter class of stores tend to be very consciously community-oriented businesses, sponsoring lecture series and being actively involved in sex-related health issues, etc.

== See also ==
- Erotic furniture
- Sex machine
