= Xandria Collection =

Xandria was one of the largest distributors of sex toys and adult videos, books and novelty items in the United States. It began as a catalog of sexual aids for people with disabilities at a time when the disability rights movement was in its infancy. Xandria was also one of the first companies to sell sex-related items online. The business closed in 2016 when Lawrence Research Group, Inc., which operated the business, filed for dissolution with the Nevada Secretary of State.

== History ==
Xandria was founded in 1974 by Gaye Raymond, a San Francisco physical therapy professor, and her husband, Victoria's Secret founder Roy Raymond. Gaye Raymond's philosophy was that people with disabilities should be able to enjoy as much of life as possible, including an active sex life. Xandria began as a catalog-based distributor of sexual aids for people with physical and developmental disabilities.

The original Xandria Collection offered mostly educational adult videos and books, as well as vibrators and sex toys that were easier to grasp and maneuver by people who had physical impairments due to an amputation or illness.

The company's guarantee of privacy, product quality and personal satisfaction helped it develop a following among the general public, especially among those who didn't want to be seen entering their local porn shop.

Xandria's products were shipped in discreet packages that did not bear the company's name. Customers could request a refund within 60 days if they were not satisfied with their sex toys for any reason.

Gaye and Roy Raymond sold the Xandria Collection in 1984 and the company's inventory was expanded to appeal to the general public. In addition to a catalog for people with disabilities, the company began selling condoms, erotica, dildos, lubricants, vibrating cock rings, triple crowns, penis pumps, lingerie, masturbation aids, and other sex-related products. In 1999, it also began carrying explicit sex videos distributed by sister company 1st Skin.

The company's new owners also created an advisory board of health and sex experts. Members included sex educator, activist and author Betty Dodson; journalist and author Michael Castleman, who penned the Playboy Magazine Advisor from 1991 to 1995; and clinical psychologist Louanne Cole, who now serves as resident expert for WebMD's "Sex Matters."

Xandria was initially headquartered in San Francisco. It moved to Brisbane, California in 1993 and to its final location in the Las Vegas Valley in 2005.

In 1997, the company launched Xandria.com, one of the first online stores dedicated to selling sex toys and adult videos. The site and the company itself have generated positive press from well-known publications such as Playboy, Esquire, Hustler, and Men's Fitness.

In its final phase, customers could order items through the mail and by calling a toll free number, but most of the company's sales were generated through its website. Xandria did not have a physical store. Xandria.com carried a long list of sex-related items, as well as articles on sexual health written by well-known authors.

Several sex toys from the Xandria Collection were featured in the 2007 film Stash, an indie comedy starring Tim Kazurinsky and Marilyn Chambers. The film is about "Discreet Removals," a company that will remove people's stashes of pornography and sex toys after their death, so that unsuspecting spouses and family members can "concentrate on grieving". Stash won the 2007 Gold Remi Award for excellence in the category of Mature Audience Narrative Feature" at the WorldFest Houston International Film Festival.

== See also ==
- Sex manual
- Sex shop
- Dildos
- Vibrators
