= Xanthostha =

Scientific classification
- Kingdom: Animalia
- Phylum: Arthropoda
- Class: Insecta
- Order: Lepidoptera
- Superfamily: Noctuoidea
- Family: Erebidae
- Subfamily: Calpinae
- Genus: Xanthostha; Hampson, 1926
- Species: X. xantharia

Binomial name
- Xanthostha xantharia Walker, 1866

Genus of moths

Xanthostha is a monotypic moth genus of the family Erebidae erected by George Hampson in 1926. Its only species, Xanthostha xantharia, was first described by Francis Walker in 1866. It is found in the Amazon region.
