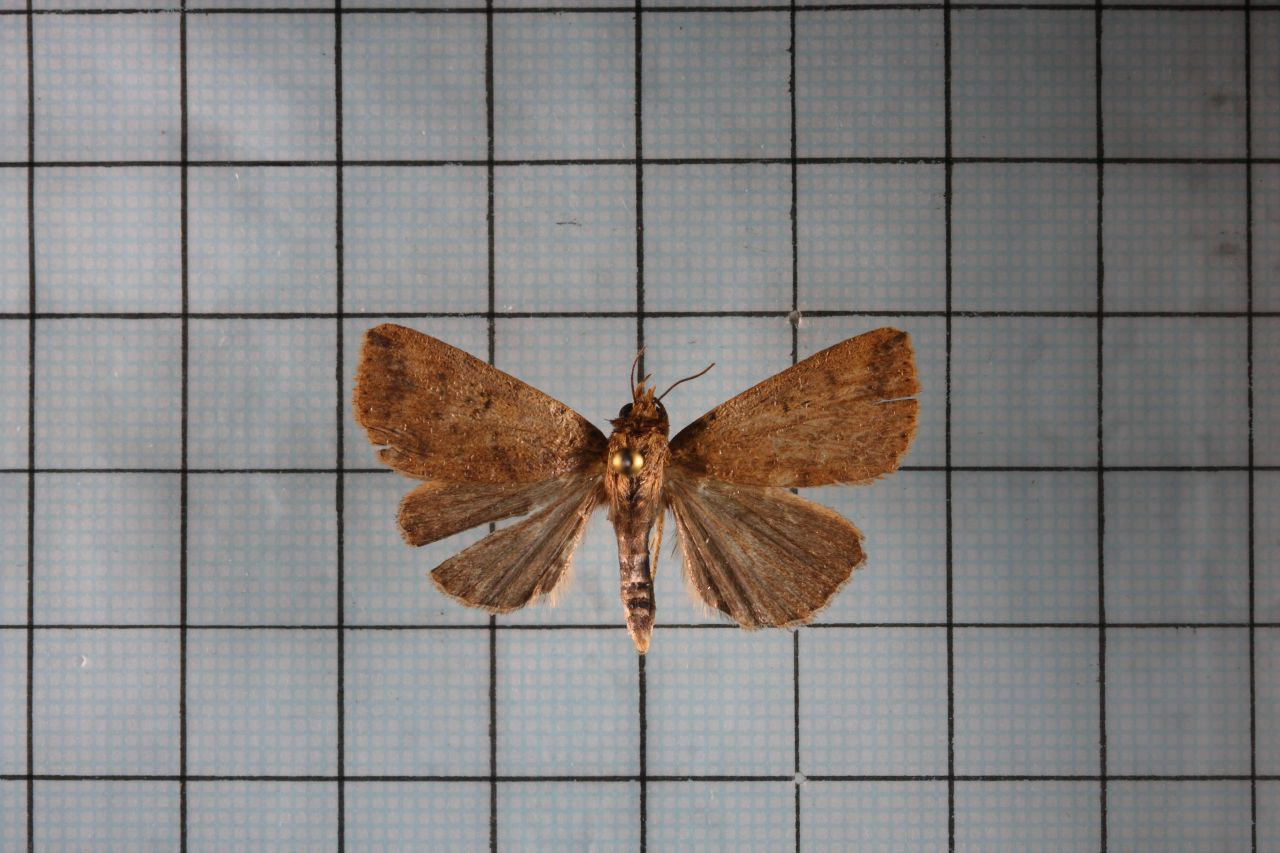
- Xylostola indistincta

Scientific classification
- Kingdom: Animalia
- Phylum: Arthropoda
- Class: Insecta
- Order: Lepidoptera
- Superfamily: Noctuoidea
- Family: Noctuidae
- Genus: Xylostola; Hampson, 1908

= Xylostola =

Genus of moths

Xylostola is a genus of moths of the family Noctuidae.

== Species ==
- Xylostola indistincta (Moore, 1882)
- Xylostola novimundi Dyar, 1919
- Xylostola olivata Hampson, 1909
- Xylostola punctum Berio, 1955
