= Beate Uhse Group BV =

German adult entertainment retailer

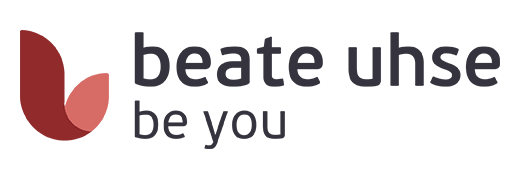
- Company type: Public (FWB: USE)
- Industry: Retailing
- Founded: 1946
- Founder: Beate Uhse-Rotermund
- Headquarters: Veendam, Netherlands
- Area served: >60 countries worldwide
- Products: Sex shops

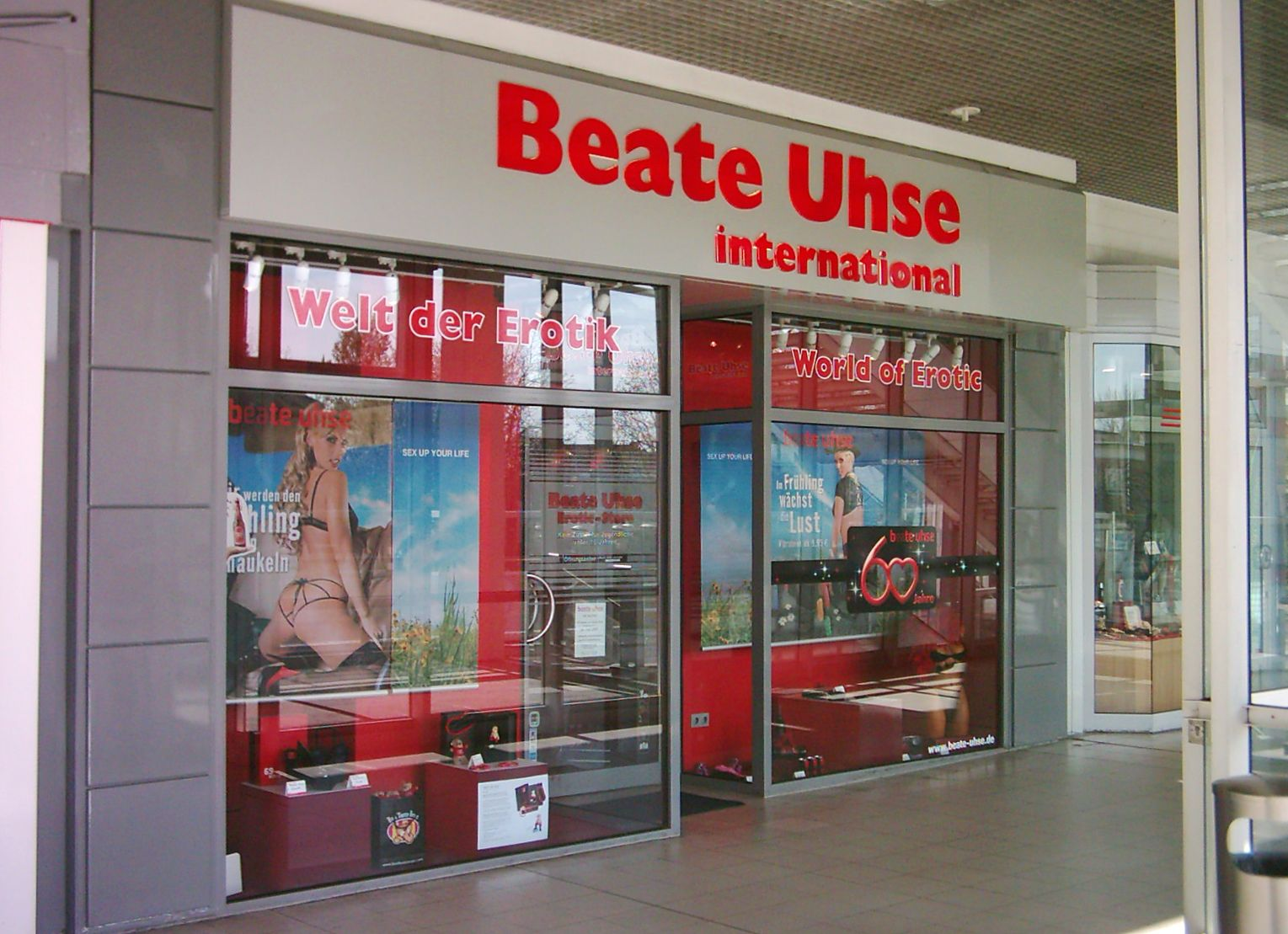
Beate Uhse shop

Beate Uhse Group BV (formerly Beate Uhse AG) is a German industry group which focuses on selling adult entertainment in the form of sex toys, lingerie, clothing and pornography. It is the most successful company in the German sex industry, and the country's leading pornography retailer.

It operates in the three business units Retail, Mail Order and Wholesale. The Entertainment division was sold to tmc Content Group AG in September 2016.

It currently has over 1,500 employees. It is active in 60 countries and has been listed on the Frankfurt Stock Exchange since 1999. The company's founder, Beate Uhse-Rotermund, remained the chairwoman of the company until her death in 2001. In 2004, the company opened the first Mae B. shop, one of what was to become a chain of sex shops specifically aimed at female consumers. In 2004, the combined sales of the Beate Uhse industry group was €280 million, making it the largest distributor of adult-related entertainment and products in the world. Profits dropped significantly between 2006 and 2007.

As of 30 September 2007, the company employed 1,425 people and generated sales of just under €271 million in 2006. In 2009, just under €231 million were implemented, the number of employees at the end of the year 1,222. In 2010, €197.7 million were implemented, the number of employees was 975. In 2012, €144 million were still implemented, the number of employees was 704. In 2015, sales amounted to €128 million. The number of employees was 600 in 2016. 150 jobs were to be reduced. 16 of the 78 stores, including 3 in Germany, were to be closed.

Since 2020, the company has been listed as Beate Uhse Group BV and headquartered in Veendam, Netherlands.

== History ==
The company was founded by former German war-time pilot and sex pioneer Beate Uhse-Rotermund in 1946 and started out as a distributor of pamphlets on family planning called Schrift X (Document X) which was a major success. In 1962, the company opened the world's first sex shop in Flensburg, West Germany. When pornography in Germany was finally made legal in West Germany in 1976, Beate Uhse was well-prepared with a widely known and respected brand name and an established mail order business. By 1992, it owned 30 sex shops and 25 cinemas, had a turnover of 100 million Deutschmarks, and 10 million customers visited its premises.

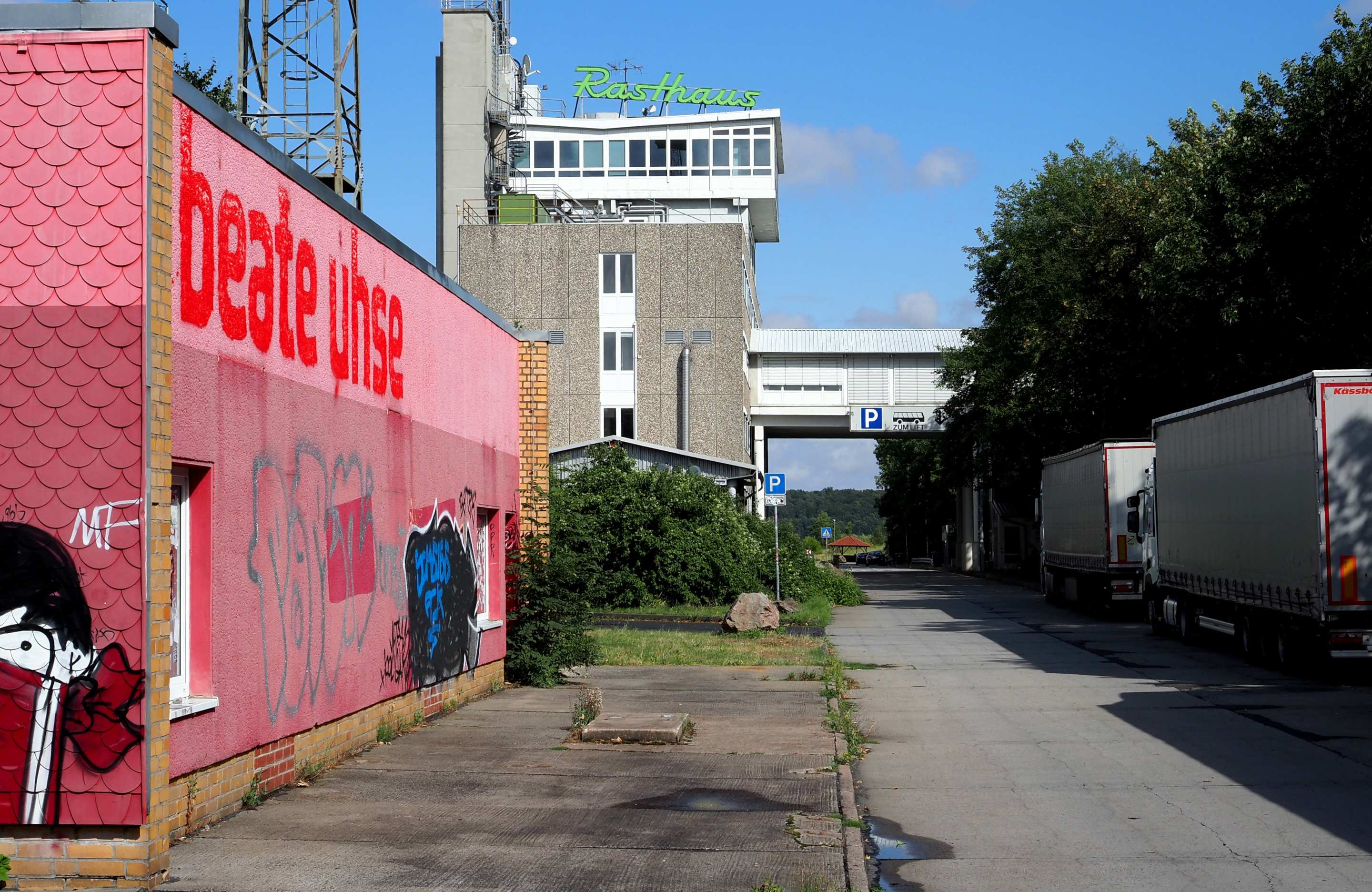
Closed Beate Uhse shop at an inner German border crossing point

== Bankruptcy ==
With the upcoming of free internet pornography, paid services suffered decline.

On 15 December 2017, the company filed for insolvency in self-administration.
