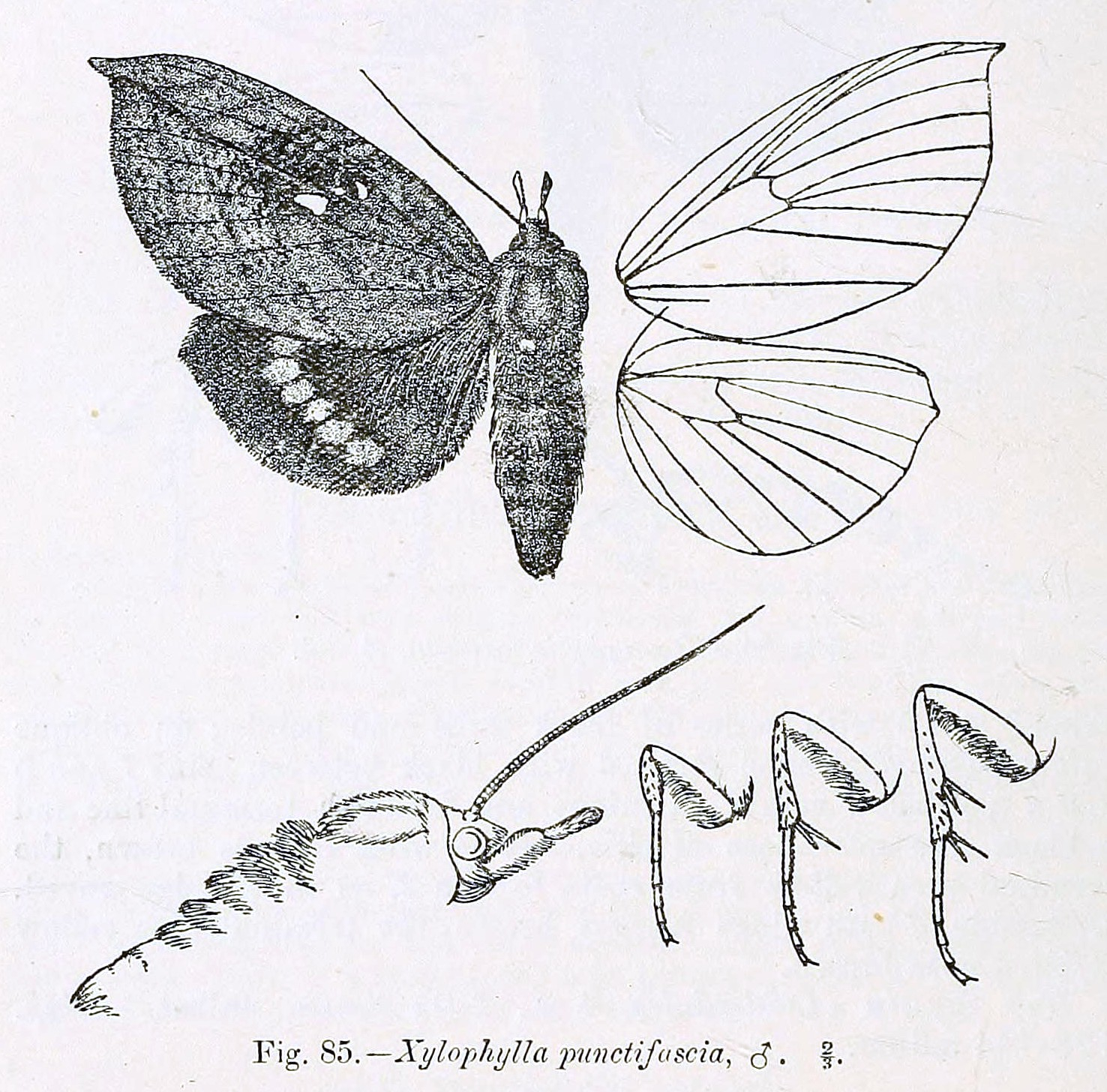

Scientific classification
- Kingdom: Animalia
- Phylum: Arthropoda
- Class: Insecta
- Order: Lepidoptera
- Superfamily: Noctuoidea
- Family: Noctuidae (?)
- Subfamily: Catocalinae
- Genus: Xylophylla; Hampson, 1913
- Species: X. punctifascia

Binomial name
- Xylophylla punctifascia Leech, 1900

= Xylophylla =

Genus of moths

Xylophylla is a monotypic moth genus of the family Noctuidae erected by George Hampson in 1913. Its only species, Xylophylla punctifascia, was first described by John Henry Leech in 1900. It is found in China.
