= Xyliodes =

Scientific classification
- Kingdom: Animalia
- Phylum: Arthropoda
- Class: Insecta
- Order: Lepidoptera
- Superfamily: Noctuoidea
- Family: Erebidae
- Subfamily: Calpinae
- Genus: Xyliodes; Guenée, 1857
- Species: X. fortunaria

Binomial name
- Xyliodes fortunaria Guenée, 1857

Genus of moths

Xyliodes is a monotypic moth genus of the family Erebidae. Its only species, Xyliodes fortunaria, is found in northern China. Both the genus and the species were first described by Achille Guenée in 1857.
