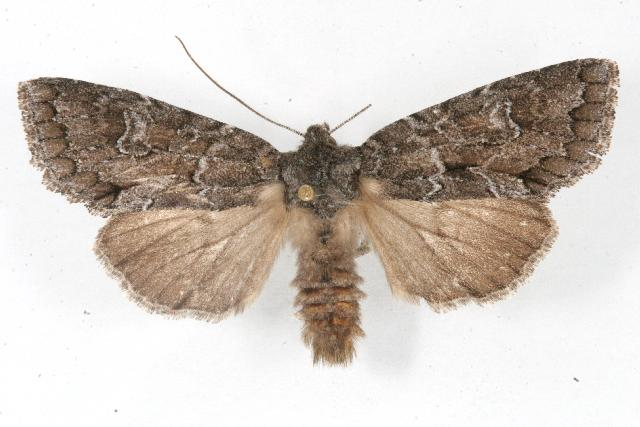
- Xylotype arcadia

Scientific classification
- Kingdom: Animalia
- Phylum: Arthropoda
- Class: Insecta
- Order: Lepidoptera
- Superfamily: Noctuoidea
- Family: Noctuidae
- Subtribe: Antitypina
- Genus: Xylotype; Hampson, 1906

= Xylotype =

Genus of moths

Xylotype is a genus of moths of the family Noctuidae.

== Species ==
- Xylotype arcadia Barnes & Benjamin, 1922
- Xylotype capax (Grote, 1868)
