= Xylomania =

Scientific classification
- Missing taxonomy template (fix): Xylomania

Genus of moths

Xylomania is a genus of moths of the family Noctuidae.
