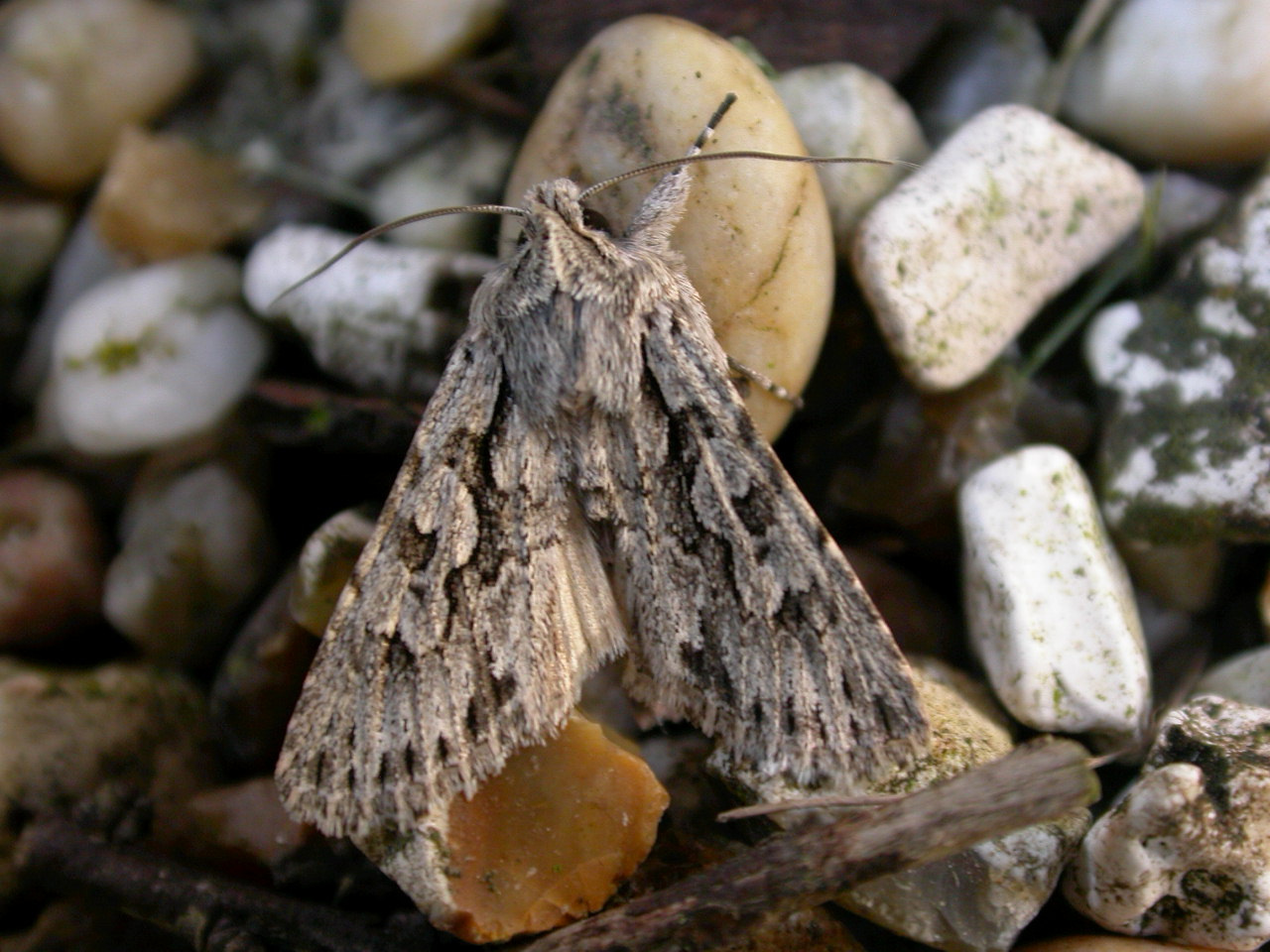

Scientific classification
- Domain: Eukaryota
- Kingdom: Animalia
- Phylum: Arthropoda
- Class: Insecta
- Order: Lepidoptera
- Superfamily: Noctuoidea
- Family: Noctuidae
- Subfamily: Amphipyrinae
- Genus: Xylocampa; Guenée, 1837

= Xylocampa =

Genus of moths

Xylocampa is a genus of moths of the family Noctuidae erected by the French entomologist, Achille Guenée in 1837.

== Species ==
- Xylocampa areola (Esper, 1789)
- Xylocampa mustapha (Oberthür, 1920)
