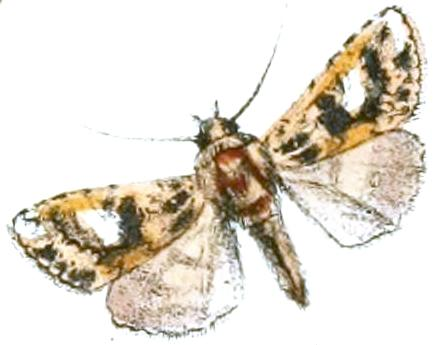
- Xenotrachea albidisca

Scientific classification
- Kingdom: Animalia
- Phylum: Arthropoda
- Clade: Pancrustacea
- Class: Insecta
- Order: Lepidoptera
- Superfamily: Noctuoidea
- Family: Noctuidae
- Subfamily: Noctuinae
- Genus: Xenotrachea; Sugi, 1958

= Xenotrachea =

Genus of moths

Xenotrachea is a genus of moths of the family Noctuidae.

== Species ==
- Xenotrachea albidisca (Moore, 1867)
- Xenotrachea aurantiaca (Hampson, 1894)
- Xenotrachea auroviridis (Moore, 1867)
- Xenotrachea chrysochlora (Hampson, 1908)
- Xenotrachea leucopera (Hampson, 1908)
- Xenotrachea niphonica Kishida & Yoshimoto, 1979
- Xenotrachea tsinlinga (Draudt, 1950)
