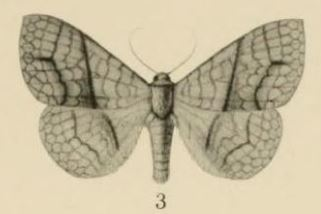

Scientific classification
- Kingdom: Animalia
- Phylum: Arthropoda
- Class: Insecta
- Order: Lepidoptera
- Superfamily: Noctuoidea
- Family: Erebidae
- Subfamily: Calpinae
- Genus: Xanthodesma; Aurivillius, 1910

= Xanthodesma =

Genus of moths

Xanthodesma is a genus of moths of the family Erebidae. The genus was erected by Per Olof Christopher Aurivillius in 1910.

== Species ==
Species of this genus are:

- Xanthodesma aurantiaca Aurivillius, 1910
- Xanthodesma aurata Aurivillius, 1910
- Xanthodesma rectangulata Kenrick, 1917
