= Xandria (moth) =

Scientific classification
- Domain: Eukaryota
- Kingdom: Animalia
- Phylum: Arthropoda
- Class: Insecta
- Order: Lepidoptera
- Superfamily: Noctuoidea
- Family: Noctuidae
- Subfamily: Cuculliinae
- Genus: Xandria

Genus of moths

Xandria is a genus of moths of the family Noctuidae.

They belong to the order Lepidoptera
