= Sh! Women's Erotic Emporium =

Erotic store in London

Coordinates: 51°31′38.2″N 0°4′55.5″W

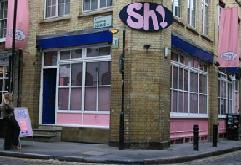
The Sh! store in Hoxton Square, London

Sh! Women's Erotic Emporium is a British sex shop with a retail store in the Hoxton, London and an online store. The business was established in 1992 by Kathryn Hoyle and Sophie Walters.

== History ==
The first Sh! Women's Erotic Emporium store was opened in 1992 on Hoxton square, in the Hoxton neighbourhood of London. In 2017, the store relocated to Pitfield Street also located in Hoxton.

== Cultural impact ==
In 1992, Hoyle discovered the Rabbit vibrator named "Roger Rabbit" in a sex toy warehouse. She branded hers "Jessica Rabbit," which became renowned from its appearance on television shows, including Sex and the City. Cosmopolitan ran an article on female masturbation in 1999, resulting in sales increasing.

== Projects ==
Sh! runs educational workshops and collaborates with National Health Service trusts in providing sex toys for women with sexual difficulties.

=== 2003 International Sexology Conference ===
In 2003, Adeola Agbebiyi from the Barts and the London NHS Trust, and Kathryn Hoyle and Angel Zatorski, both from Sh! Women's Emporium, presented two papers exploring the relationship between women and sex toys.

== Awards ==
Sh! has been awarded Ethical Consumer status by ethicalconsumer.org, the 2005 Erotic Awards Special Judges Award, and the 2007 Readers' Poll 'Best Adult Store Online' and 'Best LGBT friendly business'. In 2008 the business was awarded the Readers' Poll 'Best Online Retailer' award.
