= Xoria =

Scientific classification
- Domain: Eukaryota
- Kingdom: Animalia
- Phylum: Arthropoda
- Class: Insecta
- Order: Lepidoptera
- Superfamily: Noctuoidea
- Family: Erebidae
- Subfamily: Hypeninae
- Genus: Xoria; Nye, 1975

Species
- Xoria filifera (Walker, 1869)

Synonyms
- Generic: Orixa Walker, 1869; Specific: Orixa filifera Walker, 1869

Genus of moths

Xoria is a monotypic moth genus of the family Erebidae erected by Ian W. B. Nye in 1975. Its only species, Xoria filifera, was first described by Francis Walker in 1869. It is found in the Congo Basin.
