= International school =

School, often with foreign students or with an international curriculum

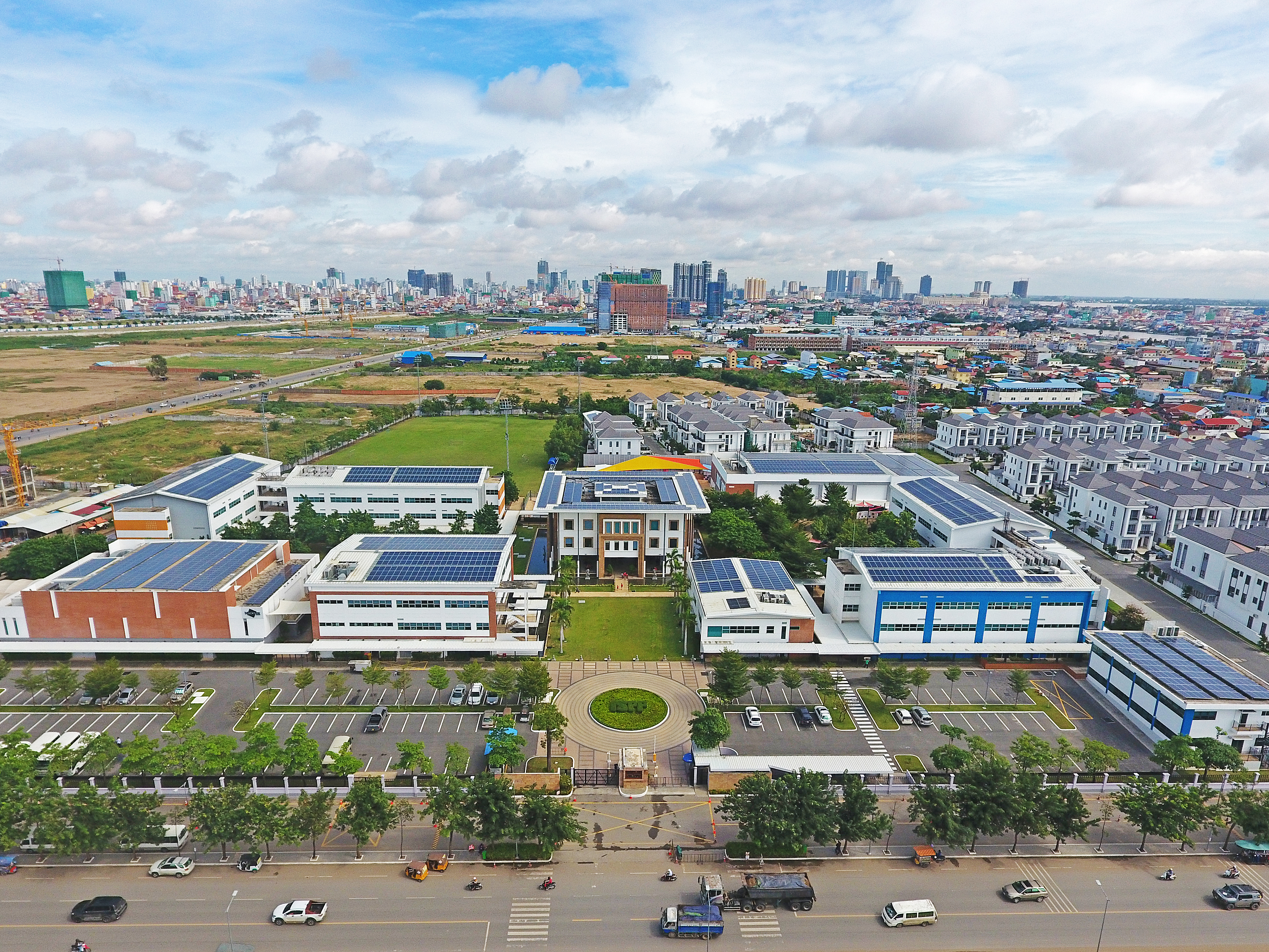
International School of Phnom Penh, Cambodia

International schools are public and private schools that promote education in an international environment or framework. Although there is no uniform definition or criteria, international schools are usually characterised by a multinational student body and staff, multilingual instruction, curricula oriented towards global perspectives and subjects, and the promotion of concepts such as world citizenship, pluralism, and intercultural understanding; most are private schools.

Many international schools adopt a curriculum from programmes and organisations such as the International Baccalaureate, Cambridge International Education, European Baccalaureate, Edexcel, FOBISIA, International Primary Curriculum, or Advanced Placement. International schools often follow a curriculum different from the host country, catering mainly to foreign students, such as members of expatriate communities, international businesses or organisations, diplomatic missions, or missionary programmes. Admission is sometimes open to local students to provide qualifications for employment or higher education in a foreign country, offer high-level language instruction, and/or foster cultural and global awareness.

== History ==
The first international school can be traced back to the International School of Geneva, founded in 1924 by Arthur Sweetser and Ludwik Rajchman with an emphasis on bilingual education (English and French). Later that year, the Yokohama International School was established in Yamate, Yokohama, Japan. These schools catered to children of expatriate families. These could include diplomats, missionaries, military members, business workers transferred to foreign office locations, etc.

An example would be children of American military personnel attending Department of Defense Dependents Schools (DoDDS).

== Criteria ==
At a conference in Italy in 2009, the International Association of School Librarianship came up with a list of criteria for describing an international school, including

- Transferability of the student's education across international schools
- A moving population (higher than in state or public schools)
- Multinational and multilingual student body
- An international curriculum
- International accreditation (e.g. Council of International Schools, International Baccalaureate, European Baccalaureate, Cambridge International Education etc.)
- A transient and multinational teacher population
- Non-selective student enrollment
- Usually, the English language of instruction, plus the obligation to take at least one additional language on

However, educators disagree on what the exact criteria should focus on. Factors such as international history, culture, and perspective within the education curriculum make a school "international". Although students' nationality plays a big part, how the education is delivered is just as important.

== Languages of instruction ==
While English-language international schools are the most numerous, many international schools teaching primarily in other languages exist. For instance, there are 140 German schools abroad which are accredited and partly funded by the German federal government through the Central Agency for German Schools Abroad (Zentralstelle für das Auslandsschulwesen) and the Federal Office of Administration (Bundesverwaltungsamt) which is part of the German government's Federal Ministry of the Interior (Bundesministerium des Innern). According to the German Foreign Office, the government's support of these schools "helps to overcome cultural barriers, to convey a modern, diverse image of our country and to strengthen German language skills in other countries."

Other examples of non-English international schools include:

- French schools abroad accredited by the French government's Agency for French Education Abroad (Agence pour l'enseignement français à l'étranger).
- Nihonjin gakkō - Japanese schools abroad accredited by the Japanese government's Ministry of Education, Culture, Sports, Science and Technology (文部科学省, Monbu-kagaku-shō).

== Curriculum ==
Curricula in English-language international schools are most often based on education in the United Kingdom, education in the United States, or curricula specifically designed for international schools, such as the International General Certificate of Secondary Education or the IB Diploma Programme. These international curricula are committed to internationalism, developing the global citizen, providing an environment for optimal learning, and teaching in an international setting that fosters understanding, independence, interdependence, and cooperation.

Like other schools, international schools teach language arts, mathematics, the sciences, humanities, the arts, physical education, information technology, and design technology. More recent developments for primary school include the IB Primary Years Programme (PYP) and International Primary Curriculum (IPC). Secondary education is provided through the relaunched IB Middle Years Programme (MYP) and redeveloped International Middle Years Curriculum (IMYC). Most recently, the launch of the International Early Years Curriculum (IEYC) in 2016 has provided an international curriculum for early years learners aged 2–5, growing to 500 schools and early years settings between 2016 and 2021. In 2013, 3,063 schools were offering the international baccalaureate curriculum in the world, and over 1000 schools offering the IEYC, IPC and/or IMYC around the world.

The curriculum could also be based on the school's original country education. Schools that are a part of the International Schools Consortium (iSC) deliver an International Standard Classification of Education (ISCED) curriculum. This is the standard curriculum for American schools. High school education includes core classes such as English, Foreign Languages, Mathematics, Physical Education, Science, Social Studies, and Fine Arts, with the addition of ESL (English as a second language) classes for students who may need them. In addition, students may select Advanced Placement (AP) programmes to prepare for college-level education, specifically in the United States.

== International school teachers ==
Faculty at international schools are usually from or certified by the standards of their country of origin.

Hiring is frequently done at large international job fairs, such as the ones held by the Council of International Schools (CIS), where schools can interview and hire several teachers at once. There are also a handful of agencies that specialize in recruiting international teachers. Over the years it has become more difficult to recruit young international teachers, partly because of security concerns and the trend towards less attractive compensation packages. In some countries, such as South Korea, recent visa changes have also made it more difficult to obtain both qualified and unqualified teachers.

== Education ==
As of 2020, 33% of international schools are categorised as bilingual, with English as the main language. 52% of international schools offer a UK style of education, around 20% offer the International Baccalaureate Programme, and 21% offer US-style education.

Statically, international school students have achieved higher examination marks compared with the global average:

- The average point score of the IBDP in international schools was 33.6 out of 45. The global average for all IBDP students was 29.63.
- In the US Advanced Placement qualification, international school students scored an average AP exam score of 3.54 compared to a global average of 2.91. The maximum score is 5.
- In International A-Levels, the percentage of A grades was 34%, while the UK average was 25.5%.

There has also been an increase in The National Curriculum of England and Cambridge Curriculum as a curriculum choice over the past 10 years. Schools are also adopting a hybrid model of teaching and learning moving forward to provide more flexibility.

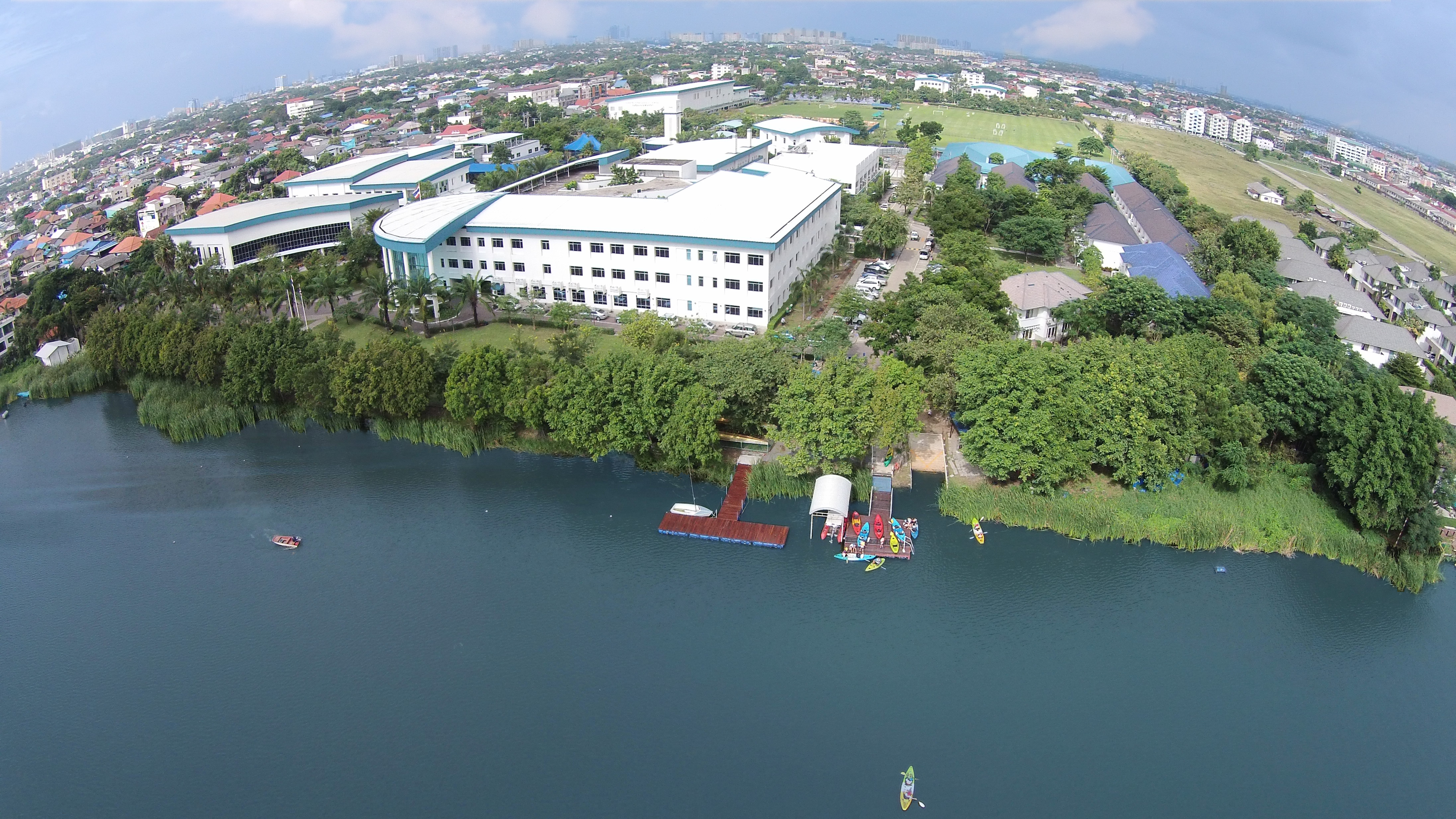
Harrow International School Bangkok, an international school in Thailand

== Growth ==
With the increase in situations such as diplomat relocation or missionary travels, there has been an increase in the demand for international schools. Especially within the start of the 20th century, there has been a growth in international schools worldwide. In 2011, 345 international schools were established. According to the ISC Research Data, there were a total of 7,655 registered international schools worldwide. That rose to 12,373 registered international schools in July 2021. The number of students attending international schools has also increased from 3.54 million to 5.68 million since 2011. In April 2007, there were 4,179 English-speaking international schools, which was expected to rise with globalisation. In New Delhi, worldwide entries for the Cambridge International General Certificate of Secondary Education (IGCSE) June 2009 examination session are up by almost 20% on the same session last year. The growth confirms the status of Cambridge IGCSE as the world's, and India's, most popular international curriculum for 14- to 16-year-olds. Asia and the Middle East are the leading geographical locations in international school growth. Enrollment in international schools located in the Middle East has grown by 20% since 2015, reaching 1.7 million enrolled students. Southeast Asia has grown by 35.5% and East Asia has grown by 33.3% since. South Asia experienced the largest jump in growth by 64.6% since 2015. In 2023, Adam Poole of the Beijing Foreign Studies University and Tristan Bunnell of the University of Bath stated that there were about 900 schools in China "that might be thought of as international schools"; according to the authors, about 66% of these schools had focused on recruiting Chinese citizen students and mostly Chinese citizen teachers, Poole and Bunnell argued that those schools "are now perhaps better classified as ‘internationalised schools’".

== Criticism ==
Hannah Smith of The Guardian wrote in 2013 that many students of international schools move between countries and places constantly. Several reported that they feel they have no one place where they have roots or background. Many international students are often referred to as third culture kids (TCKs).

== Organisations ==
International school associations and services:

- CIS
- Association of Christian Schools International
- FOBISIA
- Cognita
- International Schools Services
- Nord Anglia Education
- United World Colleges
- Quality Schools International
- Schools offering International Baccalaureate

== See also ==
International schools

- List of international schools
- Nihonjin gakkō

International school teachers

- Teaching abroad

Examinations and qualifications

- Cambridge International Education
- International General Certificate of Secondary Education
- IB Primary Years Programme
- IB Middle Years Programme
- IB Diploma Programme
- IB Career related Program
