= Beatrice Ensor =

English theosophist (1885–1974)

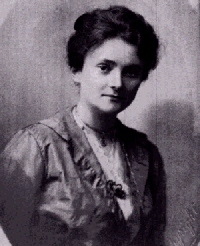
- Born: 11 August 1885; Marseille
- Died: 1974 (aged 88–89); London
- Occupation: Theosophist

Beatrice Ensor (11 August 1885 – 1974), birth name Beatrice Nina Frederica de Normann, was an English theosophical educationist and pedagogue. She was co-founder of the New Education Fellowship (later World Education Fellowship) and editor of the journal Education for the New Era.

== Early years ==
Born in Marseille on 11 August 1885, Beatrice de Normann was the eldest child of Albert Edward de Normann and Irene Matilda (née Wood). Her father was in the shipping business and her early years were spent in Marseille and Genoa, hence her fluency in Italian and French. She was greatly influenced by a theosophical book that a visitor to her home had left. This led in 1908 to her joining the Theosophical Society, which came to play an important part in her life. She had two brothers: Sir Eric de Normann (1893–1982), and Albert Wilfred Noel de Normann ("Bill").

Coming to England to complete her education, she trained as a domestic science teacher and for a short while taught the subject at a college in Sheffield. This led to her being appointed Inspector of women's and girls' education by Glamorgan County Council. She became disenchanted with the regimented and passive teaching she saw but when she inspected a Montessori school in Cheltenham, she became very interested in the ideas of Maria Montessori whom she met and corresponded with. She attended a conference in East Runton in 1914 organised by the New Ideals in Education group; the topic of the conference was 'The Montessori Method in Education'. She was a vegetarian and anti vivisectionist.

== Theosophy and St Christopher School ==
In the early months of World War I she was appointed by the Board of Education as H. M. Inspector of domestic science in South West England based in Bath. But she found civil service work uncongenial and, having played a major part in founding the Theosophical Fraternity in Education, she was invited to become Organising Secretary of the Theosophical Education Trust in 1915. In this role one of her main tasks was the consolidation of the Society's educational work at Letchworth Garden City into St Christopher School, which was co-educational and boarding, with Isabel King as its Headmistress. One of the teachers at the school for a while was V. K. Krishna Menon. She worked closely for a time with George Arundale who became the President of the Theosophical Society Adyar.

== New era in education ==
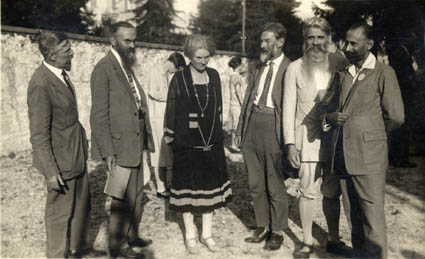
Beatrice Ensor with (left to right) Ovide Decroly, Pierre Bovet, Édouard Claparède, Paul Geheeb and Adolphe Ferrière

In 1922 through the auspices of the Save the Children Foundation she helped to bring under nourished Hungarian children to Britain for a spell to recover their health. She travelled to Budapest and returned with the first party. For this she was awarded a medal by the Hungarian Red Cross. But a more enduring role to her Theosophical role was the production, with A. S. Neill for a time as joint editor, of the Journal Education for the New Era, which still flourishes some 90 years later. Co-operating magazines in French and German followed edited by Adolphe Ferrière fr:Adolphe Ferrière and Elisabeth Rotten de:Elisabeth Rotten respectively.

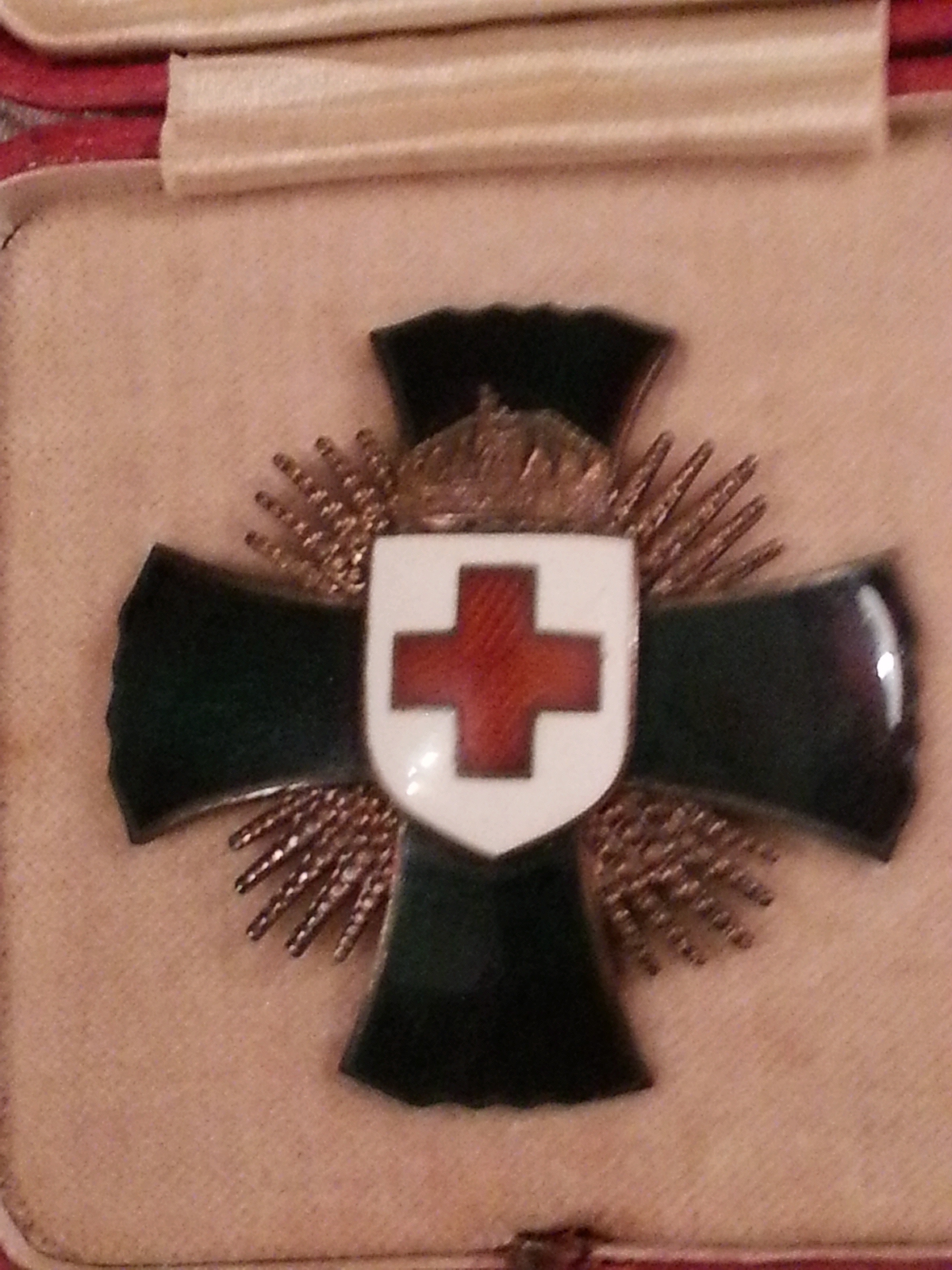

== The New (World) Education Fellowship ==
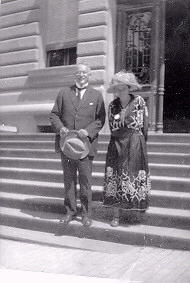
Beatrice Ensor and Carl Jung – Montreux 1923 – Second International Conference of the N.E.F.

In 1921, together with Iwan Hawliczek, Beatrice Ensor organised a conference in Calais on the 'Creative Self-Expression of the Child', with attendance of over 100. Although this was inspired by theosophists anxious to prevent another world war, what emerged was the New Education Fellowship (later the World Education Fellowship). It was a forum for new ideas in education, to "seek to find the thread of truth in all methods". It still has active sections in some 20 countries. Ensor, together with the editors of the other two journals, formed the initial organising committee of the N.E.F., which held international conferences at two yearly intervals.

The second conference of 1923 was held in Montreux, Switzerland and there she met Carl Jung whom she invited to speak at a meeting in London (where she introduced him to H. G. Wells), Emile Jacques-Dalcroze, Franz Cižek and Alfred Adler. Conferences were held at Heidelberg (1925), Locarno (1927) and Cheltenham.

In 1929 the conference was held in Kronborg Castle, Helsingör, Denmark and amongst the delegates and speakers were Maria Montessori, Rabindranath Tagore, Jean Piaget, Kurt Lewin, Adolphe Ferrière, Ovide Decroly, Helen Parkhurst, Pierre Bovet, A. S. Neill, Elisabeth Rotten, Franz Cižek, Harold Rugg, Percy Nunn, and Paul Geheeb.

Ensor was a member of the Education Advisory Committee of the Labour Party for a short while but her utopian views clashed with those of R. H. Tawney and resigned her position.

== Frensham Heights School ==
Problems within the Theosophical Education Trust led to tensions in the Letchworth community, in which the termination of Robert Ensor's appointment as Secretary of the Trust played a part. In 1925 Isabel King and Beatrice Ensor left to establish Frensham Heights, a co-educational school in Surrey, from Montessori to university entrance level, for which Edith Douglas-Hamilton, a Wills tobacco heiress, provided the capital. Some of the St Christopher staff and children moved to Frensham to form its nucleus. Two years later, Douglas-Hamilton died unexpectedly without having established the financial independence of the school. Beatrice Ensor and Isabel King did not feel they could continue; they left the school, but both remained on the board of governors for several years.

== Lecture tours and South Africa ==
Beatrice Ensor then concentrated her work on the New Era and N.E.F. and undertook two lecture trips to North America in 1926 and 1928, speaking on new movements in education in Boston, New York City, Detroit, and Chicago. She was also one of an educational group that was invited to tour Poland and visited South Africa in 1927 and 1929.

== Family and later life ==
In 1917 Beatrice de Normann married Robert Weld Ensor (died 1934), born in Loughgall, a younger son of Charles Ensor of Ardress and his wife Elizabeth Caroline Howard. He had served in the Canadian North West Mounted Police and was then a captain in the Canadian Army coming to England, fighting in France and then going on the Murmansk Expedition. It was theosophy that brought them together. They had one son, Michael, born in 1919. Annie Besant, Curuppumullage Jinarajadasa and Harold Baillie-Weaver were his godparents.

Robert Ensor moved to Louterwater in South Africa, where he acquired a large farm in a little developed valley, recently found to be suitable for the growing of deciduous fruit. The orchards he planted were just beginning to bear by 1933 when he died. This meant that Beatrice had to move to South Africa and take over the farm. This greatly restricted her educational work. She was one of a group invited to lecture in Australia in 1937, where she was awarded an honorary doctorate by the University of Western Australia, Perth. She helped the South African section of the N.E.F. and financed and had built on her farm a school for mixed race children, for whom no provision existed in the area.

When it became clear that her son would be pursuing a civil service career, just as her brothers had done, and did not want to take on the farm she sold it and moved to a house on the coast at Keurboomstrand near Plettenberg Bay. But when her family were settled in England she moved there to be with her grandchildren, living first at Blackheath, then in London, at Dolphin Square, where she died in 1974.

Michael Ensor, Beatrice Ensor and Paul Geheeb, date 1927?

== Legacy: The N.E.F. and Unesco ==
Just as theosophy had a profound influence on the N.E.F. so the N.E.F. had a profound influence on the creation of UNESCO. It was described as "the midwife at the birth of UNESCO" (Kobayashi) and has been an NGO of UNESCO since 1966 (Hiroshi Iwama). It changed its name to W.E.F. that year.
