= Pedro Rosselló (educator) =

Spanish educationist (1897-1970)

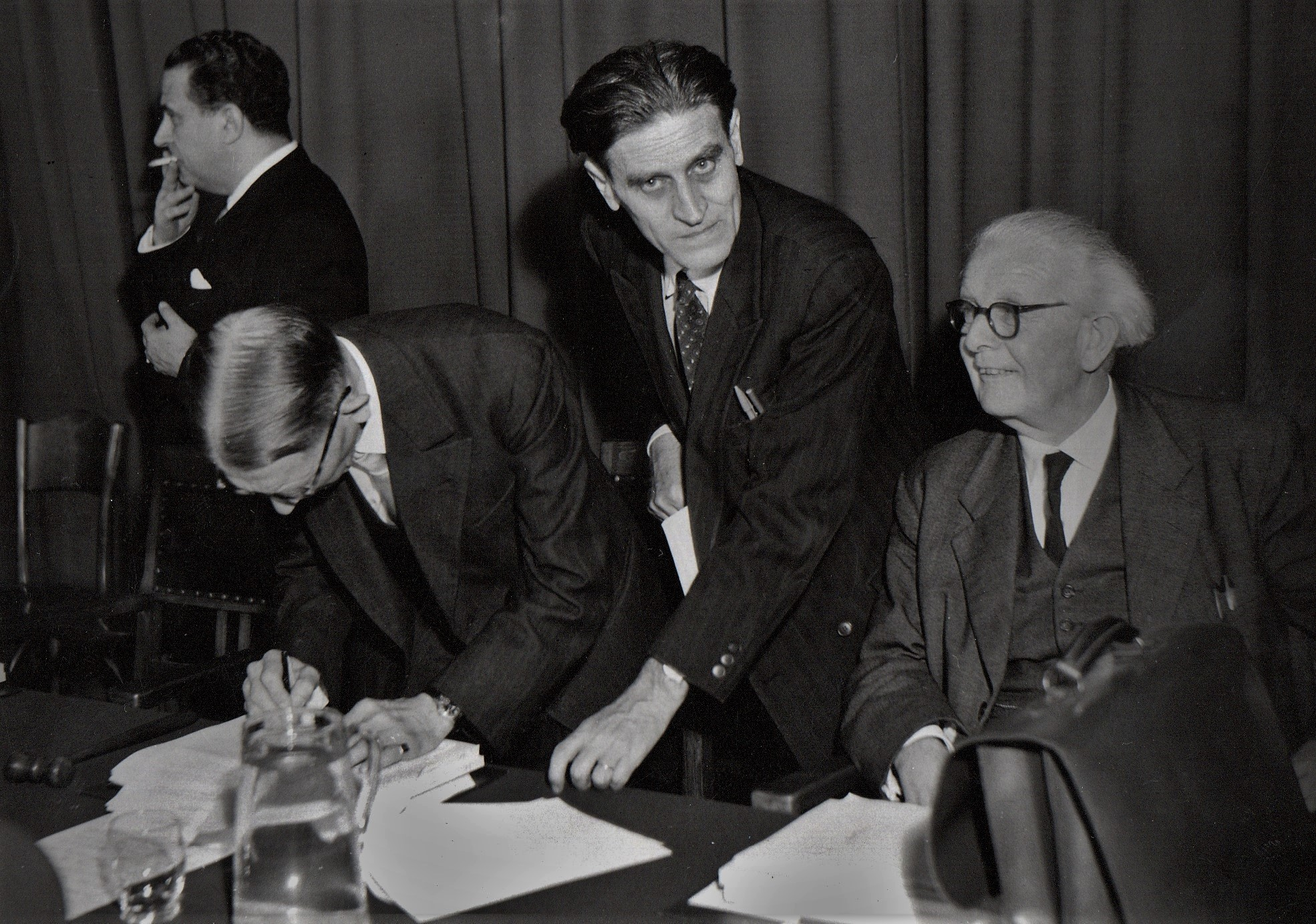
Pere Rosselló (center) with the IBE Director Jean Piaget

Pedro (Pere) Rosselló i Blanch (Calonge, Spain 1897–1970), was a Catalan lecturer and educator. He served as the deputy director of the International Bureau of Education (IBE) from 1928-1969, a position which he took over from Elisabeth Rotten. Working alongside director Jean Piaget, he played an integral role in shaping the IBE during its inception as an international organization until its merger with UNESCO in 1969.

== Career ==
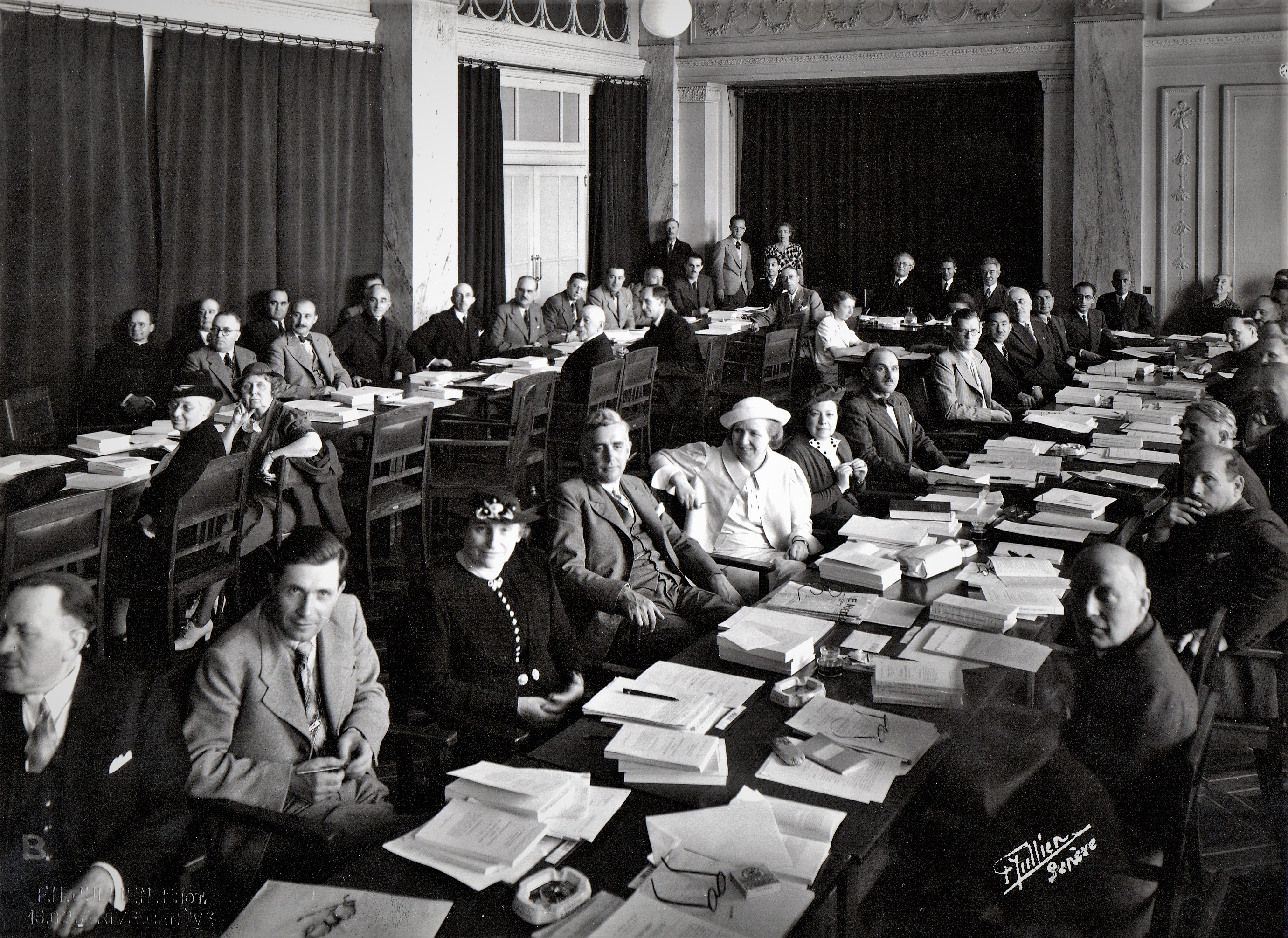
A photograph from the Seventh International Conference on Public Education in 1938, with Rosselló and Piaget sitting together in the far background. Rosselló was the IBE's main organizer of the International Conference on Public Education from 1934-1969.

Rosselló completed his studies in Education first at the Escola Normal in Girona, then at Madrid Teacher's College, and followed his graduate studies at the Geneva Institute of Sciences of Education and at the University of Lausanne, completing his doctorate in social sciences at the latter in 1934 with the dissertation "Marc-Antoine Jullien, pére de l'éducation comparée". In 1927, he became a lecturer at the Rousseau Institute in Geneva. He collaborated with fellow Rousseau Institute colleagues Edouard Claparède and Adolphe Ferrière in turning the IBE into an intergovernmental organization, a status it achieved in 1929. During that time, he was appointed deputy director, serving under director Jean Piaget. Rosselló held this position until 1969. He taught in comparative education at the Faculty of Arts at the University of Geneva in the mid-1940s, and at the Institute of Educational Sciences from 1948 to 1967.

== Main areas of focus ==
During his tenure with the IBE, Rosselló promoted the comparative approach to the international debate on education, notably through overseeing the majority of the IBE's publications on the subject, including the International Yearbook of Education. He was the chief organizer of the International Conference on Public Education, a renowned global forum dedicated to creating dialogues around educational themes and subjects, which he and Piaget were responsible for creating in 1934.
