= Ludwik Rajchman =

Polish microbiologist (1881–1965)

Ludwik W. Rajchman
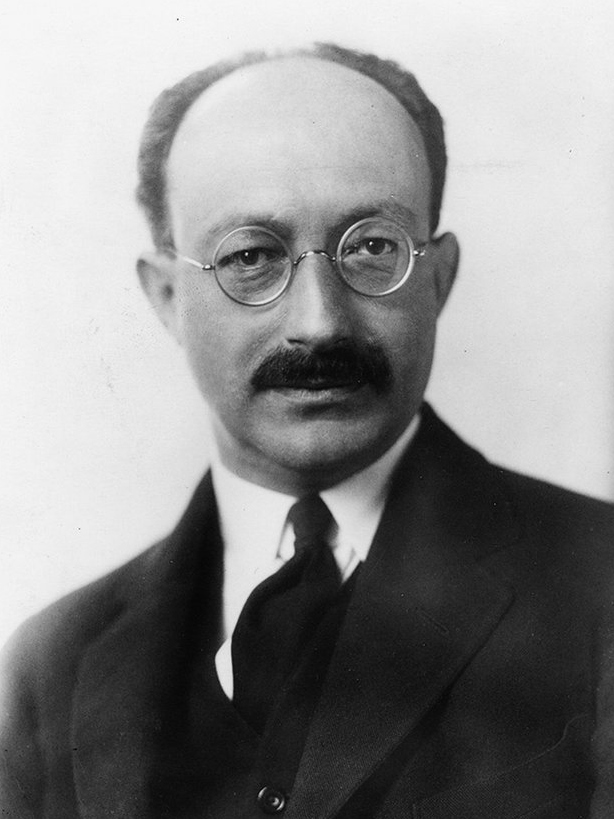
- Rajchman in the 1920s
- Born: 1 November 1881; Warsaw, Congress Poland, Russian Empire
- Died: 13 July 1965 (aged 83); Chenu, Sarthe, France
- Known for: Founding UNICEF
- Scientific career
- Fields: Bacteriology

Ludwik Witold Rajchman (Polish pronunciation: [ˈludvik ˈrajxman]; 1 November 1881 – 13 July 1965) was a Polish physician and bacteriologist. He is regarded as the founder of UNICEF, and served as its first chairman from 1946 to 1950.

== Early life and education ==
Rajchman was born to Aleksander Rajchman, the founder and first director of the Warsaw Philharmonic, and Melania Hirszfeld, a socialist and women's rights activist. He was from a family of Christianized Polish Jews. While his parents were agnostic, Ludwik was baptized at birth. He is the brother of Aleksander Rajchman, a prominent Polish mathematician and of Helena Radlińska, a Polish sociologist and he is the first cousin of Ludwik Hirszfeld, a Polish microbiologist. Ludwik Rajchman is the father of Jan A. Rajchman, a Polish computer scientist, inventor of magnetic-core memory.

Rajchman grew up in Warsaw in the difficult conditions of the Russian partition. At an early age, he and his sister Helena Rajchman became keenly aware of the social injustices in their "country" (Poland did not officially exist at the time) and were involved as teenagers in teaching young workers. As an adult, he joined the Polish Socialist Party (PPS) and was involved in the 1905 uprising and even arrested. After several months in prison he was exiled for a while to Kharkiv.

Rajchman studied medicine at the Jagiellonian University in Kraków, where he met his future wife, Marja Bojanczyk who was also a medical student. He became fascinated by bacteriology as taught to him by Odo Bujwid who had worked with Louis Pasteur.

== Career ==
Rajchman did his post-doctoral studies at the Pasteur Institute in Paris, then briefly returned to Kraków (he was banned from going to the Russian-occupied part of Poland), before being named to a prominent bacteriological laboratory in London. Rajchman and his wife and three children remained in London throughout the First World War, during which time Rajchman was kept busy also as a PPS activist lobbying for Polish independence after the war. The family returned to Warsaw in October 1918 and Rajchman (who was well acquainted with the Polish elite thanks to his family connections) persuaded the new Polish authorities to create an epidemiological center, subsequently renamed "Państwowy Zakład Higieny" (National Institute of Hygiene) which exists in Warsaw to this day as Poland's main public health institute.

Rajchman was very active in the fight against several waves of a typhus epidemic which was devastating Eastern Europe and as such was noticed by the burgeoning League of Nations (LN), which named him in 1921 to set up a Health Organization for the LN in Geneva, Switzerland. The Health Organization is largely regarded as one of the LN's most successful undertakings. Rajchman travelled extensively to fulfill his mandate and notably became fascinated by the need for a quarantine and public health system in China: as such he became adviser to the Chinese government and became intimate with the Chang Kai-shek family and especially with T.V. Soong, the then Minister of Economy and brother of Madame Chang Kai-shek. In 1924, together with Arthur Sweetser, the League of Nations' Press Officer, and the Institut Jean-Jacques Rousseau educators Adolphe Ferrière and Paul Meyhoffer, he founded the International School of Geneva, the first of its kind in the world.

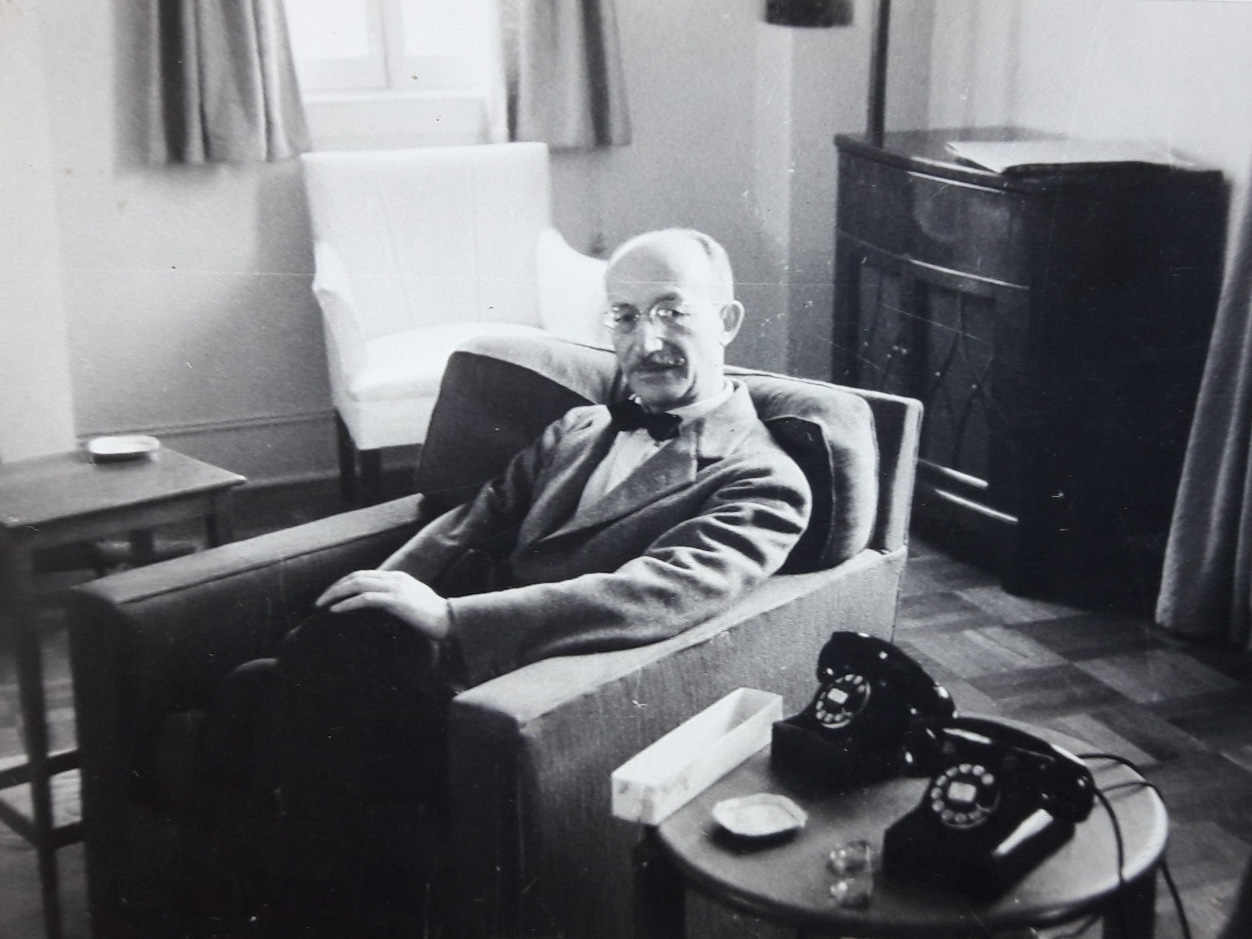
Rajchman in his apartment in Paris, c. 1940

In the early 1930s, Rajchman introduced his friend Jean Monnet to China's finance minister T. V. Soong, thus contributing to the creation in 1934 of the China Development Finance Corporation. Meanwhile, he became known in Geneva for his anti-fascist and anti-appeaser attitudes and actions. He no longer politically pleased the French appeaser director of the League of Nations, Joseph Avenol, who dismissed him from his functions in 1938.

Finding himself without a job, Rajchman went to China to help the government prepare their defense against Japan, notably by buying airplanes from the United States. His family moved to France, purchasing a "chateau" in Sarthe, in the west of France. The whole family was there when the Germans invaded France. Rajchman went to see the President of the Polish government in exile, General Sikorski whom he knew personally. Sikorski named him to be in charge of Polish refugees and gave him a letter to take to President Roosevelt asking for US help; he also issued Rajchman a diplomatic passport which was what allowed him to flee France through Spain and Portugal and eventually reach Washington DC. His family, including his wife Maria, their daughter Irena Balinska, grandson Michal, and Maria’s sister Lucja Liefeldt, obtained Portuguese visas from the Portuguese consul in Bordeaux Aristides de Sousa Mendes.

During the second world war, Rajchman worked on humanitarian issues, but also as adviser to TV Soong in development issues: indeed he was said to have belonged to the famous China Lobby. Towards the end of the war, UNRRA commissioned him to write a report on how to deal with the drastic state of health conditions once Europe would be freed, notably a typhus epidemic was feared. At the end of the war, the new communist Polish government in Lublin asked him to represent Poland within UNRRA. It is said that Rajchman had serious hesitations about collaborating with this government, but in the end he was won over by the desire to help his country which he did in fact very effectively through UNRRA.

== Later age, founding of UNICEF ==
When UNRRA announced at a UN meeting in Geneva that it would be putting an end to its relief efforts, Rajchman stood up before the assembly and called for the creation of a Fund dedicated to helping children throughout the world. His proposal was accepted and by the beginning of 1947, UNICEF was already helping children, notably with nutrition and immunization. Rajchman remained chairman of the board at UNICEF until 1950 and refused to be paid for his work.

In the context of the nascent Cold War and Stalinism in Soviet bloc countries, Rajchman was subpoenaed in the McCarthy period: he abruptly left for France and never returned to the United States. At the same time, the Polish communist authorities withdrew his Polish passport and he was not reissued one until 1956, when the post-Stalinist period began. From then on, Rajchman fairly often went to Poland, notably to visit his sister who had been dismissed by the authorities from her academic functions. His last visit was to Warsaw in 1963, to visit the public health institute he had founded in 1918.

== Personal life and death ==
Rajchman was married to Marja Bojanczyk and together the couple had a daughter Marthe Rajchman, who became a cartography specialist. He died in Chenu, Sarthe, in 1965 due to complications of Parkinson's disease.

== See also ==
- Michel Balinski, a grandson of Rajchman
- Janusz Korczak, children's rights advocate
- Marthe Rajchman, cartography specialist
- Timeline of young people's rights in the United Kingdom
- UNRRA
