= Anna Maria Antigó =

Catalan nun (1602–1676)

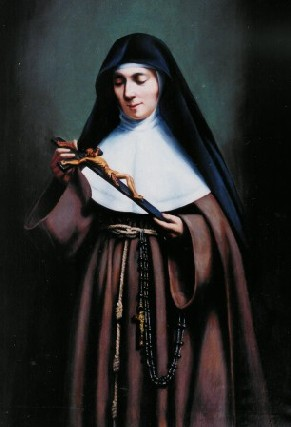
- Born: Anna Maria Antigó i Pujol; 19 January 1602; Parish of St. James, in Perpignan, Roussillon, Principality of Catalonia, Monarchy of Spain
- Died: 28 September 1676 (aged 74)
- Occupation: Catalan nun. Antigo
- Known for: Work for peace

Anna Maria Antigó i Pujol (19 January 1602 – 28 September 1676) was a Catalan nun. Antigo was abbess of the convent St. Clair-de-la-Passion, in Perpignan, dedicated to the Poor Clares. She is best known for her work for peace in this community, her reform of the Poor Clares' convent, and for her influence in Catalonia and beyond. She is interred at St. Claire Monastery, Perpignan. A beatification was initiated by the bishop of Perpignan, Jules de Carsalade du Pont, in 1909, but the process remained pending. Recognized as venerable, Antigo has a significant popular devotional following.

== Biography ==
Antigo was born in 1602, in the parish of St. James, in Perpinyà, Rosselló, Principality of Catalonia, Habsburg Spain. She was the daughter of the grocer Antigó Miquel Pujol and Marcellina. She entered the convent of Santa Clara of Poor Clares in 1621, where he was noted for her virtue and fervor towards penance. On 30 March 1645, she was elected as the abbess.

On 10 November 1652, Governor Pedro Rosselló, who was appointed by Louis XIV, banished the collaborationist Francesc de Segarra to Barcelona with twenty nuns, including Antigo, for "anti-French sentiments." They were installed at the convent of Santa Isabel during their exile which lasted more than eight years. Following the signing of the Treaty of the Pyrenees in 1659, Louis XIV pardoned them and stated they could come back the following year despite the negative influence of the governor, Segarra. On the occasion of a visit that Anne of Austria made on 10 April 1660 to the Santa Clara convent in Perpignan, Antigo asked for amnesty for exiled religious and she won Anne of Austria's favor. Thus, on May 25 of that year, Antigó and her companions were able to return to the convent in Perpignan. Another one of her notable accomplishments was within the religious community during the French occupation in trying to maintain the language and culture within the community, in addition to ensuring Catholic fervor and local customs. In 1664, Antigo was named the new abbess. Accompanied by sister Coronado and the support of fifteen sisters, they asked the Pope to remove the convent of Franciscan obedience and place it on the authority of the Roman Catholic Diocese of Perpignan-Elne. One of the arguments for was that confessors could not receive confession in Catalan. She reformed the religious community, strictly enforcing adherence to the rules of order, and she maintained a strict convent life until her death.

Antigo died on September 28, 1676, widely admired and revered, as evidenced by her grave, which became a place of pilgrimage locally. At least within the community, there was a willingness to pray to a woman who was already credited some miraculous actions. A cause for her beatification was opened on 27 July 1921, and she was formally declared a Servant of God.
