= Academy of Geneva =

Academy of Geneva may refer to:

- University of Geneva, founded by John Calvin in 1559
- Rousseau Institute, founded by Édouard Claparède in 1912
