= Geneva school (psychology) =

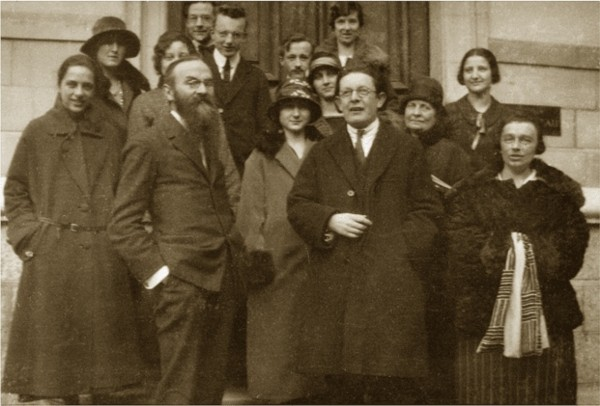
Rousseau Institute

The Geneva School (also called the Genevan School) is a school of psychology that emphasizes development through interaction with the environment.

== History ==
In 1918, Jean Piaget (1896–1980) turned away from his early training in natural history and began post-doctoral work in psychoanalysis in Zurich. Later Piaget rejected psychoanalysis, as he thought it was insufficiently empirical. In 1919, he moved to Paris to work at the Binet-Simon Lab. However, Alfred Binet had died in 1911 and Théodore Simon lived and worked in Rouen. His supervision therefore came (indirectly) from Pierre Janet, Binet's old rival and a professor at the Collège de France.

The job in Paris was relatively simple: to use the statistical techniques he had learned as a natural historian, studying molluscs, to standardize Cyril Burt's intelligence test for use with French children. Yet without direct supervision, he soon found a remedy to this boring work: exploring why children made the mistakes they did. Applying his early training in psychoanalytic interviewing, Piaget began to intervene directly with the children: "Why did you do that?" (etc.) It was from this that the ideas formalized in his later stage theory first emerged.

In 1921, Piaget moved to Geneva to work with Édouard Claparède at the Rousseau Institute. They formed what is now known as the "Geneva School." In 1936, Piaget received his first honorary doctorate from Harvard. In 1955, the International Center for Genetic Epistemology was founded: an interdisciplinary collaboration of theoreticians and scientists, devoted to the study of topics related to Piaget's theory. In 1969, Piaget received the "distinguished scientific contributions" award from the American Psychological Association.
