= Yves Brunsvick =

Yves Brunsvick (1921–1999) was a famous humanist and philosopher of education. Initially a French teacher, in 1948 he joined the French National Commission (a subsidiary of UNESCO), initially as assistant to the Secretary-General, Louis François. In 1958 he became head of the commission. Throughout his life, he had great connections in the cultural aspects of UNESCO and had many interest in the International Bureau of Education (IBE). Subsequently, he held the presidency of the IBE council from 1986 to 1989.

In 2001, he was posthumously awarded the Comenius Medal at the forty-sixth session of the International Conference on Education held in Geneva.

He wrote a multitude of books including Birth of a civilization: the shock of globalization (co-authored with André Danzin), Lexique de la vie culturelle, and Les Francais a Travers Leurs Romans (co-author Marc Blancpain), among others. He is listed as one of the 100 most famous educators by IBE.
