= Marie Butts =

French educator, translator and author

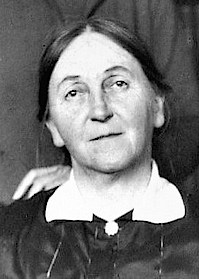
Marie Butts.

Marie Charlotte Elisabeth Butts (1870, Thonon – 1953, Geneva) was a French educator, translator, and children’s book author. She served as the first General Secretary of the International Bureau of Education (IBE) from 1926 to 1953, alongside directors Pierre Bovet and Jean Piaget, respectively.

== Career ==
Butts held several teaching positions from 1895 to 1939, lecturing in subjects such as English language, literature, and industrial psychology. In 1926, she became the first General Secretary of the International Bureau of Education (IBE), a position she retained for 28 years, until the age of 77. In 1947, she was a member of the committee of experts of UNESCO on international understanding. Butts was the author of several children’s books, including Roland le Vaillant Paladin published by Librarie Larousse in 1911. She also translated a number of works by English language writers into French, including H.G. Wells, Dhan Gopal Mukerji, and Anatole Le Braz.
