= Beauvallon school =

Coordinates: 44°31′26″N 5°05′34″E

The Beauvallon school was founded in 1929 in Dieulefit, Drôme, by Marguerite Soubeyran and Catherine Krafft, the 2 lifeguards joined by Simone Monnier in 1936.

== History ==
From 1927 onwards, Marguerite Soubeyran studied nursing in Geneva and opened her own boarding house in Dieulefit. Her aim was to create a children's home that would help develop those in difficulty according to the methods of the new education, and it was this knowledge that she wished to acquire at the Institut Jean-Jacques Rousseau. There she met Catherine Krafft, director of the student house, and together they decided to found the École de Beauvallon.

Jean Piaget and Édouard Claparède gave them advice. The directors, Marguerite Soubeyran and Catherine Krafft, joined by Simone Monnier in 1936, all had Protestant backgrounds. In France, the École des Roches, inspired by active methods and founded by Edmond Demolins (1852-1907) in Verneuil-sur-Avre, had existed since 1899, but the École de Beauvallon, founded in 1929, was the first new co-educational school in France.

At the end of the 1930s, Spanish refugees and then, during the Second World War, Jewish children and adults, resistance fighters and German communists found refuge here. The establishment was discreetly assisted by the town clerk, Jeanne Barnier, who circulated false identity papers when necessary. The gendarmerie and the sub-prefect of Nyons also provided assistance. The place enjoys the silence of the people of Dieulefit. A number of prominent figures, including Pierre Emmanuel, Emmanuel Mounier, Pierre Seghers, Louis Aragon and Yvonne Lefébure, took refuge and taught there. After the Izieu roundup on August 6, 1944, Jewish teenagers taking refuge in the school slept in nearby caves at night, as a precaution. Before returning to school in the early hours of the morning, they had to make sure that a red blanket was not laid out on the terrace as a sign of danger.

After the war, in the second half of the 20th century and into the 21st century, the school continued to play an educational role. Coline Serreau, for example, spent her early childhood there. École de Beauvallon is home to around 70 children in ITEP and SESSAD structures.
