= Rosselló =

Catalan surname

Rosselló (Catalan pronunciation: [rose'ʎɔ]) is a surname of Catalan origin. It can refer to:

== Places ==
- Rosselló (comarca), a historical Catalan comarca of Northern Catalonia, now part of France
- Rosselló, Lleida, a municipality located in the province of Lleida, Catalonia, Spain
- County of Roussillon (Catalan: Rosselló), historical county of the Principality of Catalonia
  - Counts of Roussillon, a list of counts associated with the county
- Roussillon, the Catalan territories annexed by France after the Peace of the Pyrenees

== People with the surname ==
- Grego Rossello (born 1991), Argentine entertainer
- María Eugenia Roselló (born 1981), Uruguayan politician
- Pedro Rosselló (born 1944), former Governor and former Senator of Puerto Rico
- Pedro Rosselló (educator) (born 1897), Catalan lecturer and educator
- Ricardo Rosselló (born 1979), former Governor of Puerto Rico
- Roy Rosselló (born 1971), former member of Menudo

== See also ==
- Rosello (disambiguation)
