= Rosello (disambiguation) =

Rosello is a village in the Abruzzo region of Italy.

Rosello or Rossello may also refer to:

== Places ==
- Fountain of the Rosello, a fountain of Sassari and Sardinia in Italy

== People with the surname ==
- Dave Rosello (born 1950), Puerto Rican former Major League Baseball player
- Rossello di Jacopo Franchi (c. 1377 – c. 1456), Italian painter and illuminator

== See also ==
- Rosselló
