= Roger Cousinet =

French teacher (1881–1973)

Roger Cousinet

Roger Cousinet (1881 in Arcueil, France – 5 April 1973 in Paris, France) was a French teacher and a pioneer of the progressive education system in France. He obtained his Bachelor of Arts in 1903 at École Normale Supérieure. He went on to become a teacher, before being mobilized into World War 1. Soon after the war, he continued his teaching, focusing on the method of active learning, which was initially frowned upon by his superiors at the time.

In 1922 he founded the journal La nouvelle Education, running it until 1939. In 1946 he created with François Chatelain the new School of the Source in Meudon, and the New School Association Française. In 1964, he founded the journal Education and Development which is still a current prominent French journal.

He has published a number of books including: A method of free labor groups (1945), The social life of the child (1950), The new education (1950) and Do as I say (1950). He is listed as one of the 100 most famous educators by the International Bureau of Education (IBE).
