= International School of Geneva =

Coordinates: 46°11′55″N 6°10′21″E

International School of Geneva; École internationale de Genève
- Geneva; Grand Saconnex; Founex; Pregny-Chambésy; Switzerland

Information
- Type: Day School
- Established: 1924
- Enrollment: 4,500
- Colors: Navy Blue and White
- Website: ecolint.ch

The International School of Geneva (French: École internationale de Genève), commonly known as Ecolint, is a private, non-profit international school based in Geneva, Switzerland.

== Background ==
Founded in 1924 in the service of the League of Nations and the International Labour Organization, it is the oldest international school. It was the result of a partnership between parents (Arthur Sweetser and Ludwik Rajchman) and educators from the Institut Jean-Jacques Rousseau (Adolphe Ferrière and Paul Meyhoffer).

In the mid-1960s, a group of teachers from Ecolint (La Grande Boissière campus) created the International Schools Examinations Syndicate (ISES), which later became the International Baccalaureate Organization (IBO) and then the International Baccalaureate (IB).

Since its inception, the school's mission has been conceived as educating for peace and the inculcation of humanitarian values such as inclusiveness, respect and inter-cultural understanding. It describes itself in its website as "resolutely not-for-profit; mankind is the only beneficiary of our work, not corporate shareholders or private equity firms". In 2017, it was labelled by ITN as "the most diverse school on the planet". Article 4 of Ecolint's Charter states that "the activity of the school in all fields and especially in the field of pedagogy shall be based on the principles of equality and solidarity among all peoples and of the equal value of all human beings without any distinction of nationality, race, sex, language or religion".

Ecolint comprises three campuses in and around Geneva, each with its own principal (also known as "director") working under the director general of the Foundation of the International School of Geneva and a Governing Board elected by parents, staff and alumni with members from the UN and Swiss government. Ecolint is a bilingual school, with instruction primarily in English and French. In addition to the IB, it is a testing centre for the US college boards (SAT and ACT) and the British IGCSE (CIE). Ecolint is a member of the G30 Schools Group.

== History ==
The history of Ecolint has been charted in four volumes published in different decades. The first, bilingual one (Ecole Internationale de Genève – Son premier demi-siècle / International School of Geneva – the first 50 years, Geneva: 1974, 311 pages), edited by René Lejeune (better known as René-François Lejeune), compiles the contributions and eyewitness accounts of various authors, including the historian Robert J. Leach and Ecolint's second director, Marie-Thérèse Maurette. The second one (Ecolint – A portrait of the International School of Geneva, 1924–1999, Geneva: 1999, 218 pages) was written by the historian Michael Knight. The third volume (Marie-Thérèse Maurette – Pioneer of International Education, Geneva: 2009, 84 pages), which focuses specifically on the director who headed the school between 1929 and 1949, was authored by Professor George Walker, former director general of Ecolint and of the International Baccalaureate Organization. The fourth and final volume to date (Ecolint – A History of the International School of Geneva, Geneva: 2014, 170 pages) is the joint work of educators Conan de Wilde (an alumnus of the school) and Othman Hamayed (a former director of La Grande Boissière's Secondary School). In addition, Robert J. Leach published privately in 1974 his own account of the school’s history, International School of Geneva, 1924–1974 (63 pages). Most recently, the geographer and economist Phil Thomas, who served as interim Director General and held a wide range of teaching positions in the school during his 35-year Ecolint career, published the booklet Ecolint and the Origins of the International Baccalaureate in 2018.

From 1920 to 1921 the League of Nations and the International Labour Office established their headquarters in Geneva. In 1924 the International School of Geneva was founded by senior members of these two international organizations, most notably Arthur Sweetser and Ludwik Rajchman, in partnership with Adolphe Ferrière and Paul Meyhoffer, educators from Geneva's Institut Jean-Jacques Rousseau. Meyhoffer, originally trained as a theologian, had previously taught at Bedales School in England and, for eight years, at the Ecole Nouvelle de la Châtaigneraie (also known as Ecole Nouvelle du Léman), which in 1974 was integrated into Ecolint.

Ferrière housed the first class in a chalet that was part of his family's estate, on the Route de Florissant in Geneva. He was also technical adviser to the school from 1924 to 1926. The nascent school was supported by William Rappard, rector of the University of Geneva; the neurologist and child psychologist Édouard Claparède; and Sir Arthur Salter, a senior official of the League of Nations. After occupying rented accommodation on the Rue Charles Bonnet in Geneva's Vieille ville (Old Town), the school finally acquired its own premises in 1929: a historic site known as La Grande Boissière. The acquisition of this large property was made financially possible by Arthur Sweetser, who personally gave the school thousands of dollars and sought contributions from his network of affluent acquaintances. These donations included 25,000 U.S. dollars from John D. Rockefeller Jr.

Among Ecolint’s notable teachers during the early decades of its existence were Paul Dupuy, formerly doyen (dean) at Paris’ Ecole normale supérieure and defender of Alfred Dreyfus in the late 1890s; the psychoanalyst Charles Baudouin; the philosopher Jeanne Hersch; and the novelist Michel Butor.

The school became a foundation in 1968, and continued to evolve as it acquired new campuses. In 1974 it incorporated as its second campus La Châtaigneraie (also called "La Chât"), which had originally been founded in 1908 as the Ecole Nouvelle La Châtaigneraie (later known as Collège Protestant Romand) near Founex in the Canton of Vaud. La Châtaigneraie itself had become the home of the secondary school section of the Lycée des Nations in 1973. It had been established in 1964 as a small international school on the Rive Droite, in the village of Bellevue, Switzerland.

== Campuses ==
- La Grande Boissière (also called "LGB") is the largest of the three campuses and has been a part of Ecolint since 1929. The primary school (beginning from age three) has approximately 550 students, and runs through grade 4. The middle school also has about 550 students, and runs from grade 5 to grade 8. The secondary school has around 800 students, beginning with 9th grade and going to grade 12 or 13. All three stages offer bilingual programmes.
- La Châtaigneraie (also called "La Chât") became part of Ecolint in 1973 and is located in the Vaud countryside, near Founex, overlooking the Alps and Lake Léman. It has a primary and a secondary school, and has approximately 1600 students. Despite joining Ecolint after LGB, the oldest building on campus is the main secondary building which was completed in 1908, when La Châtaigneraie first opened, making it the oldest campus and longest-running educational establishment among the three.
- Campus des Nations (also simply called "Nations") opened in 2005 and operates on two locations in and in the vicinity of Grand Saconnex. It has around 1000 students. Campus des Nations is the only campus to offer all four IB programmes (PYP, MYP, IBDP and IBCP).
- Saconnex is located near the International Labour Organization and World Health Organization headquarters. Saconnex offers classes to 800 students from years 3 through 13. All classes taught at Nations follow the IB curriculum, consisting of PYP, MYP and DP or CP.
- Pregny (in Pregny-Chambésy) is located near the United Nations and Red Cross HQ and is a school of 200 students from pre-school and kindergarten to year 2.

== Accreditation ==
=== Swiss ===
International School of Geneva's (upper) secondary education (middle and high school) is not listed as a Collège by the State Secretariat for Education, Research and Innovation (SERI). Nonetheless, education leading to the Maturité Fédérale (Federal Matura) is offered at the La Châtaigneraie campus, including the option to undertake the bilingual (English/French) Maturité.

=== International ===
Ecolint's various programmes are accredited by the Council of International Schools (CIS) and the Middle States Association (MSA).

Ecolint has satisfied the authorization procedures of the International Baccalaureate (IB) to offer the PYP, MYP, IBDP, and IBCP.

== Governance ==
The Governing Board appoints the director general to which the latter is accountable. All alumni, current parents, teachers and other employees may vote in the Governing Board elections and may be elected as members. Three seats are permanently reserved for members appointed by the Cantons of Geneva and Vaud, and by the United Nations. The school’s personnel are represented on the Board by three appointed or elected observers (one from each campus), and the Staff Association has the right to nominate for full membership someone who is not a current employee of the school. Parents typically constitute a majority on the Governing Board. Kofi Annan was a member of the Board from 1981 to 1983. Ecolint’s governance was inspired by the direct democratic mechanisms of Switzerland. The Governing Board is accountable to all community members (parents, personnel and alumni) at the annual Consultative General Assembly and, when convened by members of the Ecolint community, at Extraordinary Consultative General Assemblies. In February 2002, one of these assemblies, held at the United Nations, was attended by some 1,000 people. It gave rise to a no-confidence referendum in June of that year involving all the school's eligible voters, the outcome of which forced the resignation of both the Governing Board’s Executive Committee and of the director general.

== Notable staff ==
- Dr Nicholas Tate, Director General, 2003–2011

== Notable alumni ==
The Charter of the International School of Geneva gives all registered alumni the right to vote in the elections for the school's Governing Board, and to be elected as Governing Board members.

=== Politics ===
- Richard Corbett – British politician
- Álvaro de Soto – Peruvian diplomat
- Indira Gandhi – Prime Minister of India
- Michel Halpérin – Swiss lawyer and politician
- Bob Rae – Canadian diplomat and former Premier of Ontario
- Elizabeth Young, Baroness Kennet – British peace and anti-nuclear campaigner and intellectual

=== Science and medicine ===
- Gail Carpenter – American cognitive scientist, neuroscientist and mathematician
- Dorland J. Davis – American physician and immunologist
- Harold Furth – Austrian-American physicist
- Daniel A. Haber – French oncologist and academic
- Douglas Hofstadter – American cognitive and computer scientist
- Mieko Kamiya – Japanese psychiatrist, philosopher and translator
- Alan Kostelecky – American theoretical physicist
- Stephen Lee – American chemist and professor
- David Shaffer – South African-born British-American psychiatrist and paediatrician
- Carina Tyrrell – British-Swiss public health physician, philanthropist and beauty pageant titleholder

=== Visual and performing arts ===
- Milein Cosman – German-born British artist
- Joe Dassin – American–French singer-songwriter and actor
- Maya Deren – Ukrainian-born American director, film-maker and actress
- Claude Jaeger – Swiss-born French film producer and actor
- Christophe Lambert – French actor
- Lori Lieberman – American singer and songwriter
- Lisa Simone – American singer, composer and actress
- Maya Stojan – Swiss actress
- Edouard van Remoortel – Belgian symphony orchestra conductor

=== Literature ===
- Alex Buzo – Australian playwright
- Elizabeth Frank – American novelist, biographer, art critic and translator
- Lucia Graves – English writer and translator
- Nicole Krauss – American author
- Sonny Mehta – Indian-British-American editor and publisher

=== Law ===
- Ronald M. George – American jurist

=== Journalism ===
- Rami George Khouri – Jordanian-American journalist and editor

=== Economics ===
- Hernando de Soto – Peruvian economist
- Edward A. Tenenbaum – American economist
- Erik Thorbecke – Dutch-American economist

=== Academia and scholarship ===
- Shadi Bartsch – American academic
- Isabel de Madariaga – British historian

=== Others ===
- Yasmin Aga Khan – American philanthropist
- Edmond Adolphe de Rothschild – French-Swiss banker
- Tatiana Santo Domingo – American-born Colombian-Monégasque socialite, heiress and fashion designer
- Norman Schwarzkopf Jr. – American United States Army general
- Galyani Vadhana – Princess of Thailand
- James Vowles – British motorsport engineer
- Anne-Marie Walters – British secret agent in Nazi-occupied France during World War II

== Gallery ==
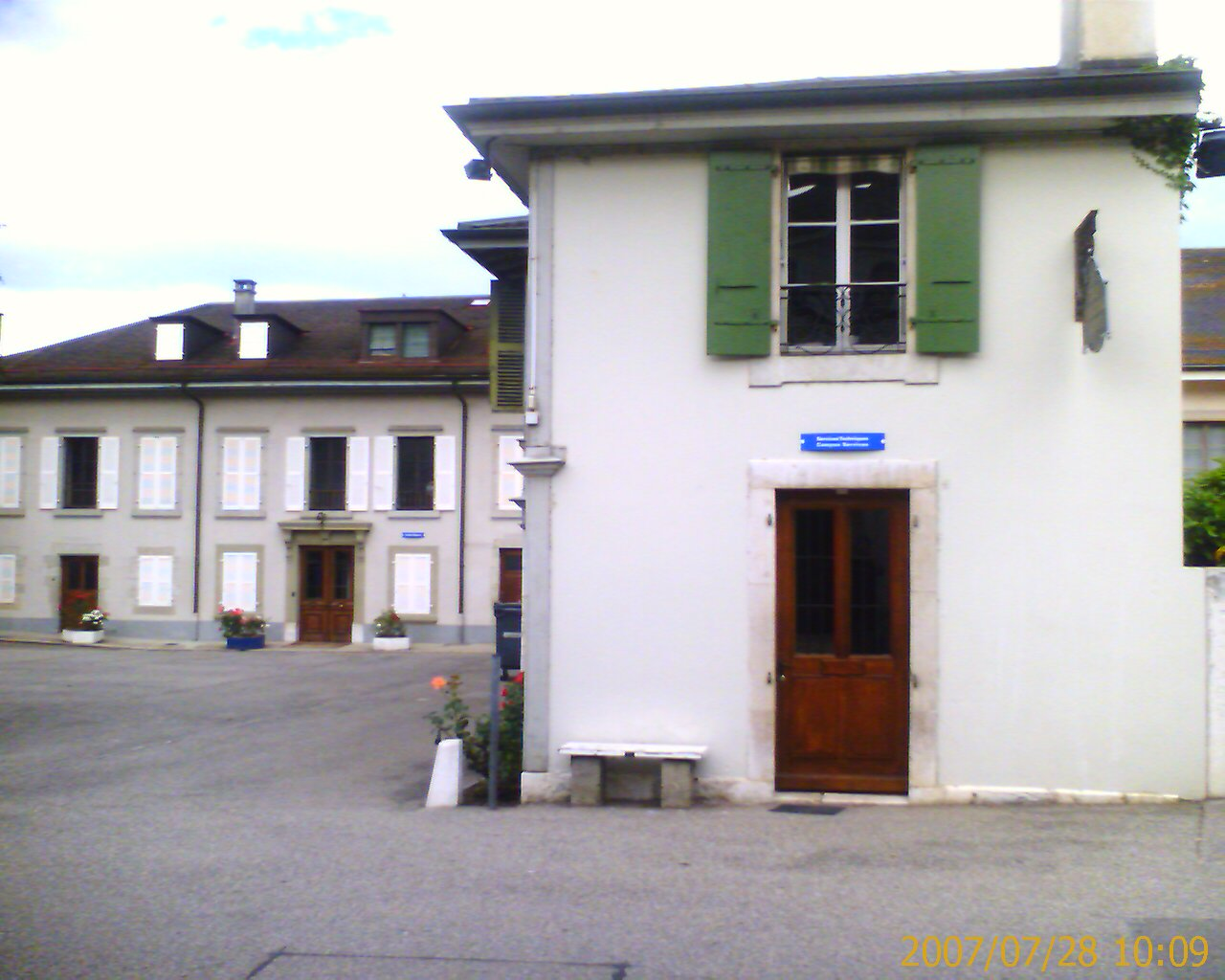
La Loge and Vieille Maison at "LGB" Campus

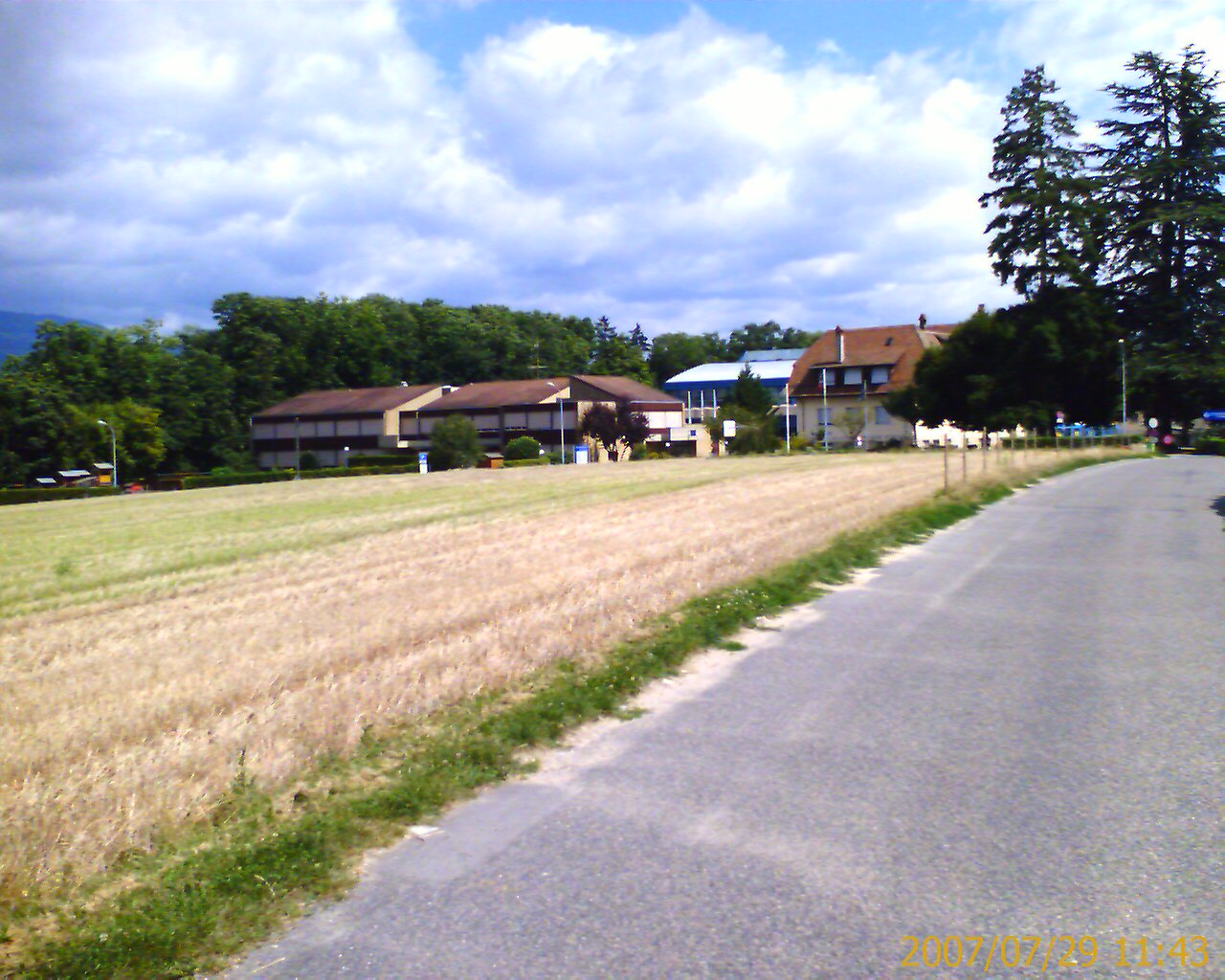
La Châtaigneraie Campus

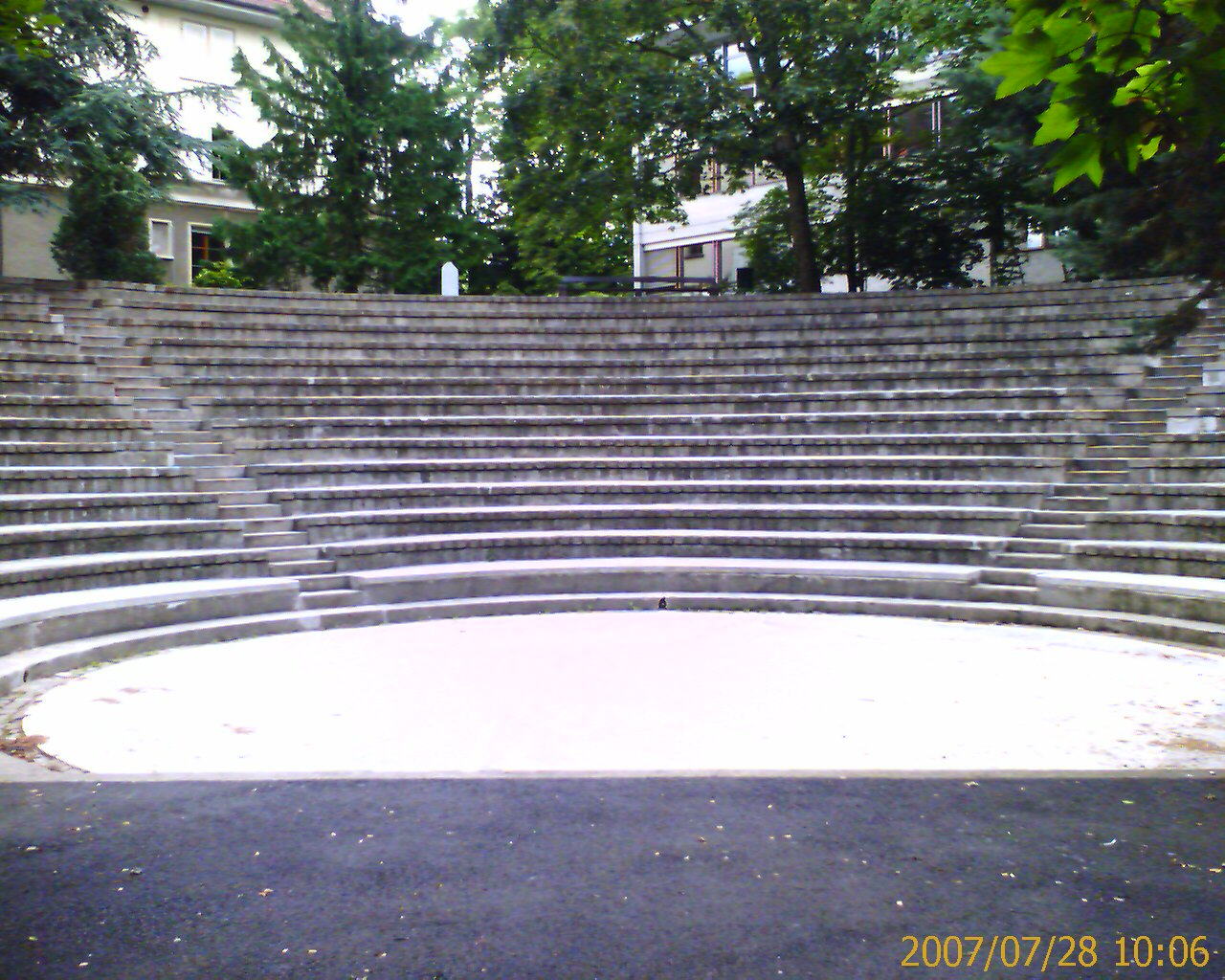
The Greek Theatre at La Grande Boissière Campus

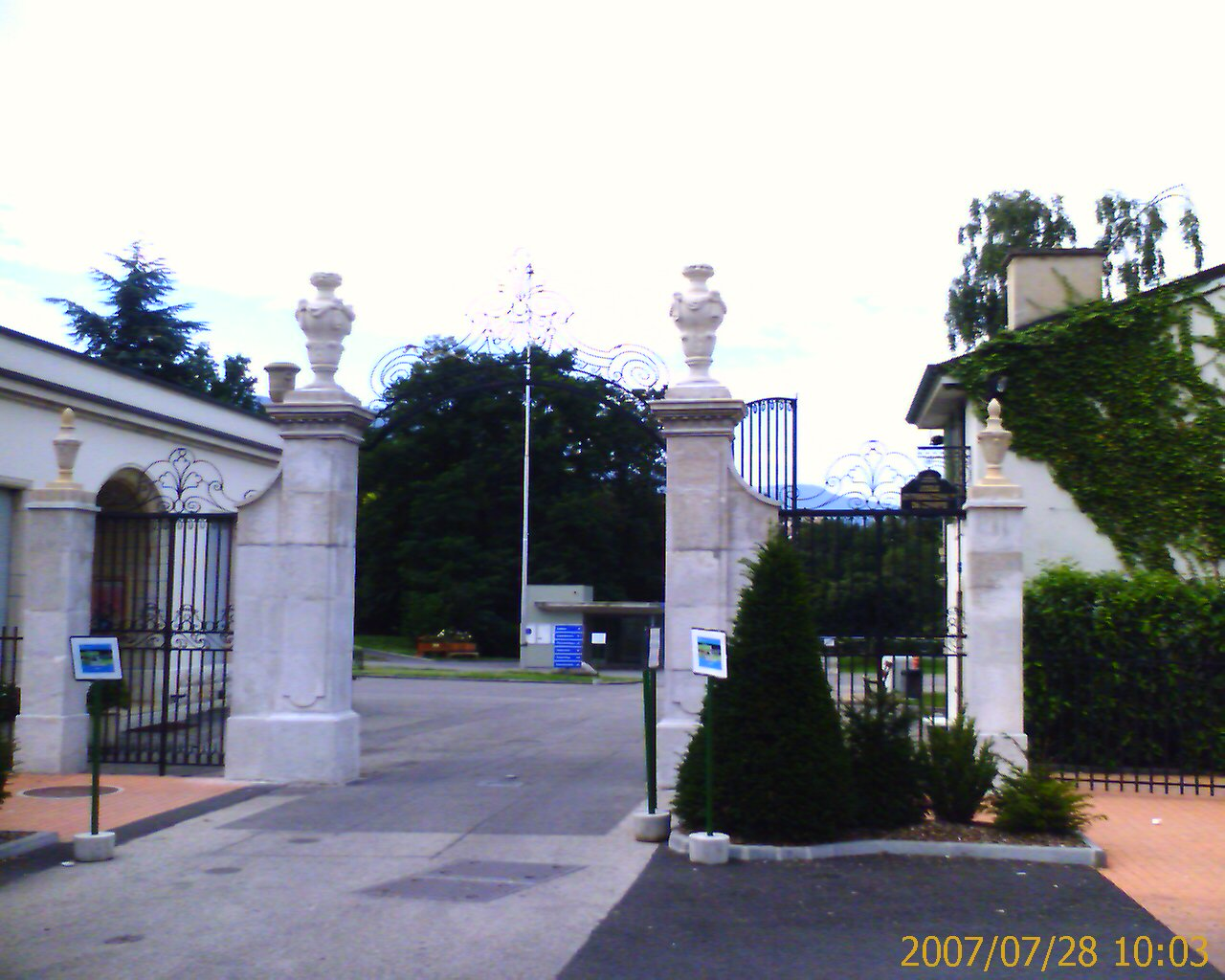
Main entrance at La Grande Boissière Campus

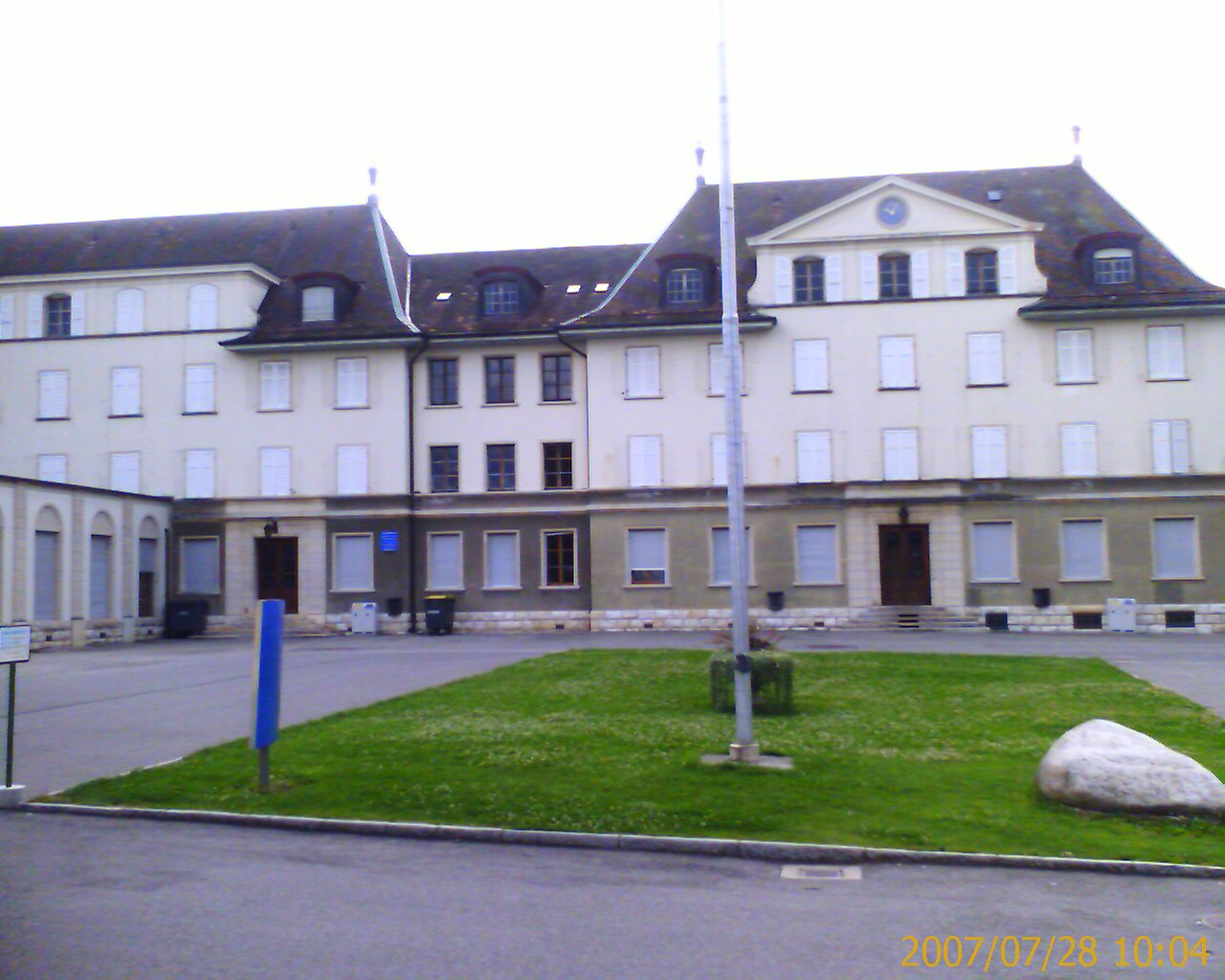
Grand Bâtiment at La Grande Boissière Campus

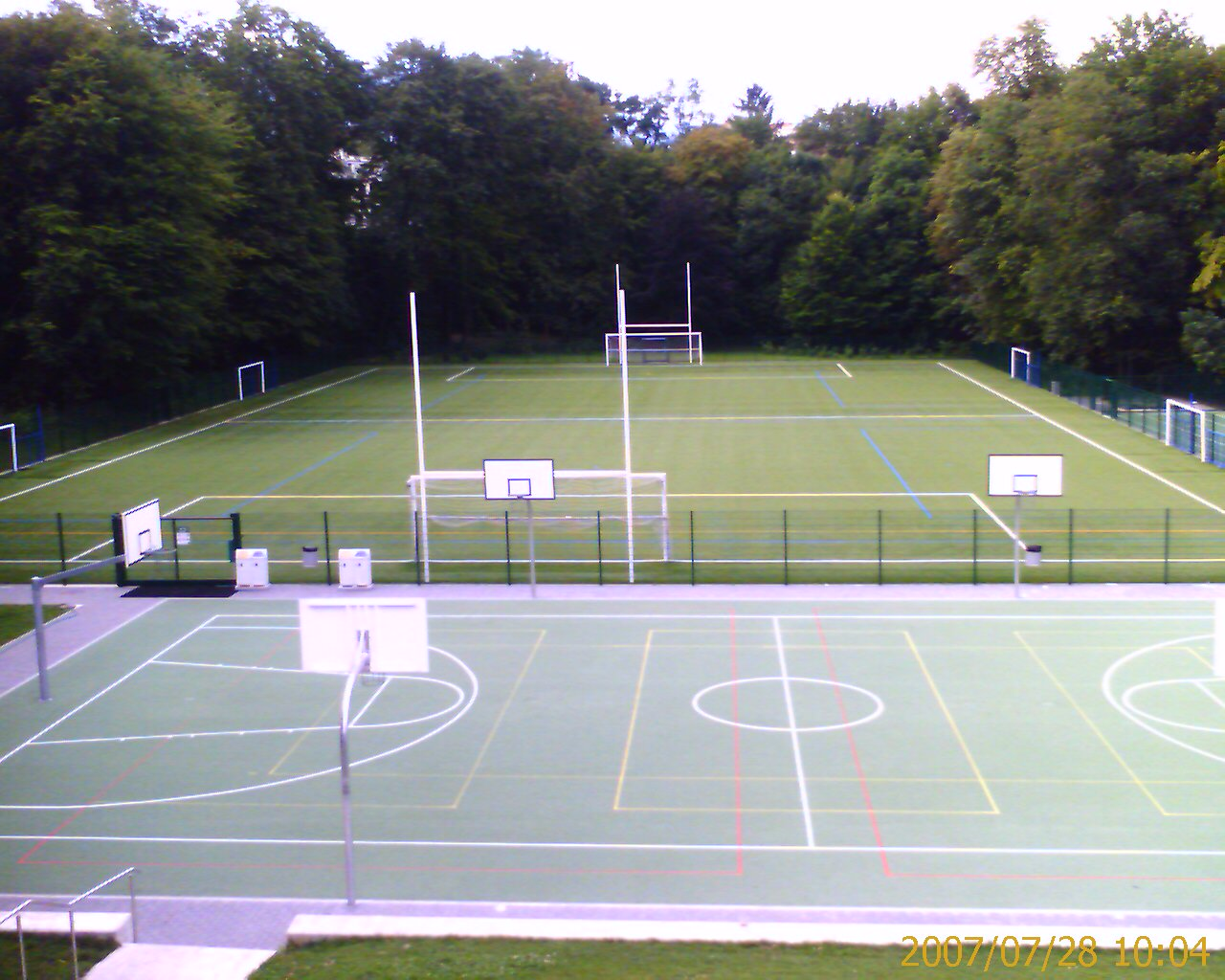
Playing Fields at La Grande Boissière Campus

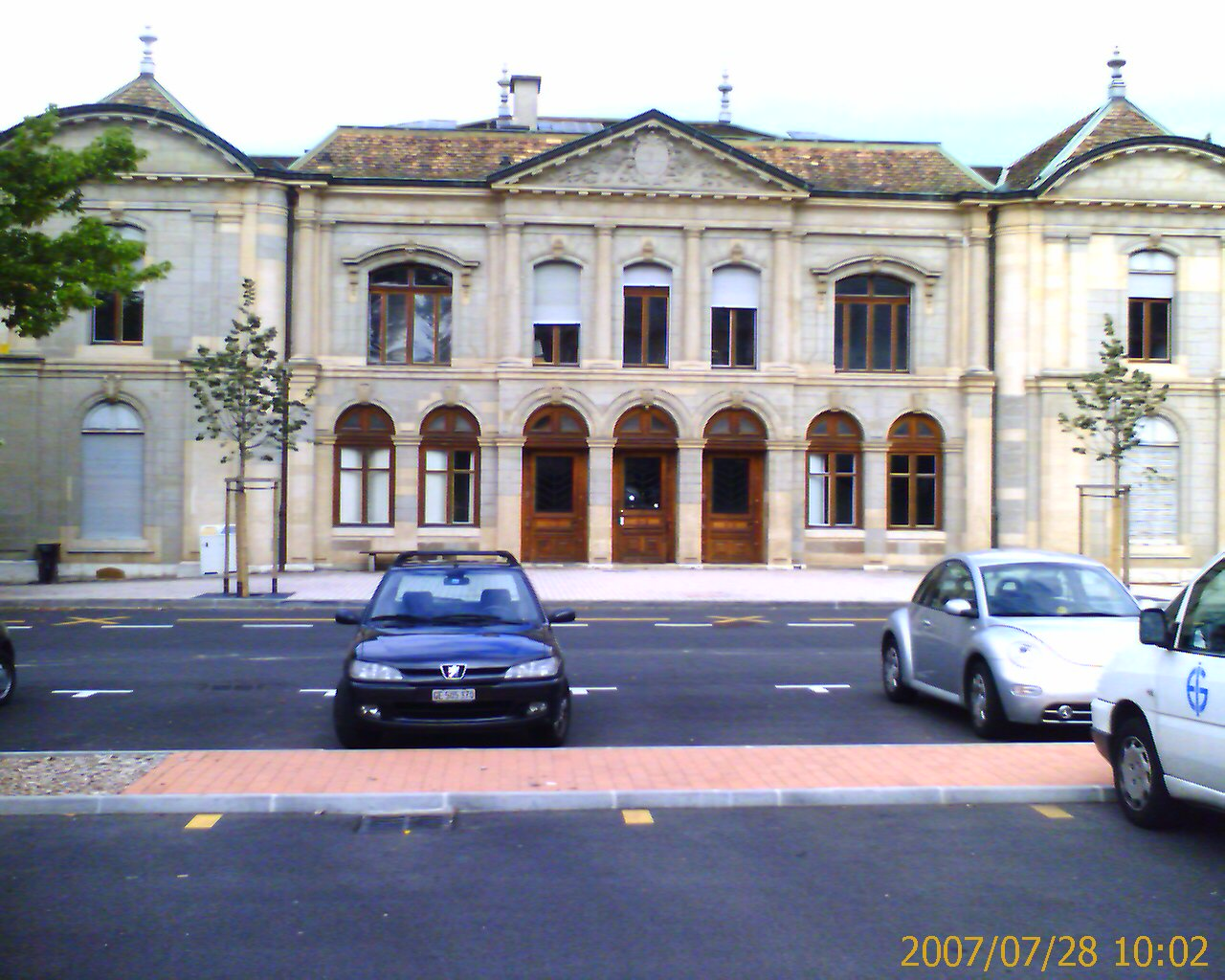
Le Château at La Grande Boissière Campus

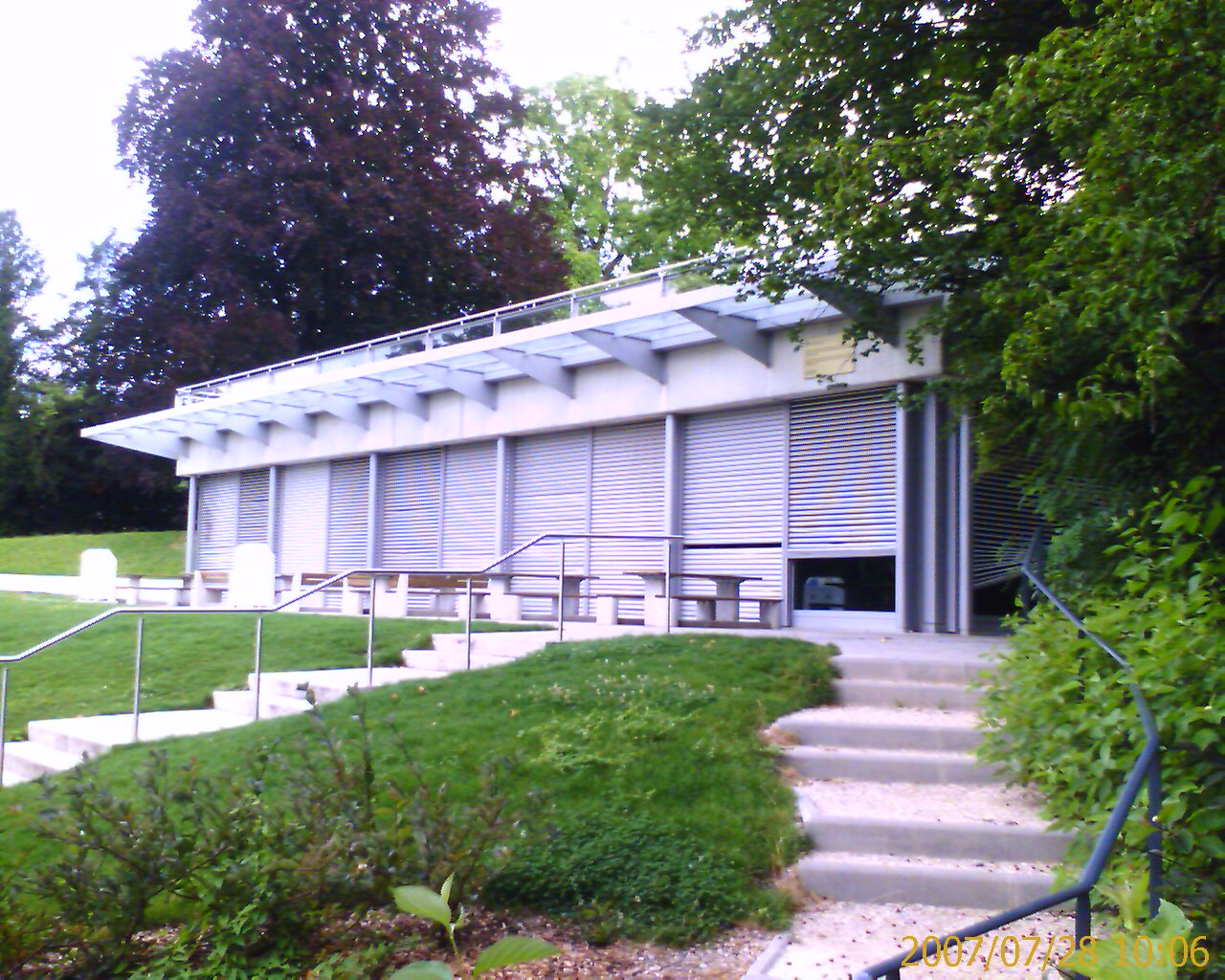
Cafeteria at La Grande Boissière Campus
