= Elisabeth Rotten =

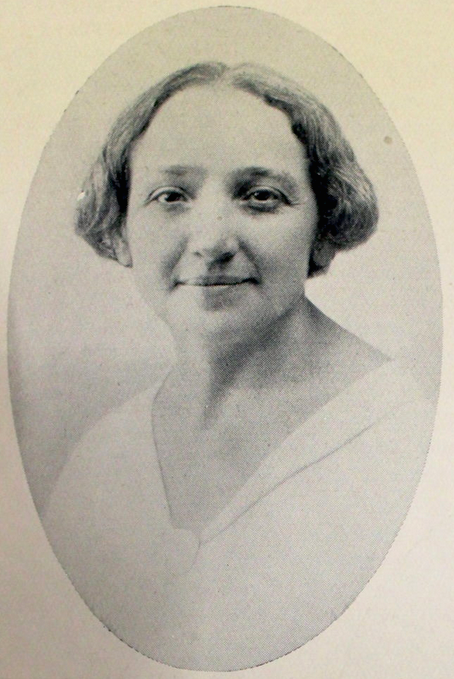

Elisabeth Friederike Rotten (15 February 1882, Berlin - 2 May 1964) was a Quaker peace activist and educational progressive.

== Life ==
As daughter to the Swiss couple Moritz and Luise Rotten, she attended the "höhere Mädchenschule Luisenschule" during 1888-1898, later studying at the Victoria-Lyzeum Berlin from 1904. In September 1906 she took the Reifeprüfung at the Kaiserin Augusta-Gymnasium Charlottenburg. She graduated in her studies in philosophy and German language and literature in Heidelberg, Berlin, Marburg and Montpellier. In Marburg she met with Hermann Lietz and Gustav Wyneken, which was vital to the future development of her thinking. In 1913 she published her PhD thesis under the title "Goethes Urphänomen und die platonische Idee" (Goethe's "Urphänomen" and the Platonic ideal) in Marburg.

In 1913 she began lecturing at the University of Cambridge on German literature. In 1914 she returned to Berlin and worked in the "Auskunfts- und Hilfsstelle für Deutsche im Ausland und Ausländer in Deutschland" with professor Friedrich Siegmund-Schultze. In the same year she co-founded the "Bund Neues Vaterland", later the "German League for Human Rights". In 1915 she travelled as a representative to the 1st International Women's Congress in The Hague and worked for the foundation of the "Internationalen Frauenliga für Frieden und Freiheit" (International Women's League for Peace and Freedom").

In 1922, together with Beatrice Ensor and Adolphe Ferrière she founded the New Education Fellowship, becoming its vice-chair for German-speaking countries and editor of its German-language journal, which eventually came to be called Das Werdende Zeitalter. From 1922 she was associated with the school farm, Schulfarm Insel Scharfenberg, begun by Wilhelm Blume in Berlin and was a frequent visitor to the Odenwaldschule founded in 1910 by the educational reformer Paul Geheeb.

In 1925, Rotten and Adolphe Ferrière became the first deputy directors of the International Bureau of Education (IBE), where they provided support to director Pierre Bovet.

She was also a friend of the anarchist, Gustav Landauer, who was Minister of Culture in the short-lived Munich Soviet (or “Council Republic”) of 1919 before being murdered after it was violently suppressed. From 1926 until 1932, Rotten shared the editorship of the journal Das Werdende Zeitalter with Karl Wilker, an exponent of social pedagogy who transformed the Lindenhof in Berlin. The title of this journal was inspired by that given to a collection of essays by Landauer, which his friend, the philosopher Martin Buber, published in 1921. In 1930, Rotten co-founded a school at Hellerau just outside Dresden, where a garden city was established shortly after 1900 as part of a reform movement advocating modern housing.

== See also ==
- List of peace activists

== Bibliography ==
- Dietmar Haubfleisch: Schulfarm Insel Scharfenberg. Mikroanalyse der reformpädagogischen Unterrichts- und Erziehungsrealität einer demokratischen Versuchsschule im Berlin der Weimarer Republik (=Studien zur Bildungsreform, 40). Frankfurt u.a. 2001. ISBN 3-631-34724-3
  Inhaltsverzeichnis und Vorwort des Herausgebers der Reihe "Studien zur Bildungsreform"
- Dietmar Haubfleisch: Elisabeth Rotten (1882 - 1964) - eine (fast) vergessene Reformpädagogin. In Inge Hansen-Schaberg (ed.): „etwas erzählen“. Die lebensgeschichtliche Dimension in der Pädagogik. Bruno Schonig zum 60. Geburtstag. Baltmannsweiler 1997, S. 114-131. - Überarb. Ausg. unter Weglassung der Abb.: Marburg 1997:
  http://archiv.ub.uni-marburg.de/sonst/1996/0010.html
- Dietmar Haubfleisch: Elisabeth Rotten (1882 - 1964) - ein Quellen- und Literaturverzeichnis. Marburg 1997.
  http://archiv.ub.uni-marburg.de/sonst/1997/0010.html
- Das Werdende Zeitalter (Internationale Erziehungs-Rundschau). Register sämtlicher Aufsätze und Rezensionen einer reformpädagogischen Zeitschrift in der Weimarer Republik. Zusammengestellt und eingeleitet von Dietmar Haubfleisch und Jörg-W. Link (=Archivhilfe, 8), Oer-Erkenschwick 1994; Auszug der Einleitung (S. 5-16) wieder in: Mitteilungen & Materialien. Arbeitsgruppe Pädagogisches Museum e.V., Berlin, Heft Nr. 42/1994, S. 97-99; Einleitung in leicht korr. Fassung u.d.T.: 'Dietmar Haubfleisch und Jörg-W. Link: Einleitung zum Register der reformpädagogischen Zeitschrift 'Das Werdende Zeitalter' ('Internationale Erziehungs-Rundschau')' wieder: Marburg 1996:
  http://archiv.ub.uni-marburg.de/sonst/1996/0012.html
