= International Schools Services =

Founded in 1955, International Schools Services (ISS) was created as a nonprofit organization dedicated to assisting the international and American schools that were proliferating at that time. These schools were developing as a result of the increasing cooperation amongst world nations during this period of pronounced globalization.

== Background ==
The company was the brainchild of Arthur Sweetser a prolific author, educator, and statesman, who was present in Paris in 1916 at the birth of the League of Nations. His wartime travels as a reporter and ensuing involvement with government officials led him to his activism in promoting global communication through education. In 1924, he joined forces with others of like minds to develop the International School of Geneva and in 1947 the United Nations International School in New York. Sweetser hoped to pave the way for global understanding and communication, and, through these efforts, to open the door to world peace. His lofty goals took root in a practical not-for-profit company that would serve the needs of these international educational facilities.

== Support of international education programs ==
In the years following, as companies began to expand internationally and governments established a greater number of embassies and outposts, there developed an even greater need for schools in which the programs were multi-lingual, non-political, and approved by the local governments. In response to these needs, International Schools Services was founded.

By 1955, a great many of these schools had come into being around the world, some of them in remote areas and educating only a handful of students. These schools still had a need for guidance, for consistency, and for access to qualified teachers and materials, even though only serving such small numbers. Since multinational companies were often not in a position to provide these services, ISS was able to provide educational management services to these organizations, offering the structure and systems by which the schools could run independently. The company's services also were extended to the actual planning and development of international schools for both government and private concerns.

== Current work ==
As a not-for-profit agency, ISS continues to facilitate educational opportunities for children across the globe. Various branches of the company offer related services for the support and development of the academic programs, financial well-being, and physical plant for its client schools. This support includes staff recruitment, financial management, school supply procurement, professional development, and information services. In addition, ISS offers a Foundations Management program that enables International Schools to maintain a non-profit status within the United States and helps them with issues related to accounting, taxes, board management, grant application and writing and fund raising.

At the present time, ISS directly manages 20+ schools and provides specific services to more than 800 international schools. In addition to a base office in Princeton, New Jersey, ISS currently has three regional offices, located in the Middle East, the Asia Pacific, and the Caribbean.
