= Adolphe Ferrière =

Swiss educationalist

Adolphe Emmanuel Ferrière
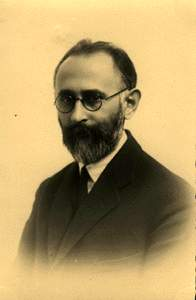
- Born: 30 August 1879; Geneva, Switzerland
- Died: 16 June 1960 (aged 80); Geneva, Switzerland
- Education: University of Geneva
- Occupations: Educator, Author
- Known for: pedagogy

Adolphe Ferrière (1879 in Geneva – 1960 in Geneva) was one of the founders of the progressive education movement.

== Life ==
Ferrière worked for a brief time in a school in Glarisegg (TG, CH) and later founded an experimental school ('La Forge') in Lausanne, Switzerland, but soon had to abandon teaching due to his deafness. In 1921, he founded the New Education Fellowship, for which he wrote the charter. Until the Second World War, the congress of this league included a number of other teachers which were Maria Montessori, Célestin Freinet, Gisèle de Failly and Roger Cousinet. He worked as a humanist and an editor from 1919 to 1922 on the pacifist journal 'l'Essor' (The Rise).

In 1924, alongside his colleague Paul Meyhoffer from the Institut Jean-Jacques Rousseau, and the League of Nations officials Arthur Sweetser and Ludwik Rajchman, Ferrière founded the International School of Geneva (the first of its kind in the world) and, during the early months of its existence, provided the new school with accommodation in a chalet he owned. He was one of the founding members of the International Bureau of Education (IBE) in 1925, and served as its first deputy director alongside Elisabeth Rotten. He was also a member of the Religious Society of Friends (Quakers). Throughout his life he published a substantial number of books, some in collaboration with Karl-Ernst Krafft.

== See also ==
- Pedagogy
