= Arthur Sweetser =

American journalist (1888–1968)

Arthur Sweetser (1888–1968) was a US journalist and statesman.

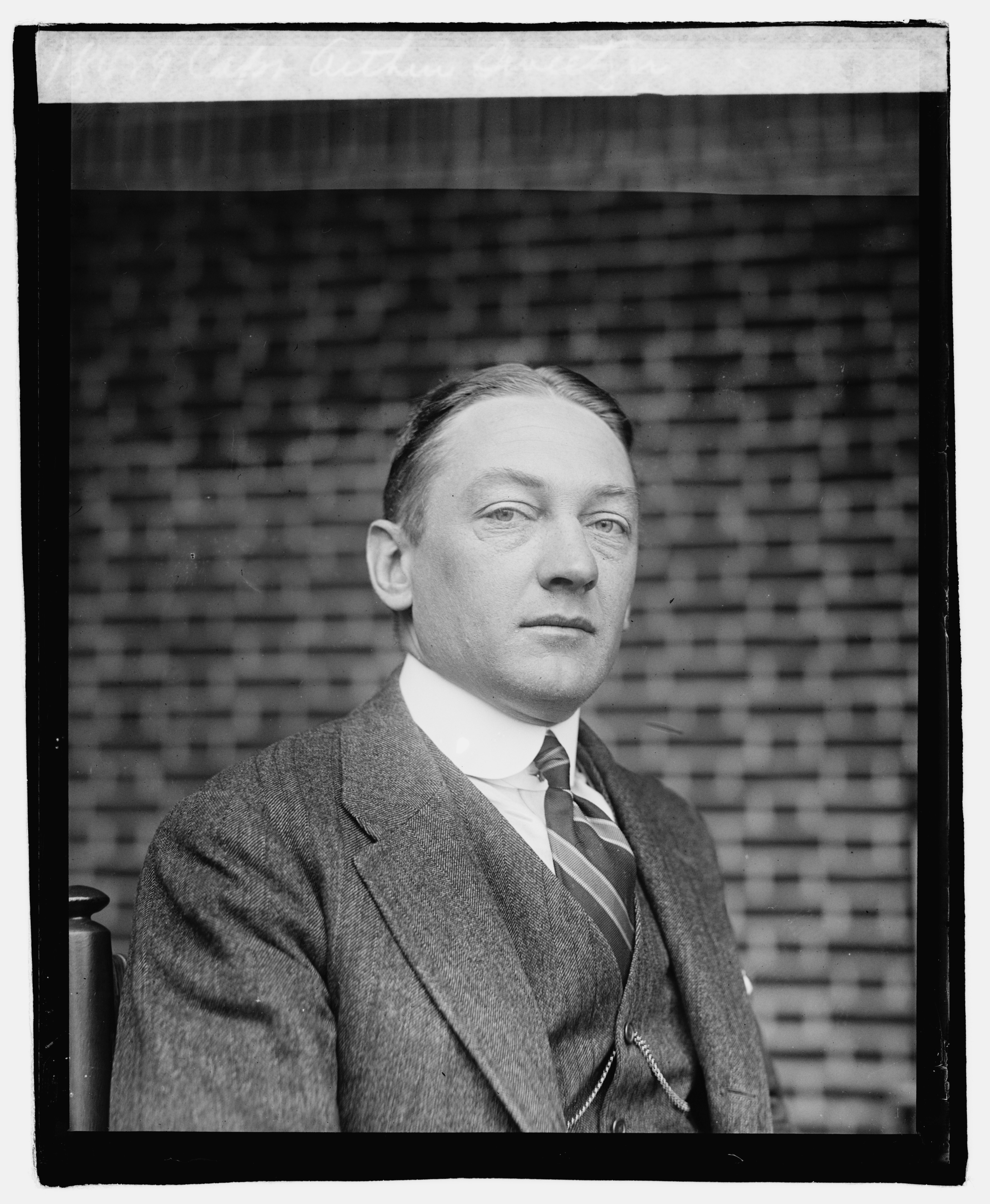

== Early life ==
Born in 1888, Arthur Sweetser was a member of a generation that saw the nations of the world engaging in violent bloodshed in what was labelled optimistically as the War to End all Wars. This was a period when contemporary principles of international law were first taking form and beginning to be put into practice. Following on the heels of World War I, there were many people who saw the urgency of developing greater cooperation among nations. Arthur Sweetser was one of these.

He came from a family that valued travel. His father wrote New England guidebooks. His uncle was a broker for a shipping firm. He traveled the world after graduating from Harvard College, then became a reporter, first for the Springfield Reporter and then for the Associated Press.

== Journalism career ==
In 1914, when war was declared in Europe, Arthur Sweetser worked as a war correspondent, traveling through the thick of the battle zones. His book, "Roadside Glimpses of the Great War," was a study of World War I from the vantage point of a reporter in the middle of the action.

He was assigned to the State Department by the Associated Press. He walked the halls with such great figures as Theodore Roosevelt, Henry Cabot Lodge, and Howard Taft. This was a period when U.S. isolationism was being questioned. The League to Enforce Peace was one effort to bring the U.S. and other countries into accord. Although this effort was not to succeed, the more successful League of Nations followed soon after.

Arthur Sweetser was present at the inception of the League of Nations in Paris in 1920. He was a member of the American Peace Commission appointed by Woodrow Wilson. Sweetser was directly involved in the League's development as a member of its provisional Secretariat in London and subsequently joined the permanent Secretariat in the League's Public Information Section.

== Role in education ==
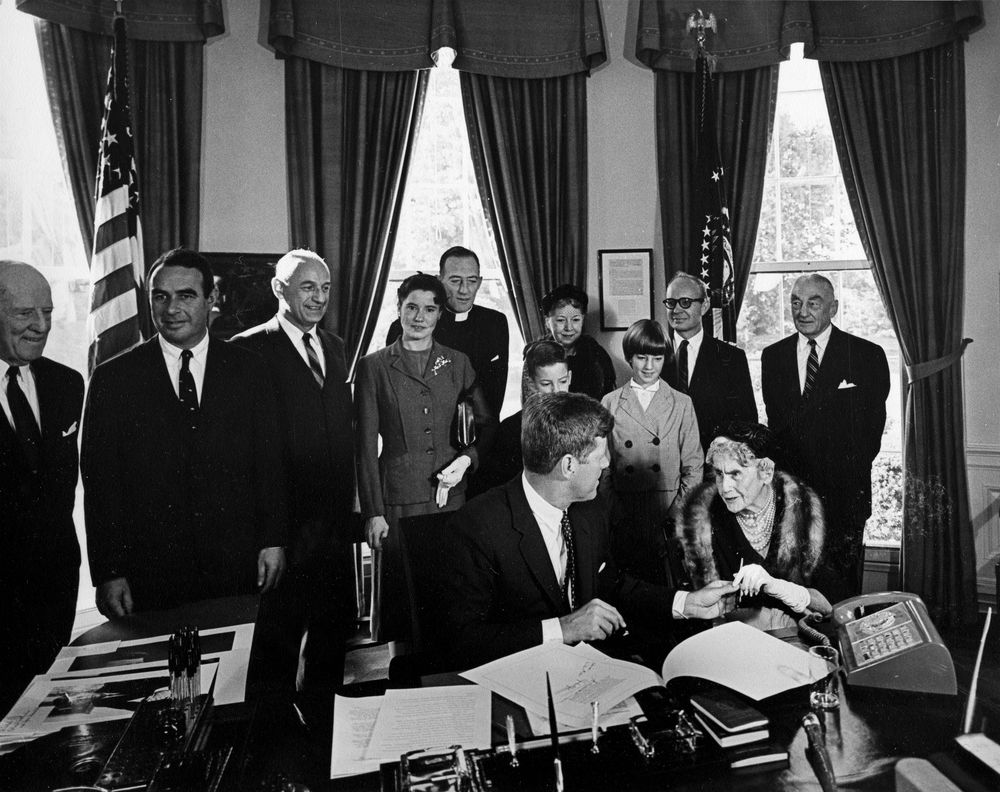
President John F. Kennedy signs S.J. Res. 51, authoring the creation of the Woodrow Wilson Memorial Commission, a commission to plan for the construction of a permanent memorial to President Woodrow Wilson in Washington, D.C. Seated (L – R): President Kennedy; Edith Wilson, wife of President Wilson. Standing (L – R): Francis B. Sayre, son-in-law of President Wilson; Senator Harrison A. Williams (New Jersey); Congressman Frank C. Osmers Jr. (New Jersey); Harriet Sayre, wife of Reverend Francis B. Sayre, Jr.; Reverend Sayre, grandson of President Wilson; Tom Sayre, Reverend Sayre's son (partially hidden); Margaret C. Brown, personal secretary to Mrs. Wilson; Jessie Sayer, Reverend Sayre's daughter; Under Secretary of the Interior John A. Carver Jr.; Arthur Sweetser, Director of the Woodrow Wilson Foundation. Oval Office, White House, Washington, D.C.

His work with the League led to his involvement with the International School of Geneva, the world's first international school, which he founded together with Ludwik Rajchman, Adolphe Ferrière and Paul Meyhoffer. This school was developed to accommodate the children of diplomats as well as others seeking a more diversified education, with a program offering multiple languages and a non-political, "education for peace" approach that would enable students to succeed in their home colleges. Sweetser's involvement exemplified his belief that an international education was essential if there was ever to be communication among the world powers.

One offspring of the evolution of international schools was the development of the International Baccalaureate (IB). The goal of this program, according to the organization's website is, "to help develop the intellectual, personal, emotional and social skills to live, learn and work in a rapidly globalizing world."

In addition to the accomplishments mentioned, Arthur Sweetser became the first head of the United Nations Information Office in Washington following the second World War. He was the first President of the Woodrow Wilson Foundation, and he wrote a great many books and articles on subjects pertaining to global policy, communication, and education. In addition to his participation as a co-founder of the International School of Geneva in 1924, he assisted in the creation of the United Nations International School in New York, and also founded International Schools Services.

The creation of International Schools Services, first named International Schools Foundation, came about in 1955. Sweetser noted that the insurgence of international and American schools across the globe had brought about a need for support for their educational programs, administration, and facilities. He established this non-profit group to provide these services. The company was available to help schools find high-quality faculty and materials and to provide the support that this growing sector would continue to need for future expansion.

== Death ==
Arthur Sweetser died in 1968, but he made a strong and resounding impact on international education and global affairs.
