= Chenu, Sarthe =

Chenu
- Commune
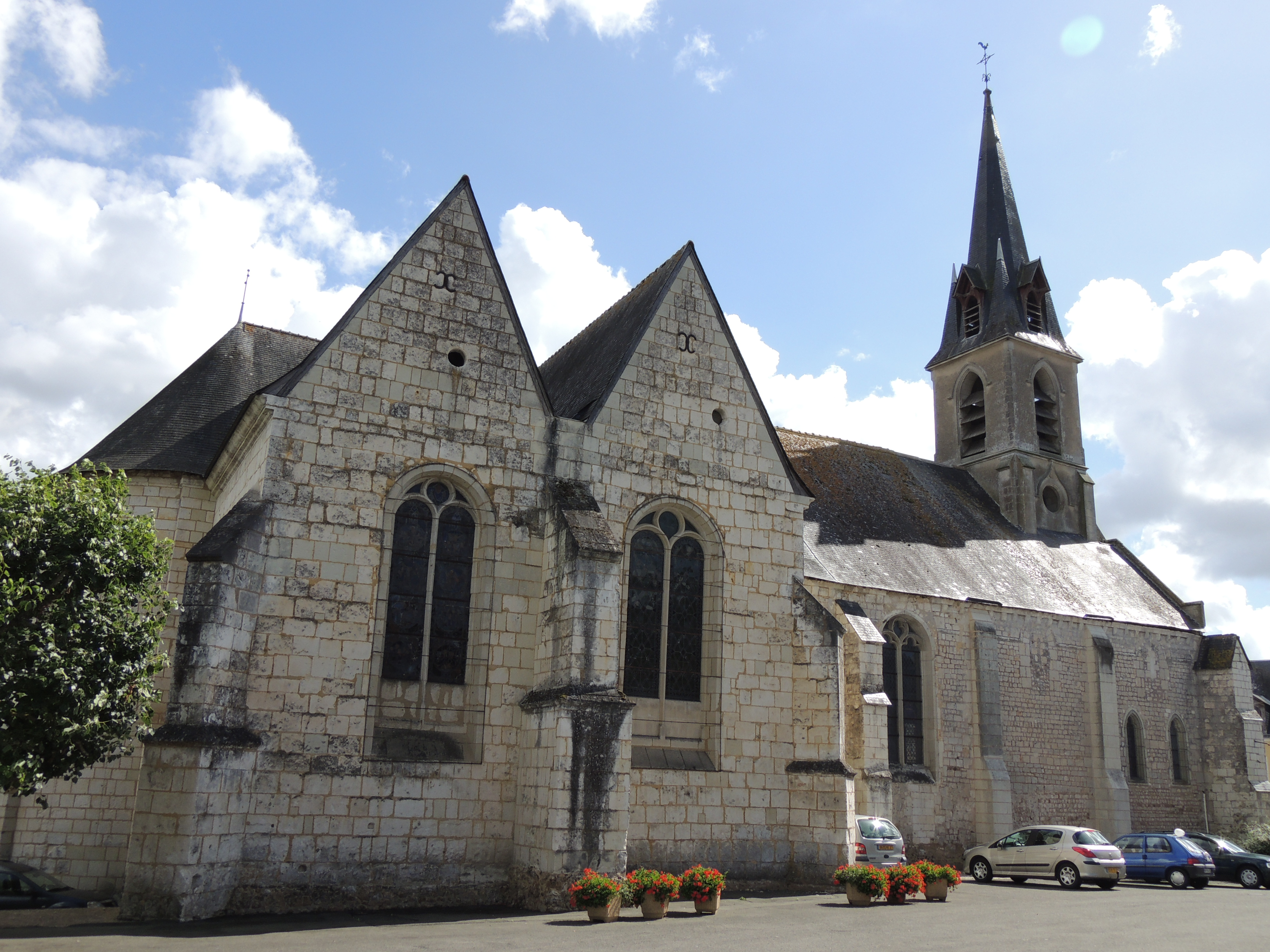
- The church of Saint Martin
- Location of Chenu
- Location within France Location within Pays de la Loire
- Coordinates: 47°36′46″N 0°20′14″E
- Country: France
- Region: Pays de la Loire
- Department: Sarthe
- Arrondissement: La Flèche
- Canton: Le Lude
- Intercommunality: Sud Sarthe

Government
  - Mayor (2022–2026): Thierry Lecerf
- Area^{1}: 30.8 km^{2} (11.9 sq mi)
- Population (2023): 421
  - Density: 13.7/km^{2} (35.4/sq mi)
- Demonym(s): Catonicien, Catonicienne
- Time zone: UTC+01:00 (CET)
  - Summer (DST): UTC+02:00 (CEST)
- INSEE/Postal code: 72077 /72500
- ^{1} French Land Register data, which excludes lakes, ponds, glaciers > 1 km^{2} (0.386 sq mi or 247 acres) and river estuaries.

Chenu (French pronunciation: [ʃəny]) is a commune in the Sarthe department in the Pays de la Loire region in north-western France.

== See also ==
- Communes of the Sarthe department
