= International Bureau of Education =

Organisation created in Geneva in 1925

- Abbreviation: IBE-UNESCO
- Formation: 1925; 101 years ago
- Legal status: Active
- Headquarters: Geneva, Switzerland
- Head: Director of the IBE a.i. Vacant
- Parent organization: United Nations Education, Scientific and Cultural Organization
- Website: www.ibe.unesco.org

The International Bureau of Education (IBE-UNESCO) is a UNESCO category 1 institute mandated as the Centre of Excellence in curriculum and related matters. Consistent with the declaration of the decision of the 36th session of the General Conference and to ensure a higher effectiveness and a sharper focus, the IBE has defined the scope of its work as pertaining to: curriculum, learning, teaching, and assessment. The IBE-UNESCO provides tailored technical support and expertise to all UNESCO Member States facilitating the provision and delivery of equitable, inclusive, high-quality education within the framework of Education 2030 Agenda.

== History ==
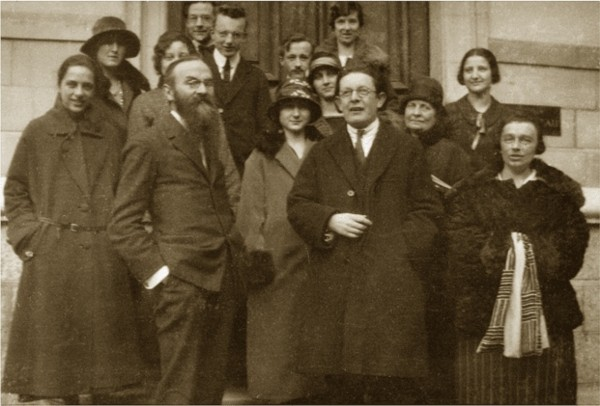
Pierre Bovet (left) and Jean Piaget in front of the Rousseau Institute in Geneva, 1925

The IBE was a private organization created in 1925 by prominent psychologists and pedagogues in Geneva, including Edouard Claparède, Adolphe Ferrière and Pierre Bovet, the latter of whom served as the Director of the IBE from 1925 to 1929. Initially, the IBE was a small non-governmental organization focused on public and private education, and scientific research. During this time, an external initiative committee consisting of notable academics, educators and thinkers of the day, including Albert Einstein, provided support to the organization. In 1929, it became the first intergovernmental organization dedicated to the field of education. Accordingly, in 1929, the well known epistemologist and professor Jean Piaget was appointed director of the organization. Piaget stayed on as Director until 1967.

=== Service of Intellectual Assistance to Prisoners of War (SIAP) ===
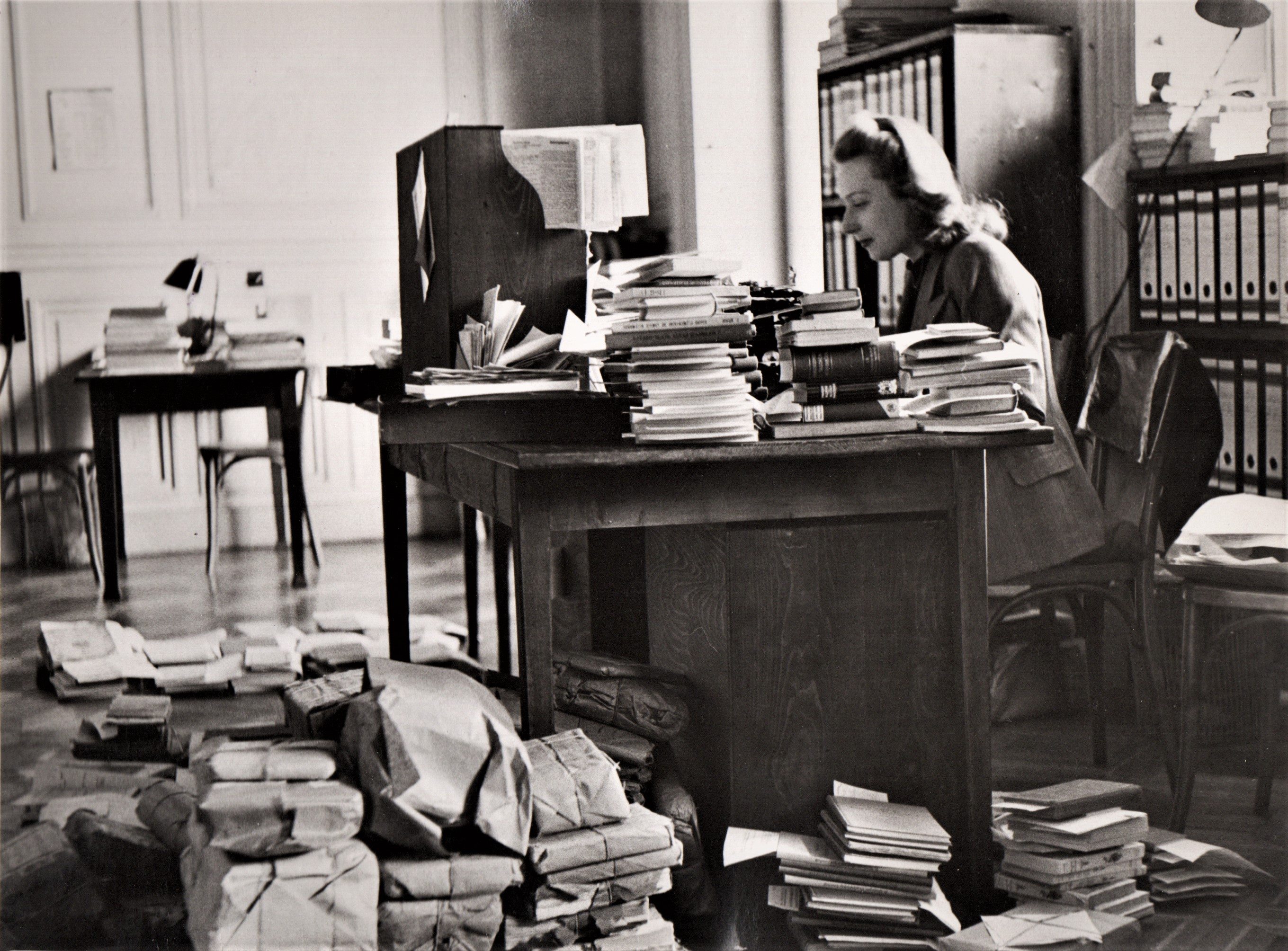
Preparation of books and parcels to be sent to prisoners during World War II as part of the IBE's SIAP project

In 1939, the IBE created the Service of Intellectual Assistance to Prisoners of War (SIAP), which was based on Article 39 of the Convention relative to the Treatment of Prisoners of War. SIAP was initiated with the intention of sending books and providing intellectual services to prisoners during World War II. The IBE collaborated with the International Committee of the Red Cross (ICRC), who provided intelligence for the service. The project quickly grew in scale, and by the end of the war the IBE had provided over half a million books to prisoners. SIAP also organized so-called “Internment Universities” and study groups in prison camps. The service was initially funded by the Swiss Federal Council, but increased demand required the search for other funding alternatives. As a result, the IBE began to issue postal stamps in 1940, which were sold in order to raise money to fund the project.

=== Relationship and integration with UNESCO ===
The IBE was an independent organization for the first 44 years of its existence. When UNESCO was created in 1945, the IBE helped develop its education programs, thus establishing the first of many collaborations with the nascent UN agency. By 1952, a permanent joint commission was established to ensure effective cooperation between the IBE and UNESCO, and they began to jointly organize the International Conference on Public Education. After 20 years of collaboration, an agreement was signed which would integrate the IBE with UNESCO. In 1969, the IBE joined UNESCO; however, it maintained intellectual and functional autonomy. The IBE is the oldest of UNESCO's category 1 institutes.

== Main area of development ==
Originally, the IBE was developed to provide support and research regarding all aspects of education; however, it gradually became more specialized. Today, under the direction of Mmantsetsa Marope, the main initiative of the IBE is to set the global standard for quality curricula, especially in the context of promoting education for development. Other areas of focus include the learning sciences and future competencies.

The IBE works primarily in 6 programmatic areas in the context of the IBE's three main areas of focus: Curriculum, Learning, and Assessment. Those 6 programmes are: Innovation and Leadership; Current and Critical Issues; Knowledge Creation and Management; Systemic Strengthening of Quality and Development Relevance; Leadership for Global Dialogue; and, Institutional and Organizational Development.

== International Conference on Education (ICE) ==
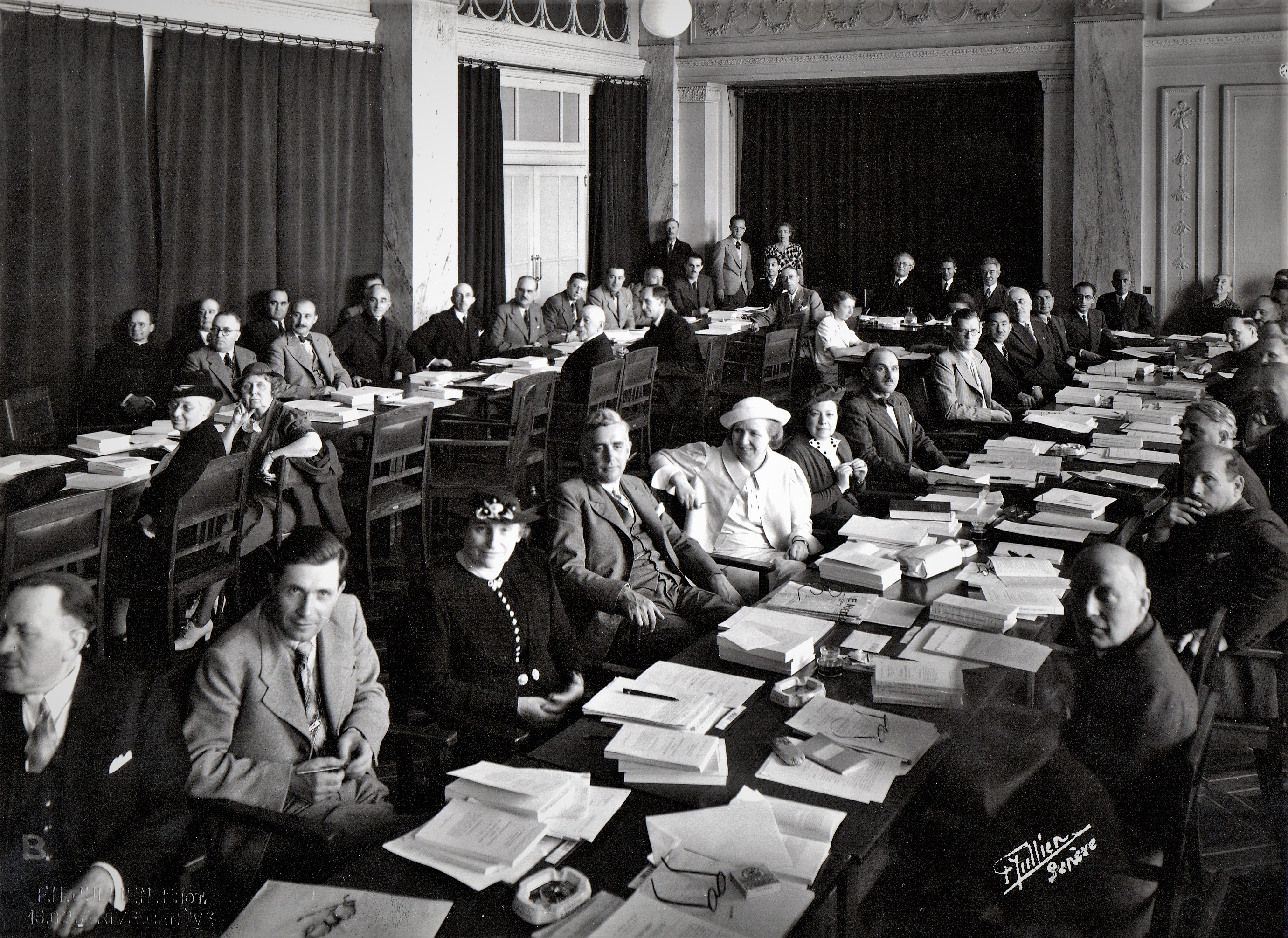
Seventh International Conference on Public Education in 1938. The IBE organized the ICE from 1934 to 2008.

From 1934 to 2008, the IBE organized the International Conference on Public Education (later known as the International Conference on Education). Jean Piaget and Deputy Director Pedro Rosselló developed the conference in order to bring together Ministers of Education with researchers and practitioners in the field of education. A total of 48 sessions took place with themes including inclusive education, quality education, and strengthening teachers.

== Prospects ==
Since 1970, the IBE has edited the academic comparative journal Prospects, which focuses on curriculum, learning, and assessment, particularly in the domains of culture, development, economics, ethics, gender, inclusion, politics, sociology, sustainability, and education. It is published by Springer Netherlands, and available in English, Arabic, and Mandarin Chinese.

== IBE Library ==
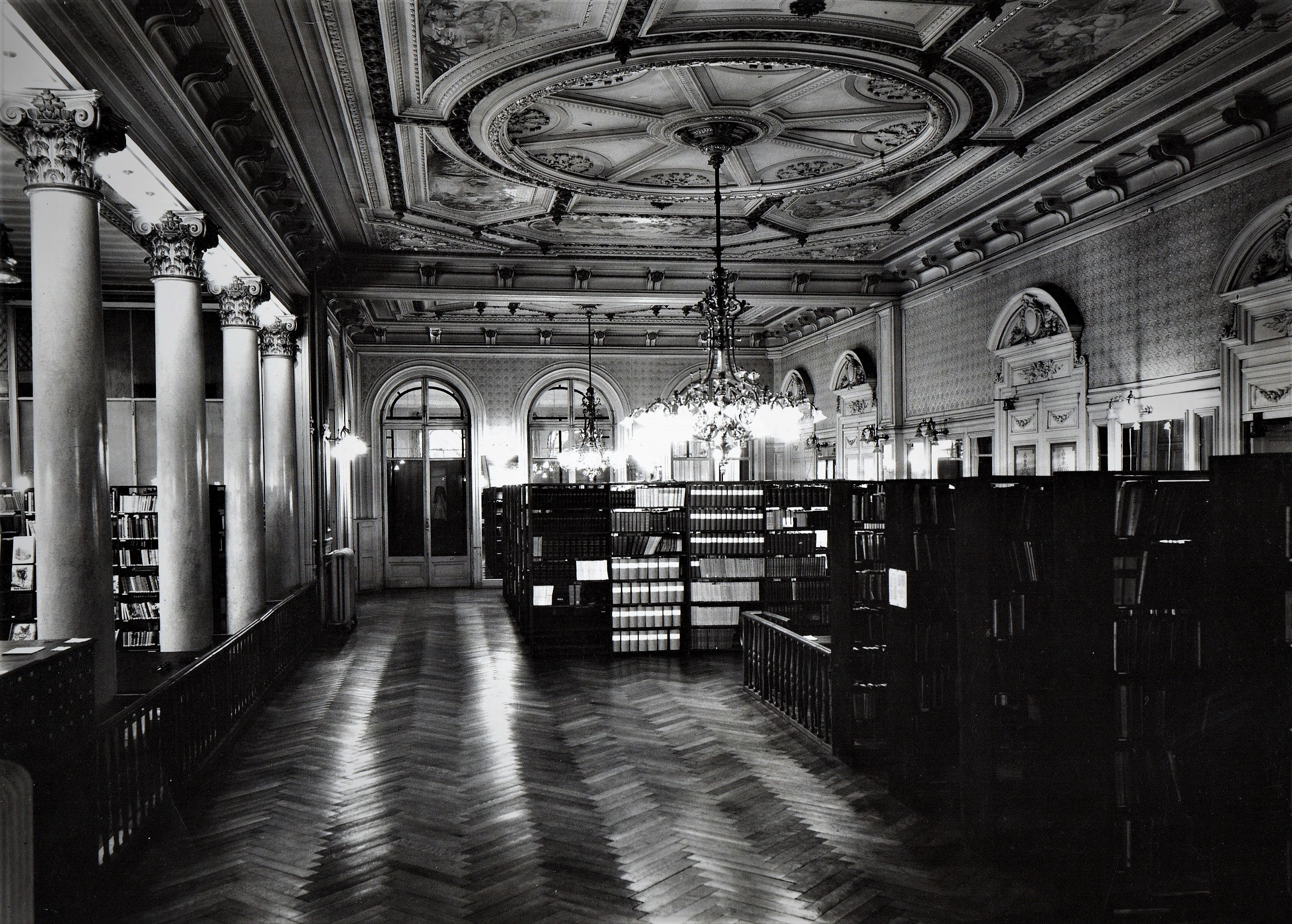
The IBE Library at the Palais Wilson in 1937

The IBE Library (also known as the IBE-UNESCO Documentation Centre) has serviced educators, psychologists, and researchers for nine decades. Originally located in the rue des Maraichers, it was also quartered in the historic Palais Wilson in Geneva. The Library was initiated when the IBE began transferring educational journals to the former Library of the League of Nations in the late 1930s. Notable collections of the IBE Library include the IBE Historical Textbook Collection and the IBE Historical Archives 1925–1969.

=== IBE Historical Textbook Collection ===
The IBE Historical Textbook Collection consists of over 20,000 primary and secondary education textbooks and atlases from as early as the 18th century, from over 140 countries, in over 100 languages. The collection also features a number of textbooks in rare languages, such as Guarao, Luvale, Maori, and Irish Gaelic.

=== IBE Historical Archives 1925–1969 ===
The IBE Historical Archives 1925–1969 traces the evolution of education from the early 20th century to the modern and creative learning methods of the 1960s. It includes photographs, letters, manuscripts, notes, etc. that belonged to the renowned Swiss educators such as Pierre Bovet and Adolphe Ferrière. The archives provide an introspective look at the development and evolution of the New Education movement, of which many of the IBE's founders were integral contributors.

== See also ==
- List of international organizations based in Geneva
- Marie Butts
- Rousseau Institute
