= Édouard Claparède =

Swiss neurologist, child psychologist and educator

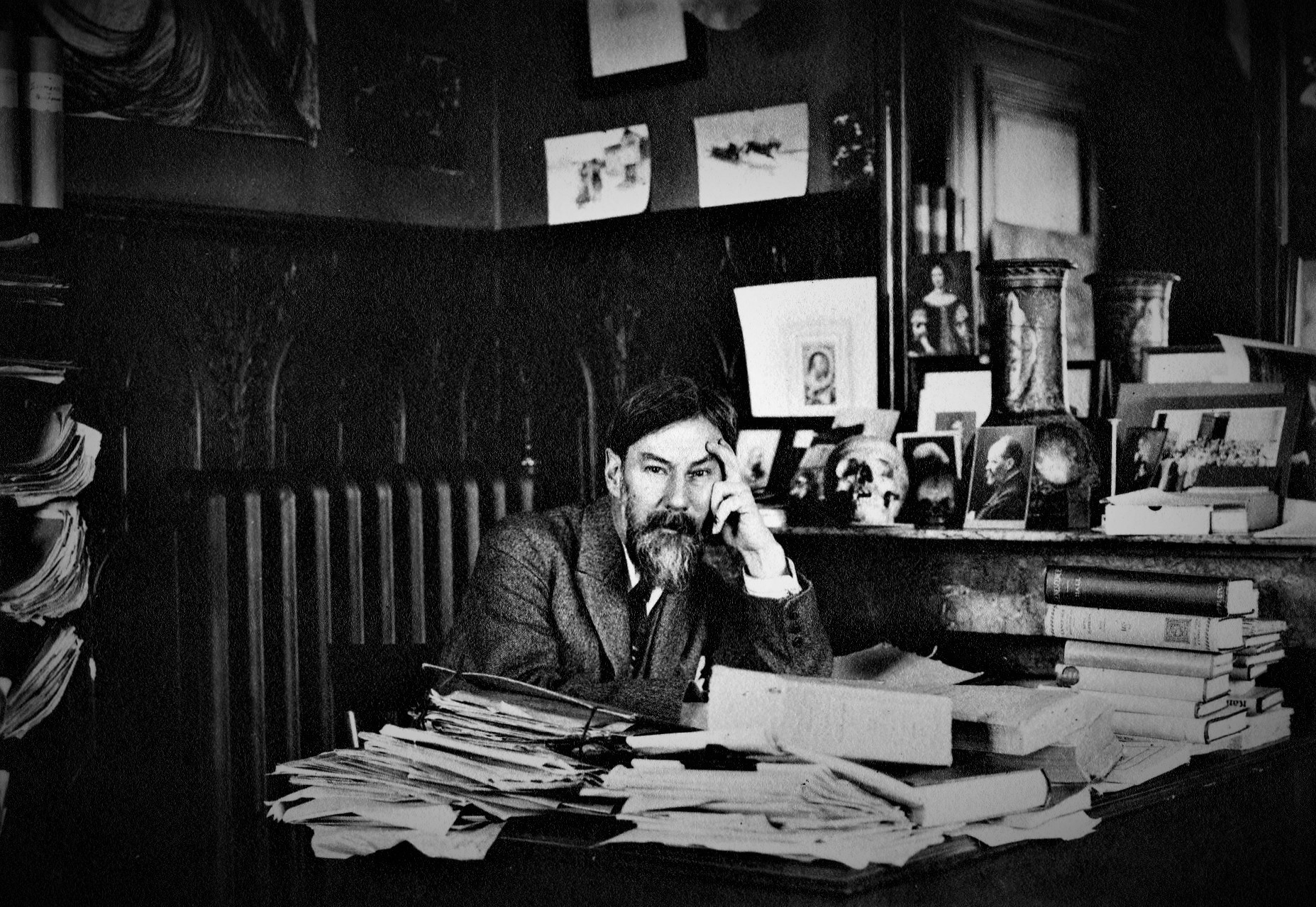
- Born: 24 March 1873; Geneva, Switzerland
- Died: 29 September 1940 (aged 67); Geneva, Switzerland
- Education: University of Geneva
- Known for: Genevan School
- Scientific career
- Fields: Neurology
- Workplaces: Rousseau Institute, International Bureau of Education

Édouard Claparède (French: [klapaʁɛd]; 24 March 1873 – 29 September 1940) was a Swiss neurologist, child psychologist, and educator.

== Career ==
Claparède studied science and medicine, receiving in 1897 an MD from the University of Geneva, and working 1897–98 at La Salpêtrière hospital in Paris. In 1901 he founded the Archives de psychologie with his cousin, Théodore Flournoy, which he edited until his death. He was based from 1904 onward at the University of Geneva, where he became director of the experimental psychology lab.

Among the positions he held were: 1904 General Secretary at the Second International Congress of Psychology; 1909 General Secretary at the Sixth International Congress of Psychology; 1912 founder of the Rousseau Institute; Founder and President (1920-1940) of the Association Internationale de Psychotechnique (now the International Association of Applied Psychology); co-founder of the International Bureau of Education (IBE) in 1925; 1915-1940 professor of psychology at the University of Geneva in succession to Flournoy; Permanent Secretary at the International Congress of Psychology; Life President of the Comité de l'Association Internationale des Conferences de Psychotechnique.

Claparède was married to Hélène Spir, daughter of the Russian philosopher African Spir.

== Trauma experiment ==
Claparède performed an influential experiment demonstrating how the trauma of a painful event could be retained even if short-term memory was lost. His experiment involved a woman who suffered from a form of amnesia. She had all of her old memories as well as her basic reasoning skills, but the recent past was not remembered. Claparède had greeted her every day, but each time she could not remember his face at all. Then during one session of the experiment, Claparède hid a pin in his hand and reached to shake the woman's hand, pricking her. The next day, sure enough, she did not remember him. But when Claparède went to shake her hand, he found that she hesitated, recognizing a threat when her memory had been severely damaged.

== Freudianism ==
Claparède was briefly a member of the Zurich Freud Group marshalled by C. G. Jung, but he shunned what he saw as the movement's dogmatism, and in 1909 joined Pierre Janet in differentiating the clinical concept of the subconscious from what was termed Freud's philosophical concept of the unconscious. However he retained an interest in psychoanalysis in general, and in 1926 provided an introduction to the first French translation of Freud's Five Lectures on Psycho-Analysis.

== Works ==
Claparède wrote several books concerning the fields he studied including the following:

- L’association des idées (1903)
- Psychologie de l’enfant et pédagogie expérimentale (1909)
- L’éducation fonctionnelle (1931)
- La genèse de l’hypothèse (1933)

== See also ==
- Cryptamnesia
- Operant conditioning
