= Rousseau Institute =

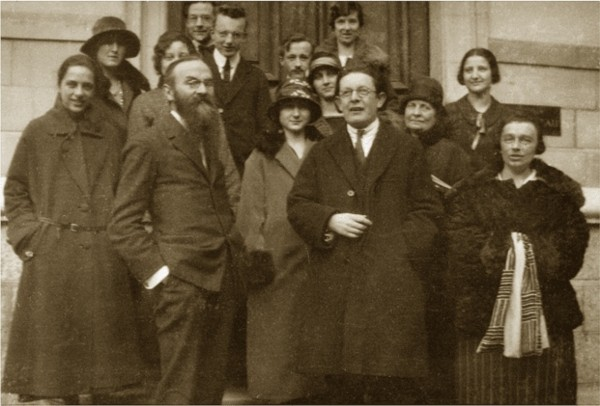
Rousseau Institute

Rousseau Institute (also known as the Jean-Jacques Rousseau Institute; French: Institut Jean-Jacques Rousseau, Academy of Geneva) is a private school in Geneva, Switzerland. It is considered the first institute of educational sciences founded in Europe when it opened and gained international influence as the originator of the scientific approach to education phenomena. It became part of the University of Geneva (Faculty of Psychology and School of Education).

== History ==
In 1912, Édouard Claparède (1873–1940) created an institute to turn educational theory into a science. This new institution was given the name of Jean-Jacques Rousseau, to whom Claparède attributed the "Copernican reversal" of putting the child, rather than the teacher, at the centre of the educational process (cf. Thomas Kuhn's notion of paradigm shift).

The founder of the Institute appointed as director Pierre Bovet (1878–1965), whom he considered to be both a philosophical and rigorously scientific person. Between 1921 and 1925, Jean Piaget (1896–1980) took over the reins, soon conferring on Genevan experimental psychology its far-reaching renown. According to Piaget, he came to organize his research once he arrived at the Institute in such a way that he "gain objectively and inductively knowledge about the elementary structures of intelligence" and use it develop a psychological and biological epistemology. It was to Piaget's dismay, however, that his theoretical work was not as successful. He was the director of the Institute until he died in 1980.

In his eulogy at Claparède's funeral, Bovet highlighted his friend's profound attachment for Geneva and the broad international influence rapidly attained by the institute he had created; his capacity, in short, to be at the same time of a local land and of the greater world.

== Connection with the International Bureau of Education (IBE) ==
In 1925, the governing board of the Rousseau Institute voted to establish the International Bureau of Education (IBE), which is now a category 1 institute of UNESCO. The governing board received a $5000 grant from the Rockefeller Foundation to found the IBE. Rousseau Institute director Pierre Bovet became the first director of the IBE, and fellow governing board members Adolphe Ferriere and Elisabeth Rotten were appointed as his deputies.
