= Pierre Bovet =

Swiss psychologist and pedagogue

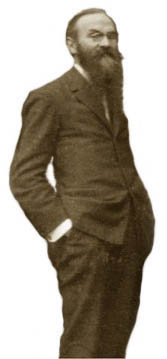
- Born: 5 June 1878; Grandchamp
- Died: 2 June 1965 (aged 86); Boudry
- Known for: Translation of Scouting for Boys
- Medical career
- Profession: Psychologist and pedagogue

Pierre Bovet (born on 5 June 1878 in Grandchamp (commune of Boudry); died in Boudry on 2 December 1965) was a Swiss psychologist and pedagogue.

Bovet took up the translation of Scouting for Boys and other Scout books, to make it the first edition in French.
