= Felicitas Kukuck =

German composer

Felicitas Kukuck (2 November 1914 – 4 June 2001) was a German music educator and composer of opera and other works.

== Biography ==
Felicitas Kukuck was born in Hamburg in 1914. Her parents encouraged their daughter's artistic development from childhood and enabled her to attend good music schools. Her teachers included Eduard Zuckmayer (music), Edith Weiss-Mann (piano) and Robert Müller-Hartmann (harmony). Until 1933 she attended the Montessori oriented Lichtwark. The Nazi seizure of power marked a turning point in her life, as she learned that she had Jewish ancestors. She moved to Martin Luserke's "Schule am Meer" on Juist Island, and completed her studies in 1935 at the Odenwald School.

After graduating, Kukuck studied piano and flute at the Berlin Musikhochschule, and in 1937 she successfully passed the examination to become a private music teacher. She studied composition with Paul Hindemith until his emigration, and in 1939 Felicitas Kukuck closed her musical studies.

Felicitas Kukuck was born a Cohnheim, but her father changed this Jewish name in 1916 to Kestner. Her parents emigrated to England, but Felicitas stayed in Germany. In 1939 she married Dietrich Kukuck and a sympathetic state official protected her real name on the marriage certificate so she could continue to live in Germany.

In 1945 her home was destroyed in the war, and Felicitas Kukuck and her son moved by refugee transport to Hamburg where her husband joined her. In 1948, she moved with her family to Hamburg-Blankenese, where she lived and worked until her death in 2001.

She was a member of the artists organization GEDOK, the Community Work Group of the Association Ecumenical Lyricists and Composers, the Working Group Music of the Protestant Youth Association, today's lyricists and composers group STROKE.

== Works ==
In 1969 Kukuck founded the chamber choir Kammerchor Blankenese, which participated in the premiere of many works with her, including the church opera The Man Moses (1986) and Ecce Homo (1991), the cantata "De Profundis" (1989), "Burning coals sung on" (1990), "And it was: Hiroshima", "Who was Nicholas of Myra?" and "Swords into plowshares" (1995), the motets "Death Fugue", "Psalm", "Oh, the crying children night" and "O the Chimneys" (1994), "It is you, O man", "The Beatitudes" and "Everything has its time" (1995) and "Ten songs against the war" (1996).

The cantata "And there was Hiroshima: A collage of the beginning and end of creation" was launched on 11 August 1995 with a premiere during a peace week in Hamburg. The cantata "Who was Nicholas of Myra, how a bishop of his city saved them from famine and war" was also premiered in 1995 on the occasion of the 800th anniversary of the Hamburg Church of St. Nikolai. In 1996 she created "Seven Songs" for female voice and piano to the poems of a girl to her boyfriend of Selma Meerbaum-Eisinger, an eighteen-year-old girl who died in a concentration camp.

In 1989, Kukuck was honored with the Biermann Ratjen Medal for her contributions to art and culture in Hamburg. In 1994, she was honored with the Johannes Brahms Medal for her contributions to the musical life of Hamburg and in recognition of outstanding achievements in the field of music. Founded in 2006, "Singkreis Felicitas Kukuck" is an ensemble conducted by Christoph Leis-Bendorff and dedicated to the vocal works of Kukuck.

As she grew older, Kukuck continued to compose almost daily. Her two most well-known pieces are the melody to the hymn "Manchmal kennen wir Gottes Willen (Sometimes We Know God's Will)" and the song "Es führt über den Main (It Goes Over the Main)".

== Other important works ==
- "Sonata for Flute and Piano", premiered in 1941 in Berlin
- "Annunciation," UA 1951
- "The coming kingdom," premiered in 1953 in Hamburg
- "The Servant", premiered in 1959 in Hamburg and Berlin
- "Missa Sancti Archangeli Gabrieli," UA 1968 in Hamburg
- "Where are you comfort," premiered in 1974 in Hannover
- "The Conference of the Animals", first performed in 1982 in Hamburg
- "Lamentations of Jeremiah," premiered in 1984 in Hamburg
- "Herod the game," UA 1988 in Stockholm and Copenhagen
- "From Mercy", premiered in Hamburg in 1997
