= Fritz Hafner =

German painter

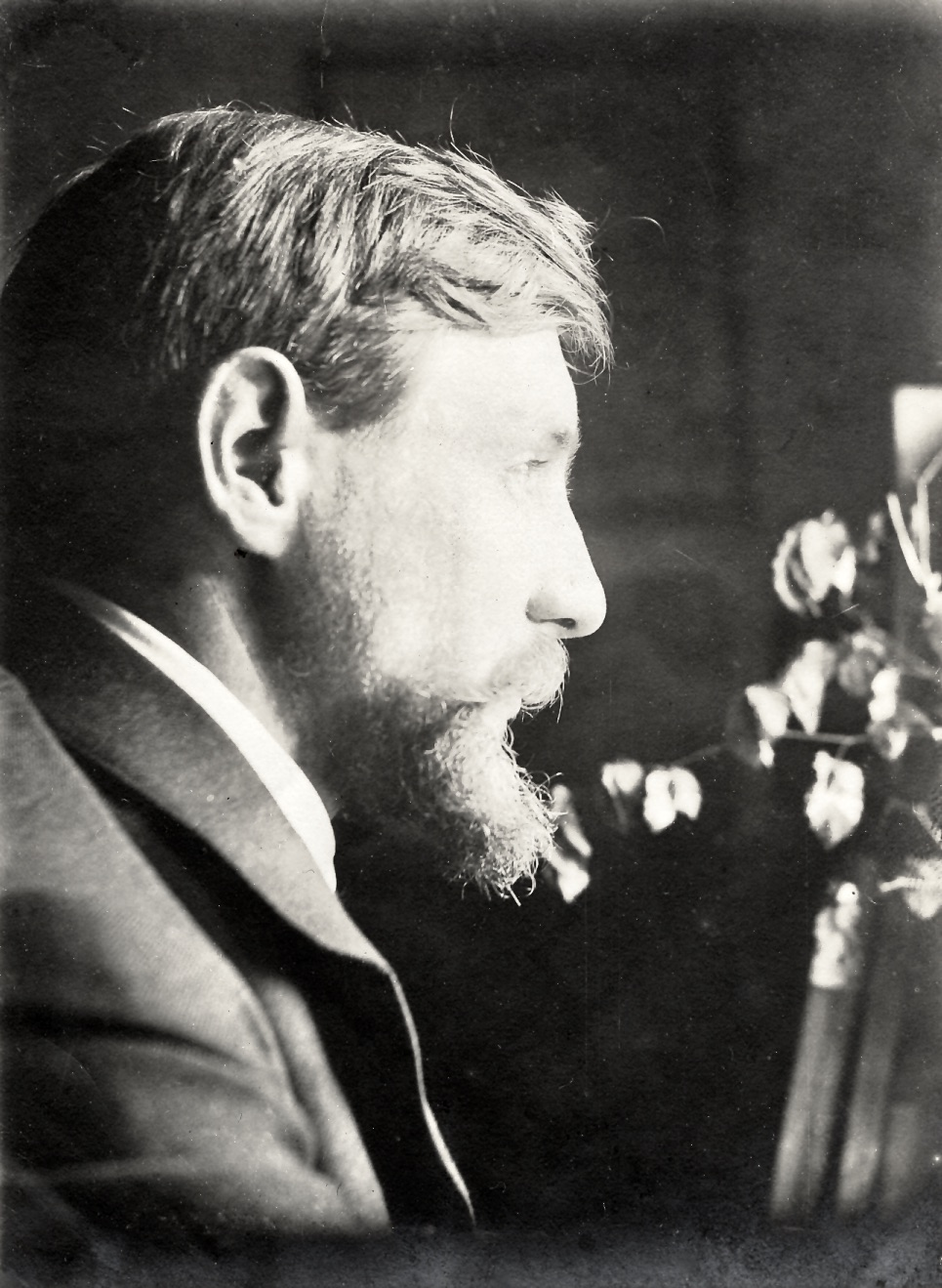
Fritz Hafner

Fritz Hafner (10 December 1877 – 21 November 1964) was an Austrian-German painter and visual arts educator.

== Life ==
He was born in Vienna, Austria. When he was a boy, Hafner had already developed a talent for painting nature, trying to capture his impressions of the landscape and its fauna. Later, when he had reached his limits as an amateur, he decided to learn painting professionally. At 19, he applied for a place at the State Academy of Fine Arts in Stuttgart and studied for eight years with Carlos Grethe, Jakob Grünenwald, Robert von Haug, and Franz Herterich, and also with Wilhelm Steinhausen in Frankfurt. Due to his performance, he received a scholarship for both a studio and lodging as well as a grant to study for six months in Italy.

At that time the Art Academy aimed to empower aspiring artists to paint pictures for exhibitions. Hafner, however, was not compliant. It took years before he succeeded. He made amends with a return to his early passion. While his colleagues concentrated on the turn of the 19th and 20th centuries and mainly modern styles, Hafner found his artistic fulfillment in painting flowers and landscapes. His love of Far Eastern painting also served as an inspiration.

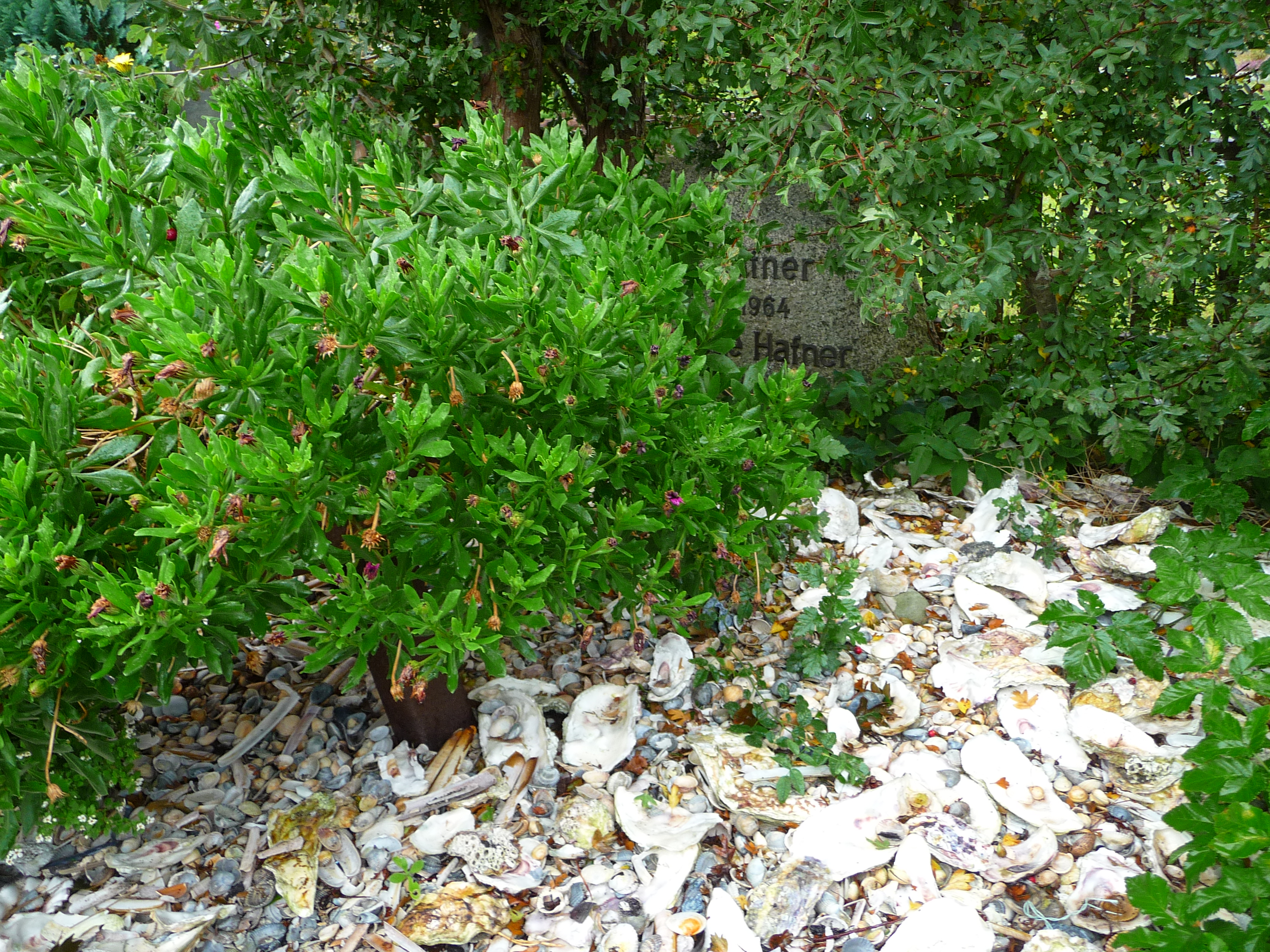
Grave of Christel and Fritz Hafner in Hage, East Friesland

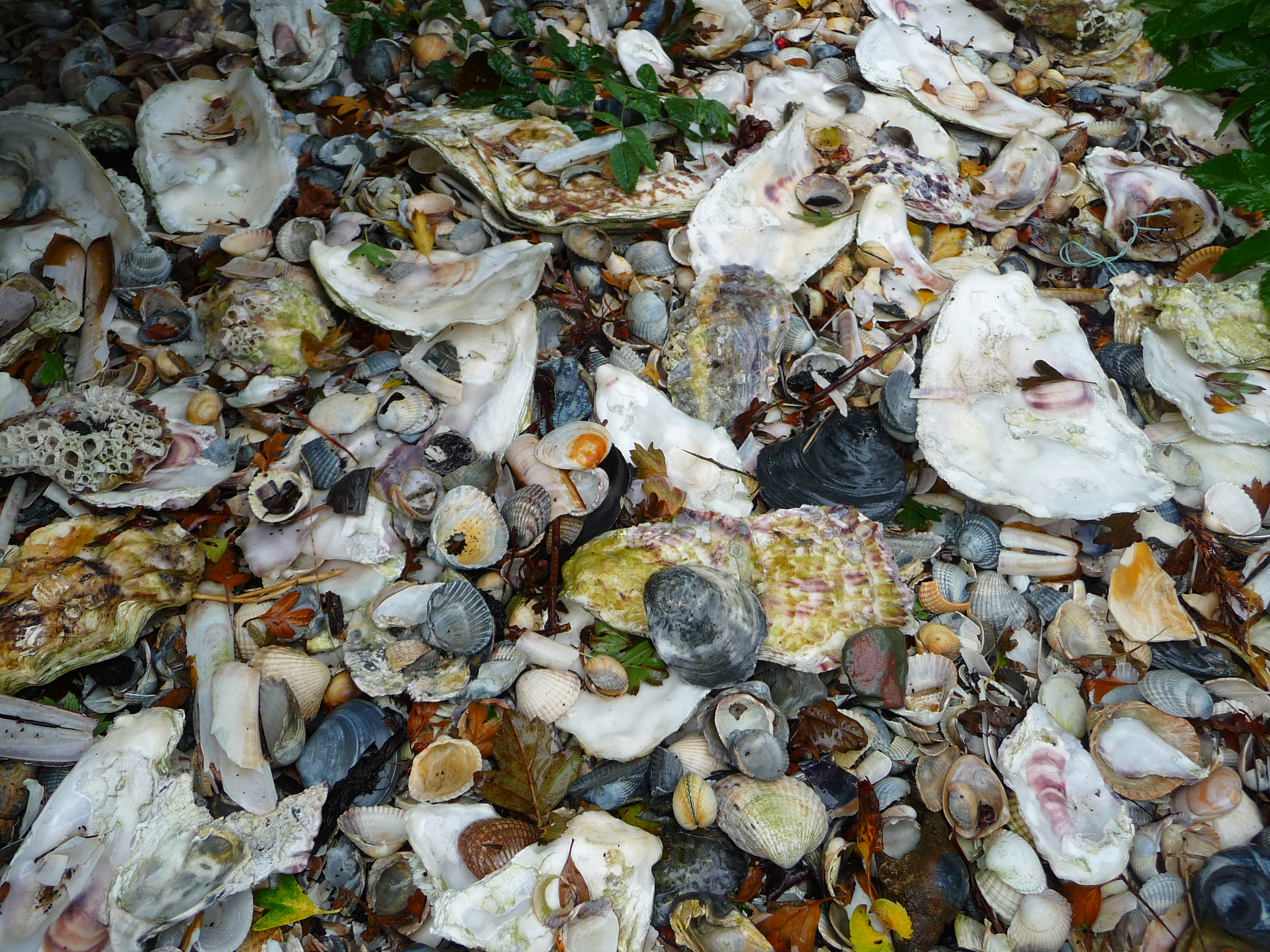
Decorations on the grave of objects found on the beach

In 1907, he moved from Stuttgart to Thuringia, where he worked in an outdoor school community in Wickersdorf as an art and science teacher, which was his first job. Together with the reform of educators and principals Martin Luserke and other fellow teachers, such as Rudolf Aeschlimann and Paul Reiner, he moved, in 1925, to the North Sea island of Juist, where was a co-founder of "Schule am Meer", a reform school that was run as a boarding school. Just as previously in Wickersdorf, he worked in Loog Juist as an art and science teacher. By that point, he had become fascinated with the hilly landscapes of Württemberg, Thuringia, and Italy, and their flora and the process of painting a shoal at the Wadden Sea. He painted there, with his paintings being characterized for their finely nuanced watercolors.

After the school closed in 1934 for economic and political reasons, Hafner remained in Loog with his wife Christel and their three children. He was forced by the loss of his income to enter his works in well-known exhibitions in major cities in Germany and to sell them if possible. This proved to be a difficult struggle, as he had to carry them with him, and also because he painted really only for himself and not with commercial interest. He therefore found it hard to be separated from his works.

The Natural History Teaching Aids, a collection made at Schule am Meer, presented by Hafner around 1934 or 1935, was a small museum on the island of Juist with his exhibits on display. He agreed with the idea and was given the management of the museum, which he directed from 1934 to 1953, while his collection of paintings continued to expand. His love for the various types of mussels and snails was shown in a book which he devoted to the subject. Hafner died in 1964 in Juist.

Hafners' approximately 1,000 images (watercolors, drawings, oil paintings and sketches) are partly privately owned; the vast majority, however, are at the Küstenmuseum in Juist. Hafner is buried next to his wife in the cemetery in Hage in East Friesland.

== Works ==
- Wald bei Wickersdorf (Thüringen) - originally from the private collection of Gustav Wyneken (1875–1964)
- Emmy Coerper: Jahrbuch - 12 hand colored drawings, privately printed. Darmstadt 1937
- Kunstdruckmappe mit 6 Aquarelldrucken - 35 x 45 cm, Trobitsch. Frankfurt an der Oder 1937
- Strandflora – watercolor studies, four color prints in: Illustrierte Zeitung, Leipzig 2 June 1938.
- Nordseemuscheln – species and forms, with 75 pen drawings, Florian Kupferberg. Berlin 1939.
- Hans Kolde: Fritz Hafner, 40 Jahre Kunstschaffen auf Juist. In: Ostfriesland. Calendar for everyone. 68, 1985, S. 96, I-VIII (with 24 illustrations including a self-portrait).

== Honors ==
In 1947, while living in the eastern Friesland countryside, he was awarded for his lifetime achievements.
