= Nazife Güran =

Turkish composer

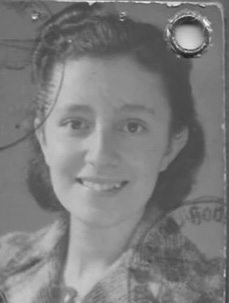
Nazife Aral in 1938

Avniye Nazife Aral Güran (Nazife Güran, born Aral) (5 September 1921 – 20 December 1993) was a Turkish composer and pianist, born in Vienna of a diplomat father. She is one of the first Turkish female composers to write classical music. She studied music as a child with her mother and completed primary education in Ankara and high school in Istanbul. She continued her music education at the Berlin Hochschule Music Academy, studying with Rudolph Schmidt for piano and Paul Hoffer for composition. After returning to Ankara, she studied with Ernst Praetorius.

In 1952, she married Dr. Ismail Yilmaz Güran, had a son the next year, and then continued her studies at the Cologne Music Academy. Returning to Turkey in 1969, she taught music at Cemberlitas Girls' High School and continued work as a composer.

== Works ==
Nazife composed over a thousand works. Selected compositions include:

- Merdiven
- Şehit Çocuğuna Ninni
- Gece Deniz
- Yarını Bekleyen Köy
- Hayalimdeki Bahçe
- Titreşim
- Nurdan Bir Hale (Light from a Halo)
- İbadet Sevinci
- Mehlika Sultan
- Dantel
- Göldeki Akisler
- Boğaziçinde Gezi
- Feraceli Hanım Nr.3

Her music has been recorded and issued on media, including:

- Nazife Güran - Nurdan Bir Hale (September 22, 2006) Kalan Ses, ASIN: B002ISM2XA
