= Bruno Ahrends =

German architect

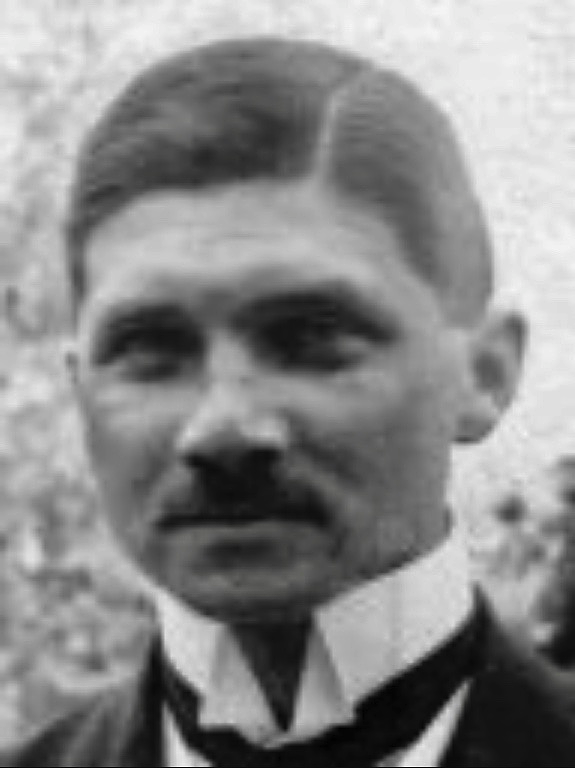
Bruno Ahrends, 1910s

Bruno Ahrends (1878–1948), born as Bruno Arons, was an internationally known German architect, who worked in Berlin, Germany. He was a representative of Berlin Modernism Housing Estates before World War I and during Weimar Republic (1910s to 1930s). Most of his creations today are under Cultural heritage management, some are part of a World Heritage Site.

== Life ==
=== Family ===
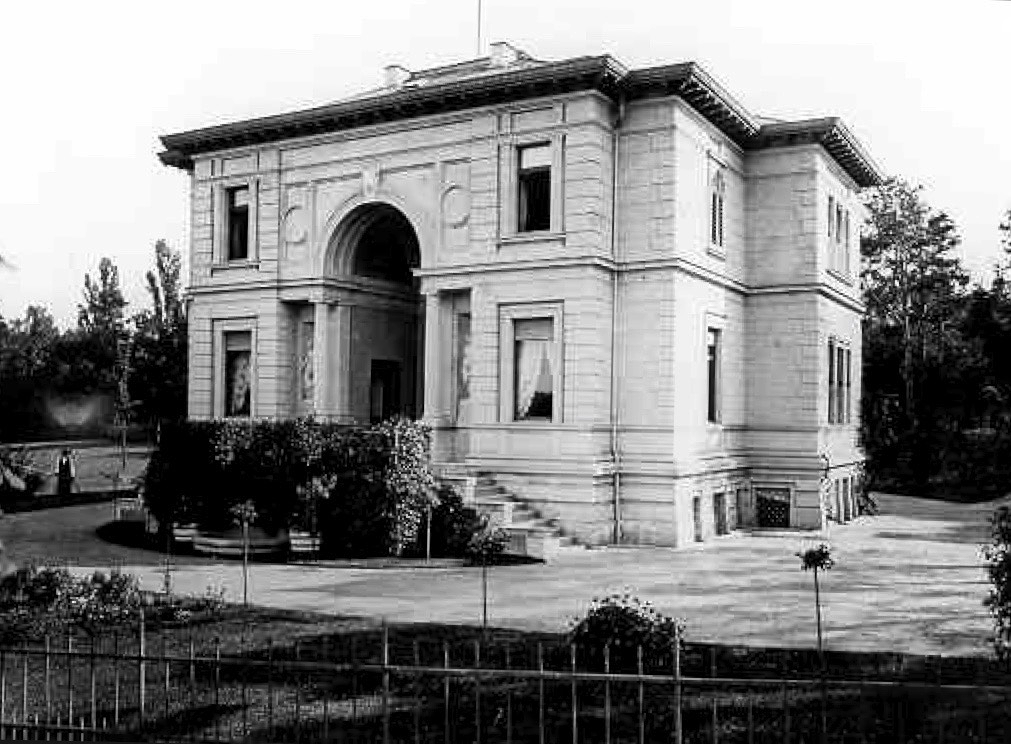
Villa Arons located at Großer Wannsee southwest of Berlin, where Bruno Arons was raised after 1880

Bruno Arons was born in Berlin, Germany on 9 April 1878 as the eldest son of Berlin banker Barthold Arons (1850–1933) and his wife Bertha (1855–1932). He was raised in wealthy conditions in Villa Arons, close to Großer Wannsee southwest of Germany's capital. He had two younger siblings, Katharine (1879–1969) and Edmund (1883–1965). His uncle was the entrepreneur, philanthropist and patron of the arts, Henri James Simon.

Due to cultural assimilation, in 1904, he changed his biblical family name Arons to the German-sounding Ahrends, possibly at the same time that he and his siblings converted to Christianity. That same year, he married Johanna Springer (1882–1970), the granddaughter of German publisher Julius Springer. They became three sons and one daughter, Hans Peter Bruno Ahrends (1905–2001), Steffen Ahrends (1907–1992), who also became an architect, Marianne (1910–1994) and Gottfried Bruno (born 1917).

=== Education ===
Ahrends wanted to study Shipbuilding at Kaiserliche Werft in Kiel, but at imperial shipyards, any participation of Jews was excluded. When visiting the Alsatian city of Strasbourg, Ahrends was so impressed by the Strasbourg Cathedral that he turned to architecture. He studied at the Technical University of Munich and later at Technische Hochschule Charlottenburg. After graduating in 1903 he worked as a referendary for the public construction works managements of the cities Magdeburg and Hanover. During that time, Ahrends completed his second state examination.

=== Work ===
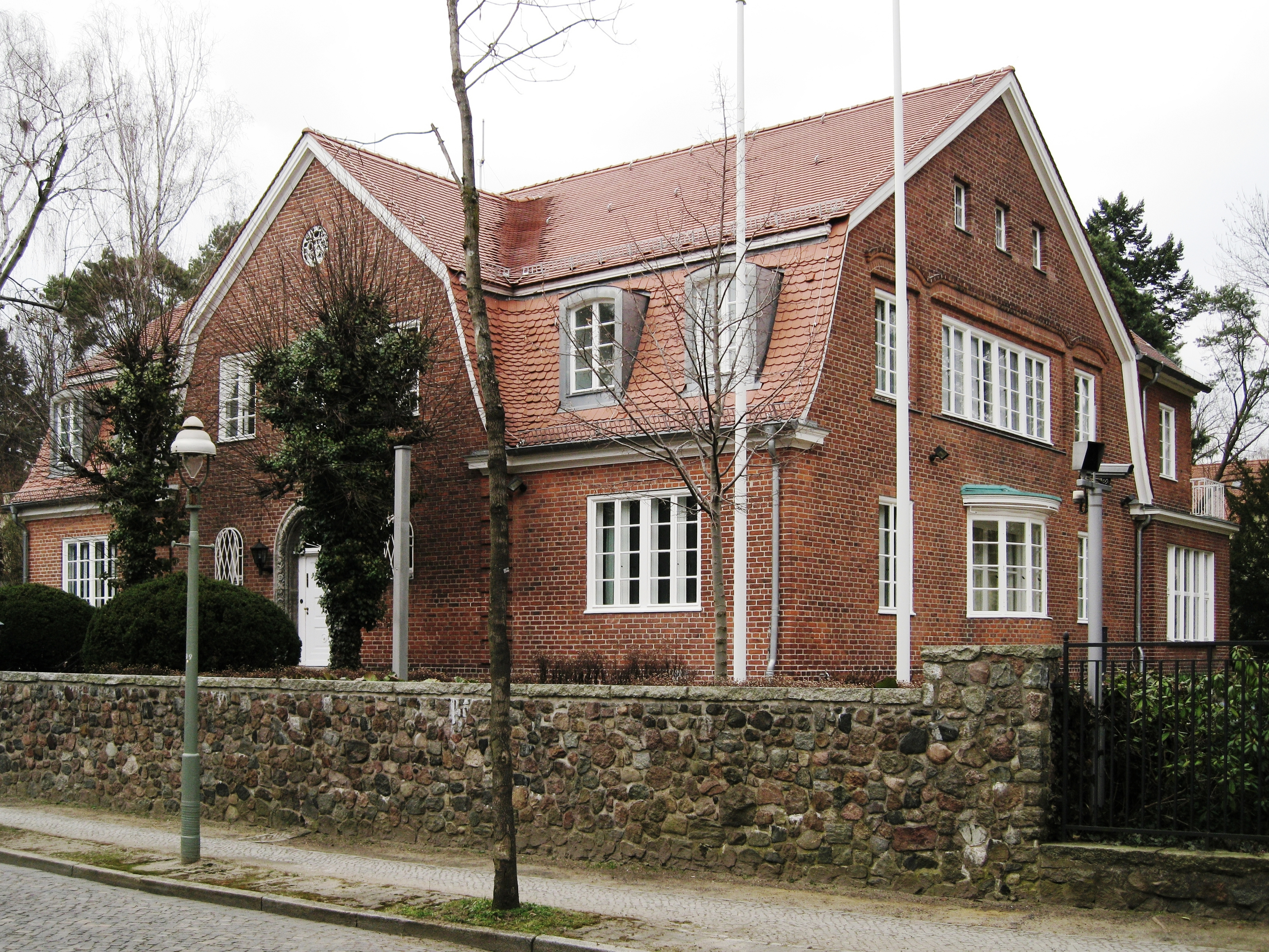
Cottage of the Ahrends family, built in 1911/12 in Berlin-Dahlem, his first self-contained project

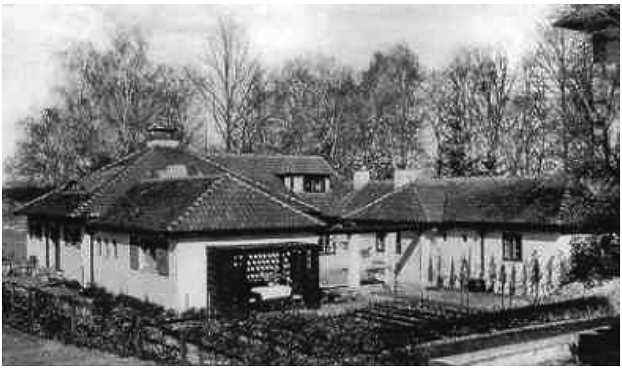
Second cottage of the Ahrends family, built between 1921 and 1925 at the shore of Großer Wannsee in Berlin-Zehlendorf

Ahrends left civil services to establish himself as an architect in Germany's capital, where the design of housing estates and single homes was a prosperous and prestigious business. In 1911-12, his first self-contained project was his own family's home, a cottage in the borough Dahlem, today used as the villa of the President of the German parliament. He even planned its ample backyard, which was sited in 1914. In 1917, he sold the cottage to a Berlin banker. After World War II it was used for the US legate in West-Berlin until 1991. Since about 1996, it has been the service villa of the President of the German parliament Bundestag. Different from that, between 1999 and 2004, the estate was used by the President of Germany, Johannes Rau and his family.

Between 1921 and 1925, Ahrends built a new unostentatious cottage for his family. It was located at Großer Wannsee, on the estate of his father, close to Villa Arons. Later, he planned and built numerous residential buildings and housing developments in several boroughs of Germany's capital, Berlin. His architectural style went from a traditional cottage style to a very modern style at that time. Between 1927 and 1928, he planned a building in Berlin-Wannsee, which was used by his friend Hans Krüger (1884–1945), a president in the Prussian ministry of agriculture, preserves and forestry. The cubic home was residence of the President of Germany, Heinrich Lübke, during his stays in West-Berlin between 1959 and 1969.

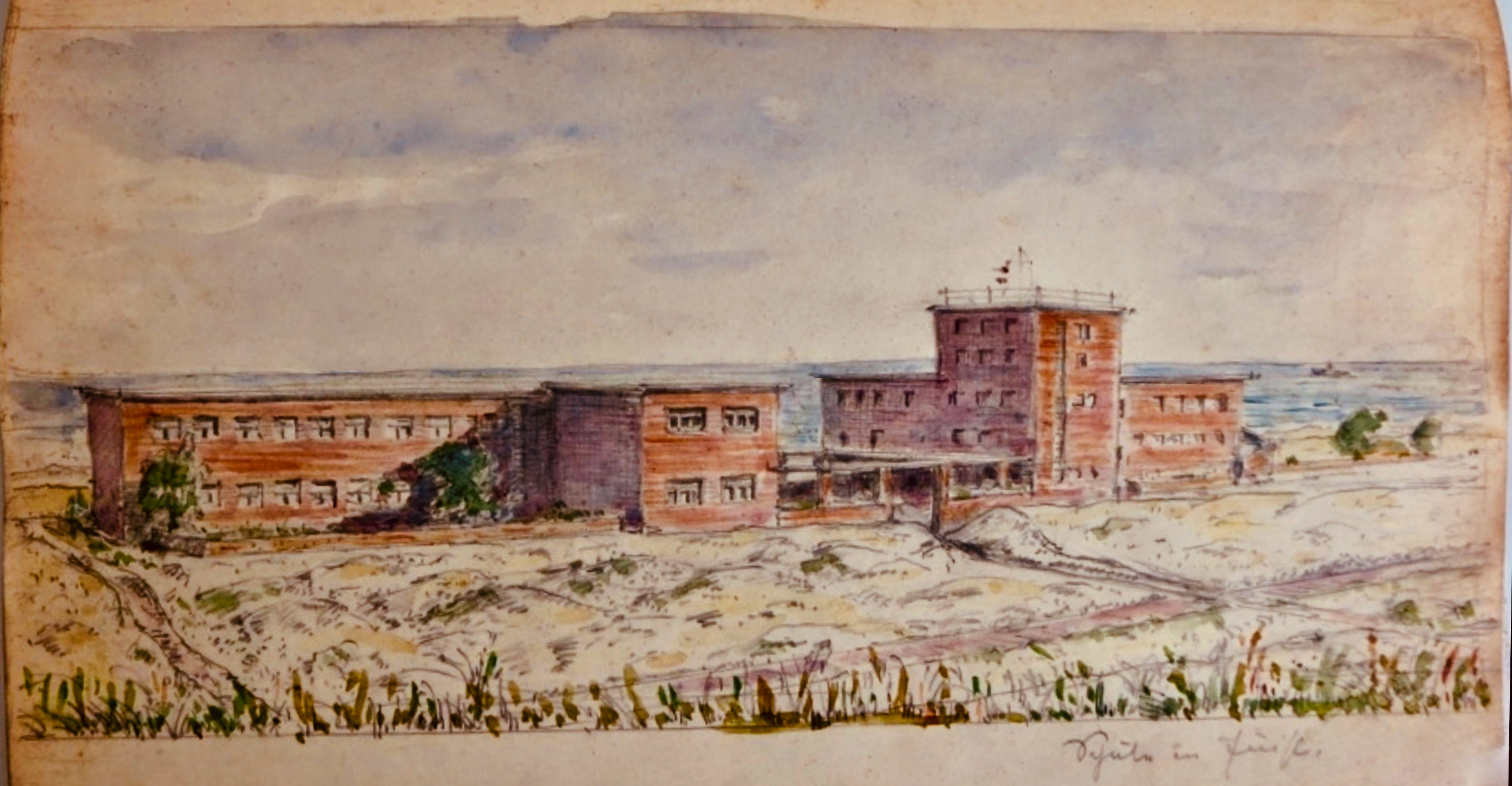
1929: Draft for a complex including a multifunctional theatre hall (the building adjacent to the square tower) of the progressive Schule am Meer on the German island Juist

Between 1929 and 1931, Ahrends planned and built a multifunctional hall on the German island Juist for the progressive boarding school Schule am Meer (School by the Sea). In the German Reich, it was the sole theatre hall of any school. With reference to William Shakespeare's role play, its stage was open to all sides and no longer separated from the auditorium. Martin Luserke, the school's founder and principal, used it for amateur play of his students, which was recognised across the country and also the predecessor of today's school role play. The school's theatre hall was also meant as a nationwide training post for role-play teachers.

Ahrends was able to work until 1935, when the Nazi government ordered a general professional disqualification through Berufsverbot for Jews and others. In 1936, he flew to Italy. From there, he made it to Britain in 1939, where he lived without a job in poor conditions. As an enemy alien, he was detained at Hutchinson Internment Camp on the Isle of Man, where he produced stencil prints of his surroundings as well as architectural drafts for a replacement of the whole location at Hutchinson Square. After World War II he emigrated to South Africa, where his two sons were living. He died soon after his arrival.

== Style ==
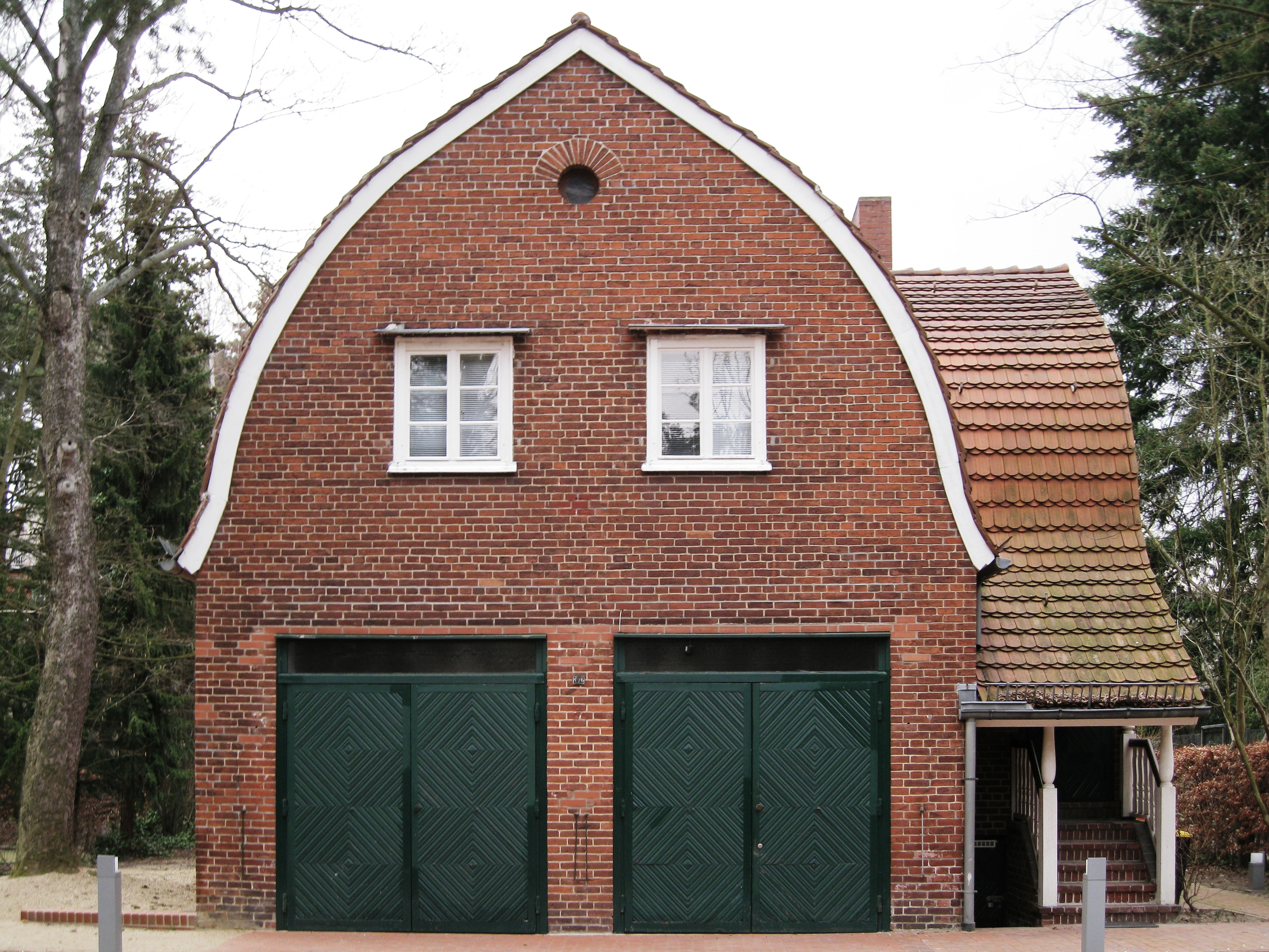
Chauffeur home with double garage of 1921/22, as extension of his first self-contained project for its subsequent owner

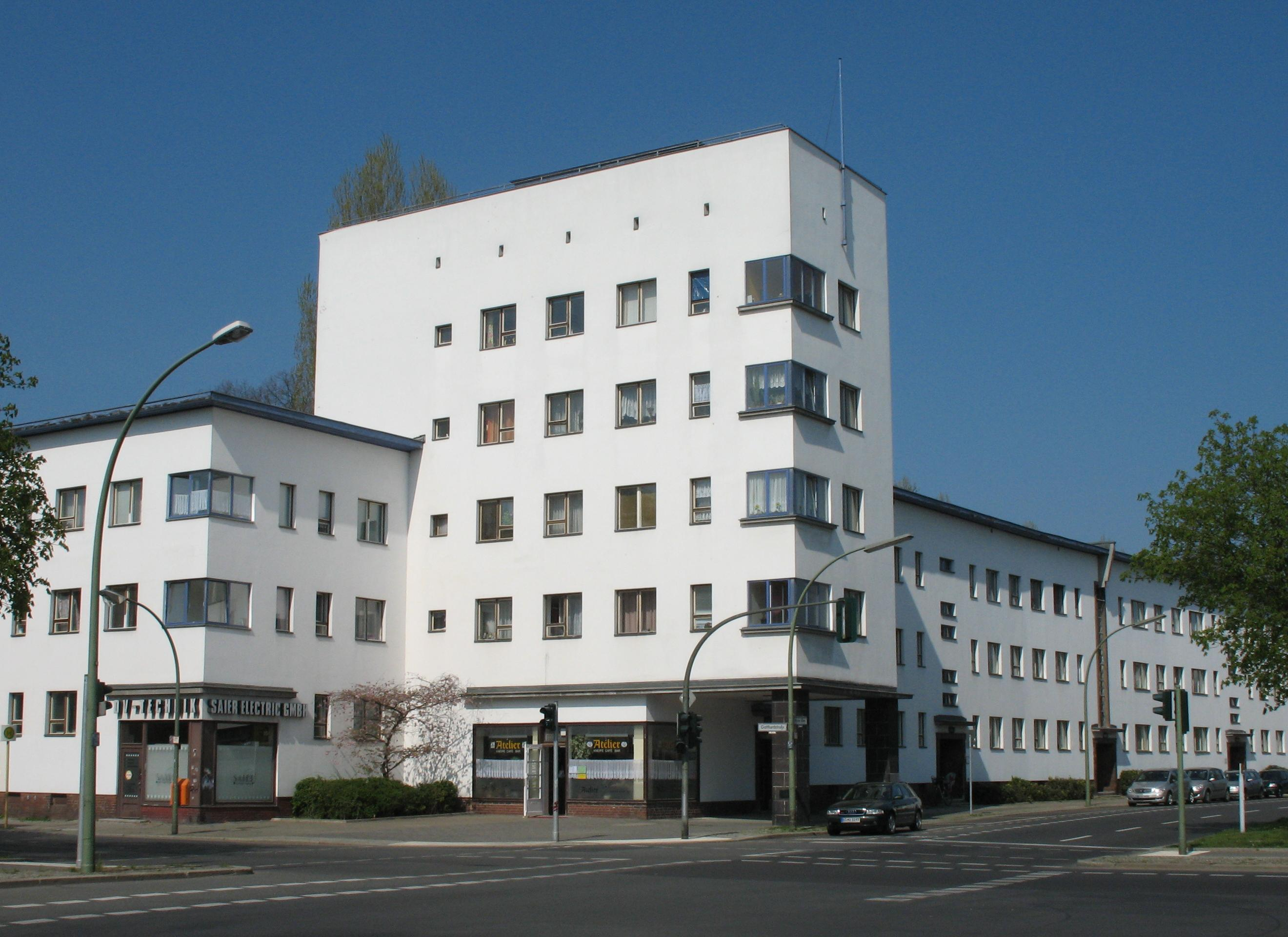
1929–31: Weisse Stadt – a prominent example of Berlin Modernism Housing Estates in the borough Reinickendorf (see external weblink)

Ahrends' drafts were focused on the requirements of the later homeowners. His architectural style changed significantly between 1911 and the 1930s. He started with a cottage style which reminded of buildings in Northern Germany and the Netherlands. Later, his formerly expressionist style with ornaments was reduced more and more. He decided on flat roofs and cubes, strung several cubes together or staggered them one after the other. In general, the flat roofs were a point of disgust at the beginning of the 1920s. Cubic buildings with flat roofs were depreciatively called a cigar box fashion by citizens. It led to discussions where Ahrends stood up for this architectural aesthetics. He got prominent support by Berlin's mayor and the central expert advisory board. While most of his buildings are under Cultural heritage management today, his housing estate as part of Weisse Stadt in Berlin-Reinickendorf is a World Heritage Site.

== Bibliography ==
- Norbert Huse (Hrsg.): Siedlungen der zwanziger Jahre heute. Vier Berliner Großsiedlungen 1924–1984. Publica, Berlin 1984. ISBN 978-3-89087-012-0. (German)
- Architekturwerkstatt Helge Pitz – Winfried Brenne (Hrsg.): „Weisse Stadt“ in Reinickendorf. Berlin, 1981. (Dokumentation der 50jährigen Geschichte, Erarbeitung des Originalzustandes sowie der Grundlagen für zukünftige Maßnahmen dieser unter Denkmalschutz stehenden Siedlung aus den Jahren 1929/31.) (German)
- Harry Balkow-Gölitzer / Bettina Biedermann / Rüdiger Reitmeier: Eine noble Adresse. Prominente in Berlin-Dahlem und ihre Geschichten, Bebra, Berlin 2005, ISBN 978-3814801360. (German)
