= Heinrich Karl Ernst Martin Meyer =

German-American professor and Nazi sympathizer (1904–1977)

Heinrich Meyer
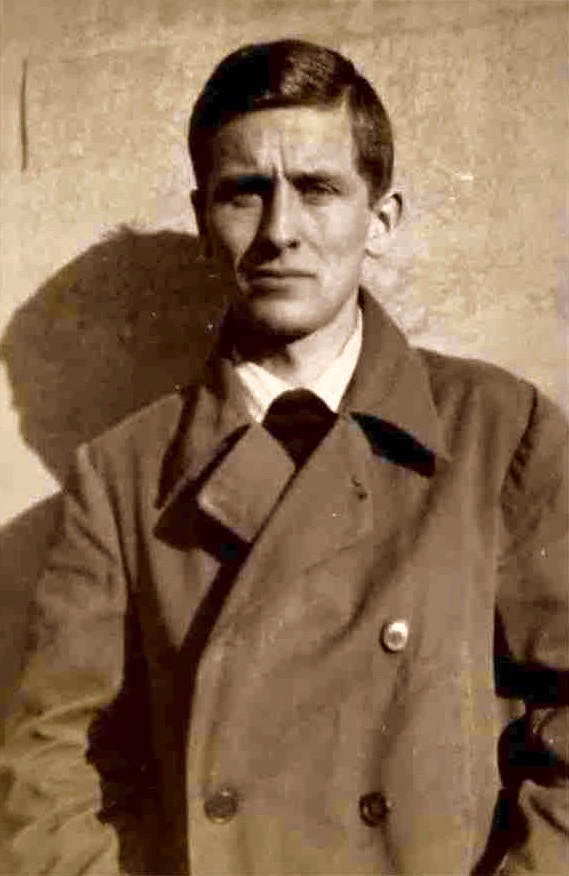
- Meyer as a teacher at the Schule am Meer on Juist, 1929
- Born: 17 May 1904; Nuremberg, German Empire
- Died: 10 October 1977 (aged 73); Bellingham, Washington, United States
- Other names: John Anderson; Robert O. Barlow; Hugo Cartesius; H. K. Houston Meyer
- Citizenship: Germany; United States (from 1935)
- Occupations: Professor, writer
- Employer: Rice University
- Known for: Support for Nazi programs, attempt by the United States to revoke citizenship
- Spouses: Mary Louise Dinsmoor (m. 1936; div. 1942); Doris Hoag Clark (m. 1945; div. 1955); Sibylle Hommel (m. 1957)

Heinrich Karl Ernst Martin Meyer (17 May 1904 – 10 October 1977) was a German-American professor, writer, and Nazi sympathizer. He first moved to the United States to work at Rice University in 1930 and became a naturalized citizen on 6 November 1935. In 1942, a petition was submitted to revoke his citizenship due to his sympathies for the Nazi Germany, and the case was fought in courts until he was ultimately allowed to retain his American citizenship in 1944.

Over the next three decades, Meyer wrote extensively about German literature and about American culture, but also published on gardening under pseudonym John Anderson, Robert O. Barlow, Hugo Cartesius, and H. K. Houston Meyer. His papers are held in the Jean and Alexander Heard Library Special Collections at Vanderbilt University.

== Early life ==
Meyer was born to Wilhelm Meyer, a school teacher, and his wife, Anna. He first enrolled at the university in Erlangen in 1923. In the same year, he transferred to the Ludwig-Maximilians-Universität München. From 1924 to 1928, Meyer studied in Freiburg, where he received his doctorate in German Literature. After teaching at Martin Luserke's Schule am Meer ('School by the Sea') for two years, he then moved to Houston, Texas, where he lived for thirteen years as a German instructor at Rice Institute (now Rice University). In 1935, Meyer applied for and received American citizenship. On 10 May 1936, he married Mary Louise Dinsmoor whom he had met at Rice Institute. They divorced on 19 December 1942. On 19 February 1945, he married Doris Hoag Clark (born 1923). The two divorced in 1955. In 1957, he married his third wife, Sibylle Hommel (born 1932).

== Citizenship trial ==
Meyer took two trips to Germany shortly after naturalizing, in 1936 and again in 1938. A request he made for an audience with Adolf Hitler in 1938 was denied. Nevertheless, Meyer defended many practices in Nazi Germany to his American audiences by comparing them to Jim Crow laws in the American South. His German nationality brought him under suspicion of the FBI, who began to investigate his work. In September 1942, a petition to revoke Meyer's citizenship was filed in Houston and Meyer had to serve as his own defense until attorneys Garvey W. Brown and William Hatten were hired for his case.

On 8 March 1943, Meyer was taken into custody by federal authorities. He spent the next three months at an internment camp in Kenedy, Texas.

== Awards and prizes ==
- Award of Kant Society in Germany (1930)
- John Simon Guggenheim Fellowship (1953)
- Order of Merit of the Federal Republic of Germany (1972)

== Publications ==
- Der deutsche Schäferroman (1928)
- Konrad Bäumlers weiter Weg: Ein Texas-deutscher Roman (1938) (as H.K. Houston Meyer)
- Goethe. Das Leben im Werk (1950 and 1952)
- The Age of the World: A Chapter in the History of the Enlightenment (1951)
- Was bleibt. Bemerkungen über Literatur und Leben, Schein und Wirklichkeit. (1966)
- Die Kunst des Erzählens (1972)
