= Zuckmayer =

Zuckmayer is a German surname. Notable people with the surname include:

- Carl Zuckmayer (1896–1977), German writer and playwright
- Eduard Zuckmayer (1890–1972), German pedagogue, composer, conductor, and pianist
