= Carl Geist =

German Impressionist painter

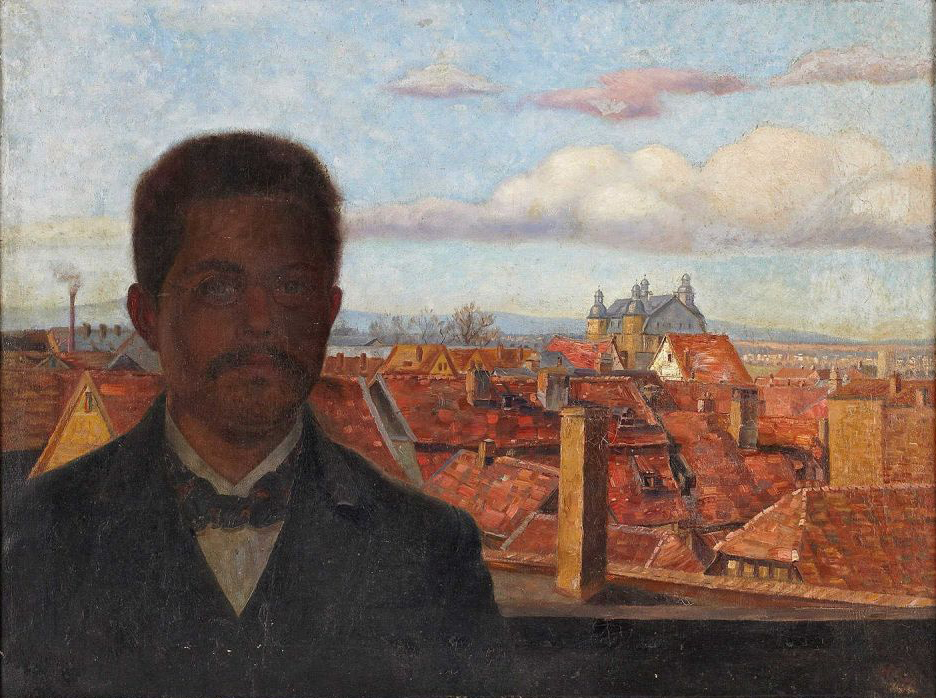
Self-portrait with Veduta of Offenbach (1906)

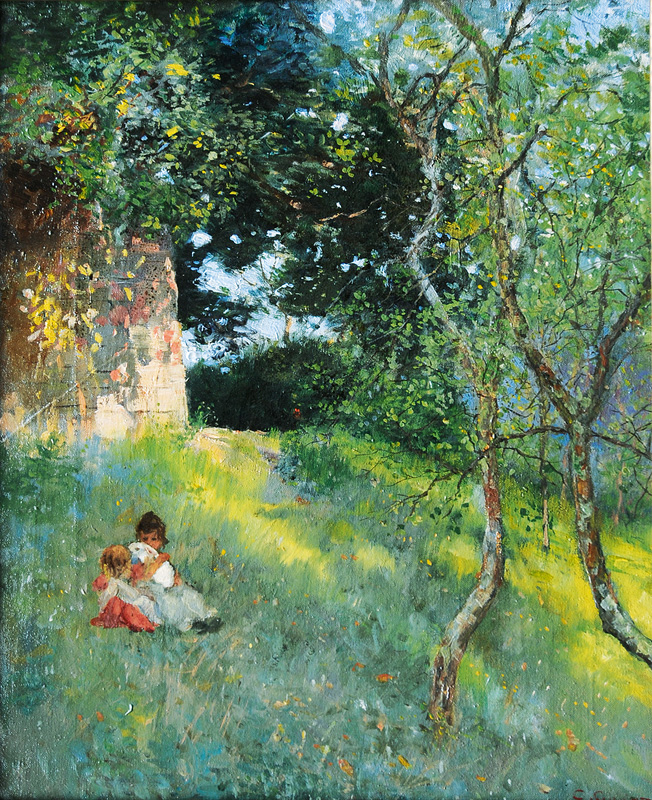
Children with Rabbits in the Garden (before 1915)

Carl Friedrich Wilhelm Geist (9 December 1870, Reichelsheim – 29 November 1931, Bad Wimpfen) was a German Impressionist painter.

== Life ==
His father was the district veterinarian. In 1871, his family moved to Grünberg and he attended the Gymnasium in Laubach. In 1888, he entered the Academy of Fine Arts, Karlsruhe, where he studied under Ferdinand Keller. With a scholarship from the Grand Ducal Ministry of the Interior, he undertook further studies in Munich, Vienna and Italy.

In 1900, he exhibited at the Glaspalast. Although he was officially enrolled at Karlsruhe until 1905, he actually pursued his studies with Robert von Haug in Stuttgart. He briefly lived in Darmstadt, then returned to Grünberg in 1905 although, as a free-lance painter, he travelled frequently to visit his clients. After 1915 he lived in Wimpfen.

World War I hit him very hard, especially the loss of friends such as August Macke and Franz Marc. In response, he abandoned impressionism for a gloomier Academic style and his output decreased dramatically.

The Carl-Geist-Straße in Grünberg is named after him.
