= Landheim Schondorf =

Boarding school in Schondorf am Ammersee, Germany

Coordinates: 48°3′18″N 11°5′52″E

Location
- Stiftung Landheim Schondorf, Landheim 1 Schondorf am Ammersee; Germany

Information
- School type: Gymnasium, Elementary school
- Founded: 1905
- Head of the foundation: Rüdiger Häusler
- Grades: 1–12
- Enrollment: max. 300
- Website: www.landheim-schondorf.de

Landheim Schondorf is a boarding school located in Schondorf am Ammersee with two separate upper schools and a lower school. The campus includes 27 buildings and a private dock on the Ammersee. The school’s motto is “Learning with Mind, Heart and Hand,” with each part representing a different type of learning: the “Mind” represents academic learning, the “Heart” an education in social skills and a sense of community, and the “Hand” a development of artisanal, musical, artistic and athletic skills.

== History ==
The boarding school was founded by Julius Lohmann in 1905 as a “home of learning” in a rural setting. Initially, only male students were allowed to attend. In 1929, husband and wife Ernst and Julie Reisinger turned the school into a foundation. The couple developed the basic structure of the school by assigning teachers the additional roles of houseparents, mentors, and workshop leaders; a structure that is still used to this day. Nowadays both male and female students are accepted and educated in a holistic, pedagogical approach with modern teaching methods, thus preparing them for the future.

== School profile ==
Landheim Schondorf is made up of different types of schools: the state-accredited Ernst-Reisinger-Gymnasium (upper school), the state-approved Julius-Lohmann-School, and an elementary school. Beginning in the eighth year, students choose between two branches: languages or economics. Landheim has a maximum enrollment capacity of 300 students and draws in applications from all of Germany as well as many foreign countries. Education in Landheim’s secondary schools is supplemented by mandatory participation in craft (including locksmithing, carpentry, gardening, cooking, photography workshop, and more), athletic (e.g. sailing, rowing, hockey, basketball, tennis, horseback riding and rock climbing) and musical projects (e.g. choir, band, and theater). In order to enable students of all backgrounds to attend, Landheim offers several merit-based and need-based scholarships.

=== Foreign language track ===
In their fifth year, all students begin taking English as their first foreign language. In their sixth year, students must choose either French or Latin for their second foreign language. Once in their eighth year, students in the languages branch choose between Spanish and French for their third language, while students in the economics branch take “Economics and Law.” Additionally, students may choose to take Chinese as an elective.

=== Student exchange programs ===
Landheim participates in student exchange programs with partner schools in Japan, the USA, Canada, India, Australia, Great Britain, Switzerland, Georgia, Albania and France. There are additional exchange possibilities with members of the international school association, Round Square.

=== Day students ===
In addition to the boarding students, Landheim also enrolls day students from Schondorf and other neighboring towns and cities.

== Degrees ==
Upon completion of upper school, students may receive the Abitur, enabling them to continue their studies at the university level.

== Partnerships ==
As of 2008, Landheim Schondorf is a member of the global school network, Round Square.

== Notable alumni ==
- Steffen Ahrends (1907–1992), architect
- Christoph Probst (1919–1943), member of the resistance group Weisse Rose
- Helmuth James Graf von Moltke (1907–1945), attorney and resistance fighter
- Fritz-Rudolf Schultz (1917–2002), politician
- Kontra K (1987), Rapper
