= Alfred Mann (musicologist) =

American musicologist (1917–2006)

- Born: April 28, 1917; Hamburg
- Died: September 21, 2006 (aged 89); Fort Wayne, Indiana
- Education: Berlin Academy of Music
- Occupations: Musicologist, writer
- Known for: Translation of Gradus ad Parnassum by Johann Fux

Notes
- Alfred Mann had to flee Germany because of the Nazis before World War II.

Alfred Mann (April 28, 1917 – September 21, 2006), was an American musicologist who specialized in the history of Western musical theory. He was a professor of Musicology at the Eastman School of Music, University of Rochester. His parents were the portrait painter Wilhelm Mann and the well-known harpsichordist and musicologist Edith Weiss-Mann.

== Biography ==
Alfred Mann left Germany before World War II and moved to Italy where he could only stay shortly. In 1938, Mann had to leave Italy, because of a Mussolini mandate, and Mann moved to the USA. After a long career, Mann became Professor of Musicology at the Eastman School in 1980, retiring and becoming Professor Emeritus in 1987.

== Important Writings ==
In 1938, Mann published his German translation of Johann Joseph Fux's Gradus ad Parnassum next to the first one by Lorenz Christoph Mizler in 1742.

In 1943, Mann made the first real translation of Gradus ad Parnassum into English next to the one with paraphrases by an anonymous translator. The translation contained the preface, pages 41 – 139 and page 279 of the original work, based on his German translation version.

In 1958, Mann translated into English, the part of Gradus ad Parnassum that concerned the composition of a fugue, pages 140 – 217 of the original work.
