= Edith Weiss-Mann =

German music educator and pianist (1885-1951)

Edith Weiss-Mann (11 May 1885 – 18 May 1951) was a German harpsichordist, musicologist and teacher.

== Life ==
Edith Weiss-Mann was born in Hamburg to businessman Emil Weiss and his wife Hermine Rosenfeld Weiss. She studied at Hamburg's Hochschule für Musik from 1900 to 1904. In 1905, she continued her studies privately with James Kwast, Carl Friedberg, Jose Vianna da Motta and Bruno Eisner. After meeting harpsichordist Wanda Landowska, Weiss-Mann began to concentrate on the harpsichord and early music.

In 1910, Weiss-Mann married the portrait painter Wilhelm Mann. Although the marriage did not last, the couple had a son (Alfred Mann) in 1917, who became a well-known musicologist.

In 1925 Weiss-Mann helped found the Vereinigung zur Pflege alter Musik (Society for the Revival of Ancient Music). With conductor Fritz Stein, she established the group's chamber ensemble and revived interest in early music in Germany. Weiss-Mann appeared as a harpsichord soloist with conductor Wilhelm Furtwängler and collaborated with composers Paul Hindemith and Heinrich Kaminski. During this time, her students included Ingolf Dahl and Felicitas Kukuck. She also worked as a music critic for the Frankfurter Zeitung, the Deutsche Allgemeine Zeitung Berlin, and the New York Music Courier.

== Immigration ==
Since she was of Jewish origin, Weiss-Mann had to give up her teaching jobs in Germany after 1933. Because of this, she immigrated to New York City in 1939. There, she performed with conductor Otto Klemperer in 1940 and played harpsichord on the first American recording of Vivaldi's The Four Seasons in 1947. She was the first harpsichordist in America to perform all of Bach's clavier concerti in a single series of concerts. She recorded works by Telemann, Johann Christoph Pepusch, and Scarlatti for two versions of an LP released by Westminster: XWN 18589 and WL 5214. She also recorded for Hargail Recorder Music, usually as a harpsichord accompanist.

In a review of Weiss-Mann's solo harpsichord debut in New York on 9 May 1949, The New York Times wrote,

"It was good to hear her in a whole program of her own. She is an excellent artist, and after collaborating so self-effacingly with others—often playing only the continuo—she deserved the spotlight. … The way Mme. Weiss-Mann sat at the black and gold harpsichord, her hands moving over the two keyboards as swiftly as dragonflies, one would have thought it easy to play with such accuracy. For she has the assurance that comes from thorough mastery of the instrument. Because of her technical skill, it was easy to lose sight of it in concentrating on the quality of her interpretations. But one couldn’t help admiring the way she achieved subtle variations of color without faltering in the firmness and resilience of her rhythms."

Towards the end of her life, Weiss-Mann taught at Rutgers University. McGinnis and Marx published her figured bass realizations for Six Sonatas for Bassoon or Cello and Piano by Ernst Galliard. G. Schirmer Inc. published her arrangement of The Bashful Thames for solo tenor and three recorders.
