= Schule am Meer =

Boarding school in the Weimar Republic

Coordinates: 53°40′32″N 6°57′47″E

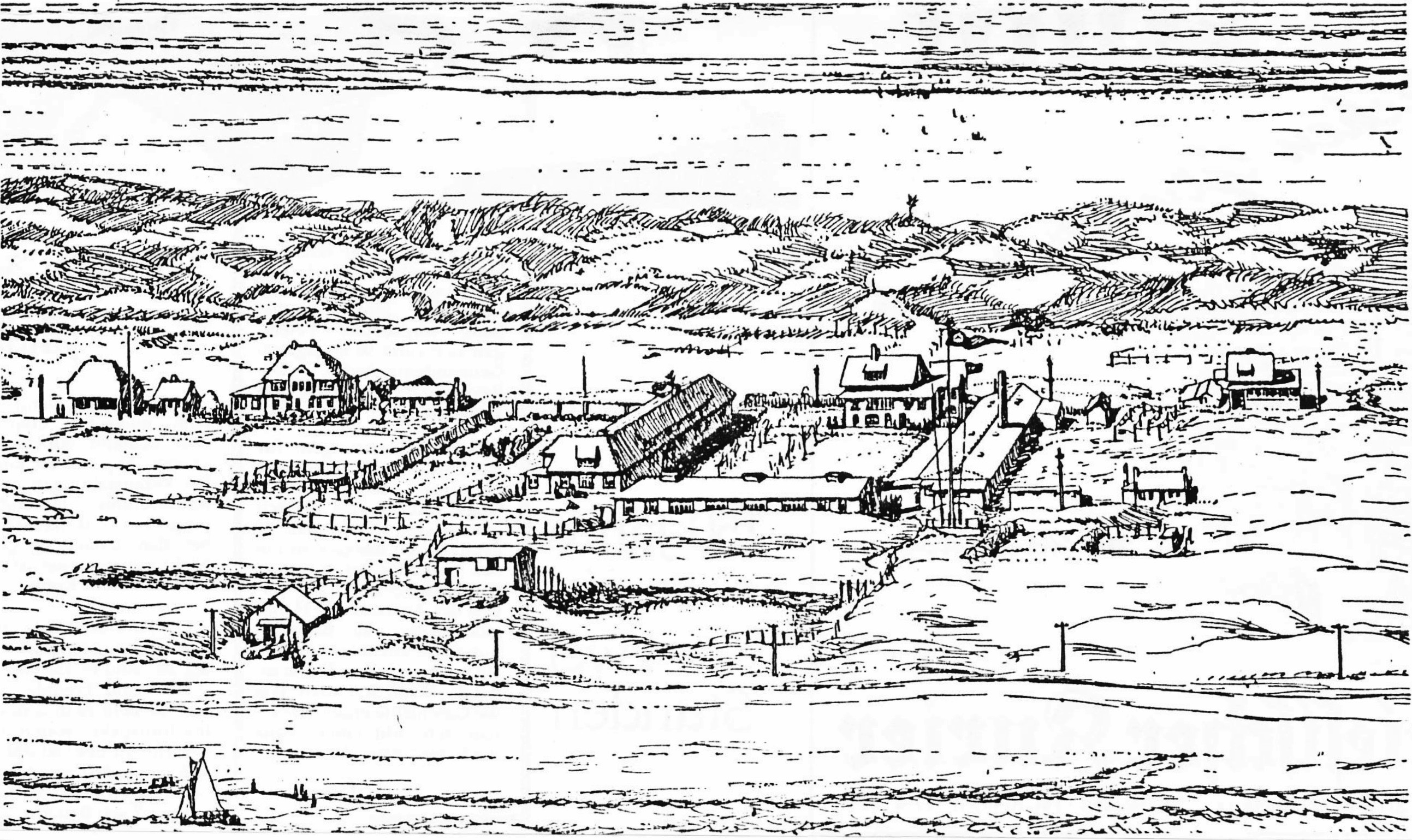
Drawing of boarding school Schule am Meer on the East Frisian island of Juist, bird's eye view from Wadden Sea northbound, summer 1928.

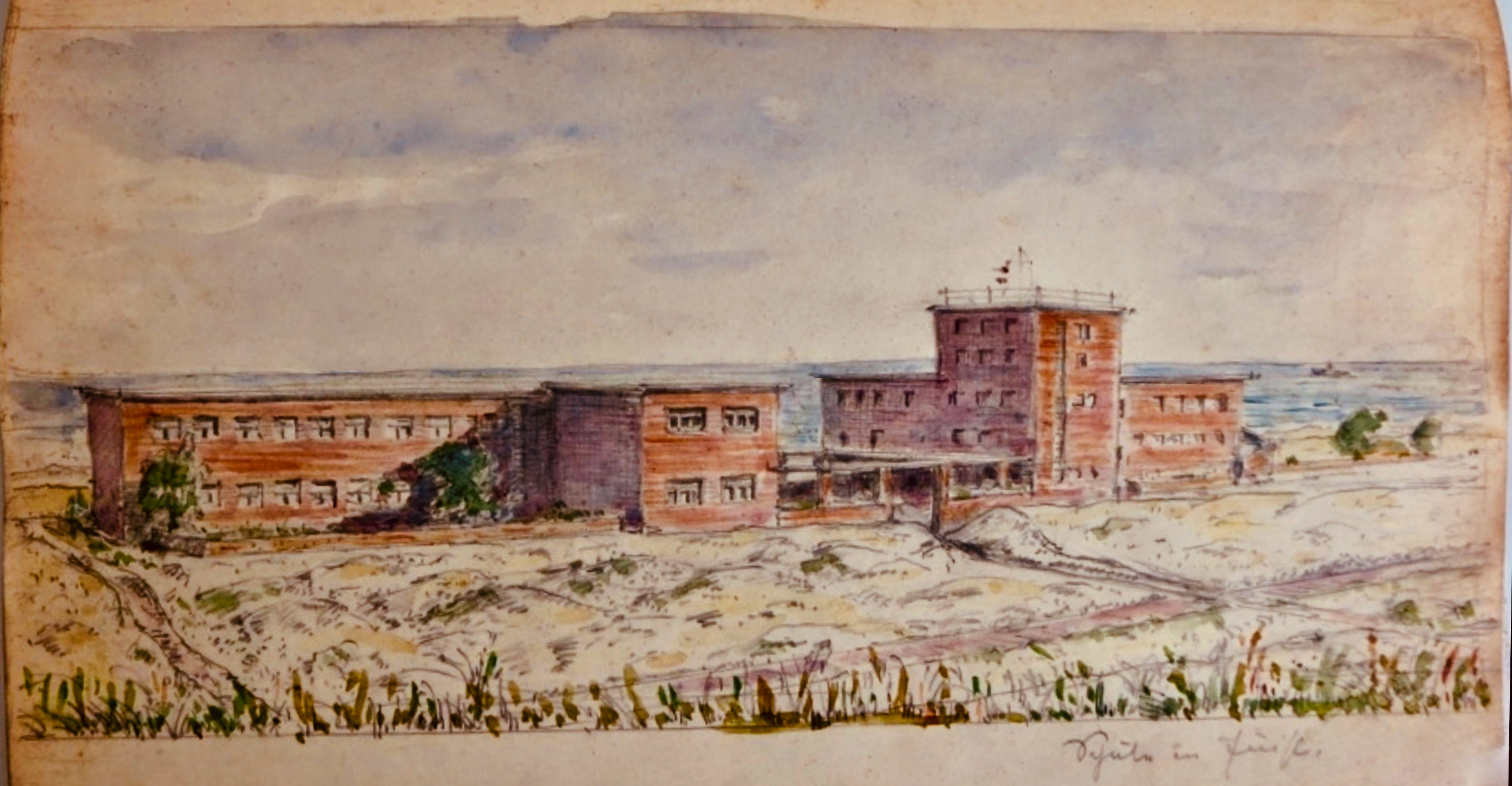
Stage hall complex of Schule am Meer as projected in 1929, its stage hall erected in 1930/31, watercolor painting by architect Bruno Ahrends.

4-sided flyer (click picture to view all four pages), published by Schule am Meer, 1931.

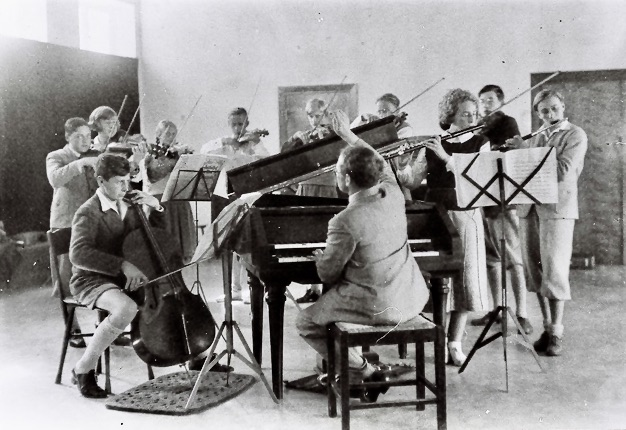
Eduard Zuckmayer directs some members of the boarding school's orchestra from his harpsichord, 1931.

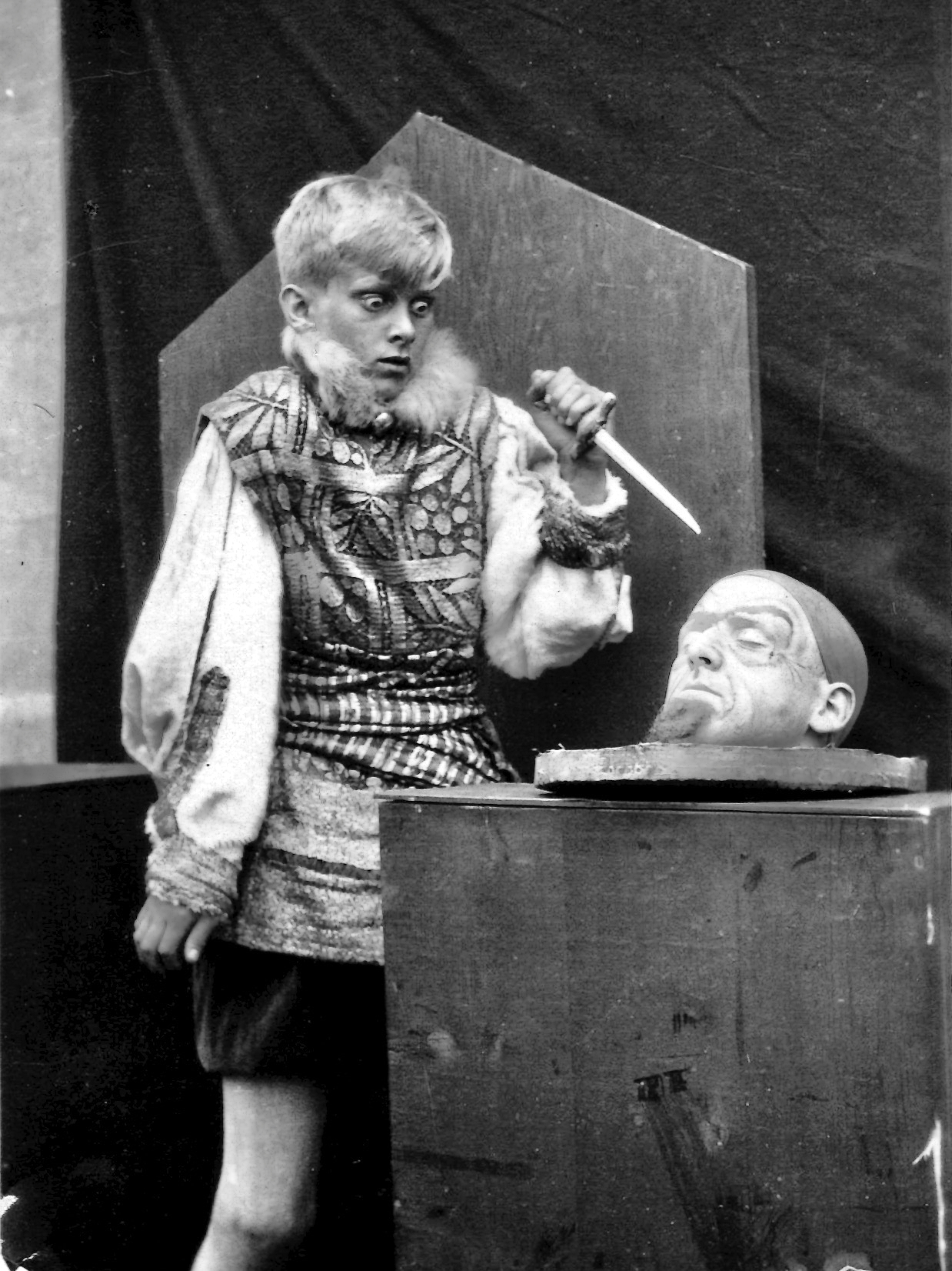
Play on stage, 1931.

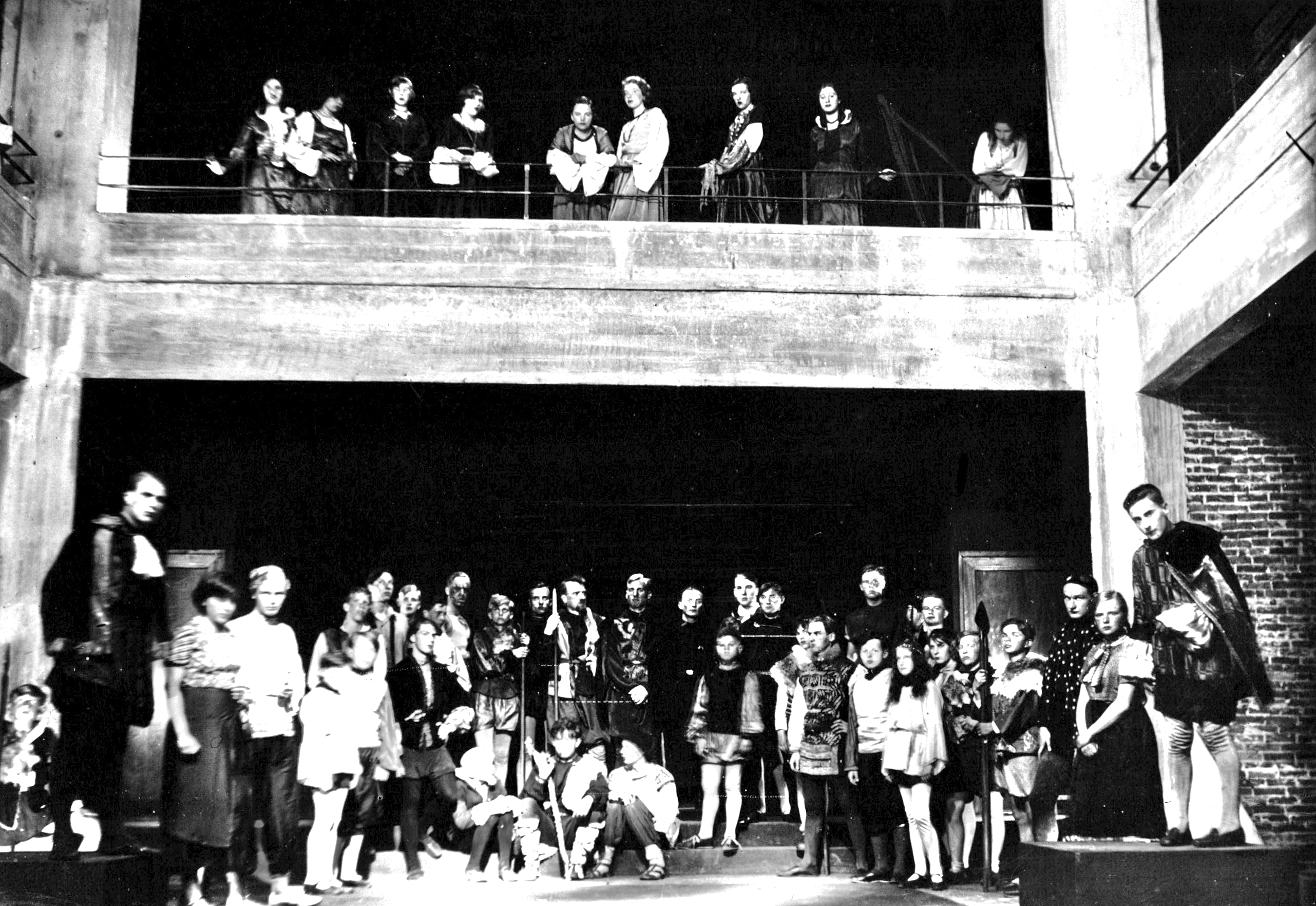
Students and teachers costumed in the stage hall of S.a.M., newly erected by renowned Berlin-based architect Bruno Ahrends, 1931.

Schule am Meer (Hebrew: בית ספר ליד הים, lit. 'School by the Sea'), also known as S.a.M. or SaM, was a private boarding school on the East Frisian island of Juist in the Free State of Prussia of the Weimar Republic, located between Wadden Sea and North Sea. The school was co-educational and combined elements of holistic and progressive education.

== Operation and key people ==
The boarding school was operated by Stiftung Schule am Meer, a private foundation whose board of trustees consisted of the Swiss educator Rudolf Aeschlimann (1884–1961), the Austrian painter Fritz Hafner, the German industrialist, art collector and patron of the arts Alfred Hess from Erfurt in Thuringia, the progressive educator Martin Luserke from Berlin, the social scientist Elisabeth Jaffé, née Freiin von Richthofen originating from Lorraine, and the chemist Paul Reiner (1886–1932) from Nuremberg in Franconia. Aeschlimann, Hafner, Luserke and Reiner were active teachers at S.a.M. and among the school's founders. The foundation got co-financed by the Prussian state. Still most funds had to be brought up by the board of trustees, by the student's parents via tuition payments, by monetary donations or contributions in kind. Most musical instruments of the boarding school got donated by Robert Wichard Pohl, a Steinway grand piano was donated by Paul Reiner's wife Anna Sara Reiner (1891–1972), née Hochschild, a qualified nurse helper who also acted as a substitute teacher for the elementary/primary and the intermediate/lower secondary level.

== Historical significance ==
Schule am Meer was the first progressive school in Germany to be set up on an island in the sea. It is considered the first regular German open air school, which from grade 5 to grade 13 led to graduation (Reifeprüfung, Abitur). Due to its open air status, in some cases it was chosen by parents of children and youth with health issues like bronchial asthma, which for instance affected the Austrian mountaineer and S.a.M. student Ulrich Sild (1911–1937) from Vienna who graduated at Schule am Meer in March 1931.

It was the only German school that built its own free-standing theatre hall in 1930/31, right during Great Depression, which was also intended to train amateur play teachers throughout German Reich. This and the remaining other large building Arche (= Ark) of the former school today are due to demolition.

== Curriculum ==
In contrast to most state-run schools, it placed a special emphasis on training its students in the visual and performing arts, sports, crafts and gardening. It also considered scientific, artistic and sporting subjects as of equal value.

A second offshoot from Wickersdorf [Free School Community of Wickersdorf, Thuringia] is Luserke's Schule am Meer, another Free School Community, established some five years ago on the low-lying sandy island of Juist in the North Sea just opposite Bremen's harbor. The founder and leader of the school, Martin Luserke, is especially distinguished for his work and his writings in the juvenile drama. In the simplest of settings and with sincere artistry he leads his pupils to lose themselves or find themselves in the spirit of a play and to give their own interpretation of a character or a mood. But his school is more than a children's theater. It is also a place for hard duty and practical work. Boys and girls must be of Spartan mold to face the austerity of life in the "School by the Sea," [sic] where every member of the community labors at his share of necessary chores even when winter storms sweep the surrounding ocean and threaten the security of the island dwellers. Perhaps it is their very intimacy with primitive forces which makes it easier for Luserke's pupils to present dramas of vitality and simple beauty. Although Luserke is a product of the Youth Movement, he is not one of the extremists who encourage youth to create its own cultural forms without reference to classical traditions. Sometimes his pupils write their own dramas, occasionally he writes a play for them, but more often they turn to folk festivals, old mystery plays, to short pieces by Hans Sachs, or to the dramas of Schiller, Lessing, Goethe, and Shakespeare, when they plan a production for their theater. Luserke emphasizes creative acting rather than original writing. Within the limitations of the school theater he sees rich opportunities for children and young people to discover the essential beauty of dramatic masterpieces and to unfold their own emotions and abilities in re-living human experiences from other times and places. Music, the dance, and the arts of color, form, and design, all contribute to the beauty of the plays Luserke presents, but never does he forget that it is the human voice and figure which are the soul of the drama. At the Schule am Meer all plays are innocent of theatricalism and untouched by the cheap effects of a commercialized stage.

— Richard Thomas Alexander/Beryl Parker, 1929

== Boarding ==
The boarding school existed from the beginning of May 1925 to the end of March 1934 and quickly developed some national reputation, among others by its orchestra and choir, both founded and conducted by the most talented concert pianist, composer and music educator Eduard Zuckmayer, but most notably by its stage play.

== External support ==
It got support by senior guest students and teachers from England, France and the United States, especially for language classes and stage plays, the latter performed in German, English and French.

Despite being competitors there was also some support among the progressive schools throughout German Reich, a temporary exchange of students and teachers as well as visits of senior classes for topical discussions like from Karl-Marx-Schule (Berlin-Neukölln), led by progressive educator Fritz Karsen (1885–1951), née as Fritz Krakauer. Among other visitors had been progressive Protestant educator Bernhard Hell (1877–1955) with his students.

== Democratic tendencies ==
Schule am Meer was practicing "grassroots democracy" with a tendency to non-hierarchical structures. Students and teachers were considered as of equal rights and duties. Students actively helped shape the lessons. All individuals of the Schulgemeinde (= school community), which acted as the boarding school's "legislative council" participated in a shared decision-making process. Comradeships, the subdivisions of the community were formed out of about ten students of different age and sex, not related to classes in any way. As a leader of each comradeship, a teacher was characterized as "primus inter pares" and got addressed either by first name or nickname, the latter sometimes an abbreviation or a cacography of the teacher's surname. Those comradeships were named as Bears, Bulls, Dolphins, Foals, Seals, Penguins, Pinnipeds, Vultures and Wolves, created their logos and raised their own pennants. The comradeships turned out similar to a family-like structure, out of which most life-lasting friendships between many of the students and teachers emerged.

== Closure ==
The boarding school was closed due to Nazi "Gleichschaltung" and state-run anti-Semitism, forcibly carried out by the islanders of Juist who already denounced the boarding school as Jewish since its foundation in 1925. Several of the students and their parents as well as some teachers had to emigrate from Nazi Germany due to political or anti-Semitic prosecution. They went to North and South America, South Africa, Mandatory Palestine, Spain, France, England, Switzerland and other places, where several of them were able to make an encyclopedically relevant career in the industry, in sciences, in the arts, in photography or in journalism. All of them spread the word and shared their memories about a unique boarding school on a remote island in the sea.

== Related people (selection) ==
The following list is focussing on those related people who got a biography at the English Wikipedia, so it is no representative cross section, but already containing major names.

- Bruno Ahrends (1878–1948), architect and S.a.M. parent
- Klaus Philipp Bamberger (1920–2008), S.a.M. student
- Max Bondy (1892–1951), progressive educator, S.a.M. parent, founder of German, Swiss and US boarding schools, see Windsor Mountain School
- Gerhard Bry (1911–1996), S.a.M. graduate
- Eugen Diederichs (1867–1930), publisher, S.a.M. sponsor
- Dr. Alfred Döblin, MD (1878–1957), psychologist, writer and S.a.M. parent
- Adolphe Ferrière (1879–1960), Swiss progressive educator
- Hans Freyer (1887–1969), sociologist, historian and philosopher
- Adolf Grimme (1889–1963), politician, Prussian Minister of Science, Art and Education, S.a.M. sponsor
- Fritz Hafner (1877–1969), S.a.M. teacher
- Heinz Friedrich Hartig (1907–1969), S.a.M. teacher
- Hans Hecht (1876–1946), linguist (English studies), Shakespeare expert, held lectures at S.a.M.
- Alfred Hess (1879–1931), industrialist, art collector, patron of the arts, S.a.M. parent, S.a.M. foundation board of trustees
- Hans Hess (1907–1975), S.a.M. student
- Dr. Elisabeth Jaffé (1874–1973), sociologist, S.a.M. foundation board of trustees
- Adolf Köster (1883–1930), German minister of the Exterior, German minister of the Interior, ambassador and S.a.M. parent
- Hedda Korsch (1890–1982), co-founder of the Communist Party of Germany (KPD), educationalist, who temporarily taught at S.a.M.
- Beate Köstlin (1919–2001), S.a.M. student
- Walter Georg Kühne (1911–1991), S.a.M. graduate
- Felicitas Kestner (1914–2001), S.a.M. student
- Ernst Kurth (1886–1946), Swiss music theorist
- Paula Ludwig, Austrian-German poet and S.a.M. parent
- Martin Luserke (1880–1968), S.a.M. headmaster, theatermaker, writer, bard
- Heinrich Meyer (1904–1977), S.a.M. teacher
- Rolf Pappiér (1914–1998), S.a.M. graduate
- Robert Wichard Pohl (1884–1976), physicist, S.a.M. sponsor
- Jørgen Skafte Rasmussen (1878–1964), Danish engineer, industrialist and S.a.M. parent
- Werner Rings (1910–1998), S.a.M. graduate
- Christian Rohlfs (1849–1938), expressionist painter and printmaker, S.a.M. sponsor
- Ludwig Roselius (1874–1943), coffee merchant, art collector and patron of the arts, S.a.M. sponsor
- Prof. Dr. Alfred Weber (1868–1958), economist, geographer, sociologist and theoretician of culture
- Carl Zuckmayer (1896–1977), writer and playwright, visited and cooperated temporarily with his older brother Eduard and Luserke at S.a.M.
- Eduard Zuckmayer (1890–1972), S.a.M. musician
