= Steffen Ahrends =

German architect

- Born: 16 August 1907; Berlin, Germany
- Died: 31 October 1992 (aged 85); Spain
- Education: Staatliches Bauhaus
- Occupation: Architect
- Children: Peter Ahrends
- Parent: Bruno Ahrends
- Buildings: University of the Witwatersrand Social Sciences Building

Steffen Ahrends (16 August 1907 – 31 October 1992) was an architect. His father, Bruno Ahrends, and son, Peter Ahrends (1933–2026), were also both architects.

Steffen Ahrends matriculated from Landheim Schondorf in Bavaria in 1924. Back in Berlin he studied for one year at the Technical Hochschule of Berlin and then proceeded to Staatliches Bauhaus in Weimar, Thuringia which he attended from 1925 to 1929. There he was studying under Otto Bartning and Ernst Neufert. After his state examination he married in 1930. Then he joined his father's architectural office in Berlin from 1930 to 1931. In 1931 he temporarily joined the Ernst May 'brigade' in Moscow but returned to his father's office in 1932. There he remained until 1936 when he had to flee Nazism due to his Jewish descent. In 1937 he went to South Africa. On arrival he was obliged to take the special qualifying examination before entering practice in the country, and became a member of the Institute of South African Architects in 1938. The very same year he set up offices in the new Washington House. Later he was able to establish an architectural office in Johannesburg. Commissions for houses followed and during forty active years he executed upwards of five hundred.

Ahrend's architectural style was divided into two design lines. On one side he can be described as rational but he also followed romantic aspects. His rational style was based on international industrial technology design and materials which can be found in his buildings for collective use which also reflect some regional flavour. On the other side his residential buildings display a more romantic attitude with more traditional finishes and materials of Baroque, Gothic and vernacular architecture. Among his works is the Social Sciences building, East Campus, University of the Witwatersrand executed until 1967. His office became the nursery for young talents.

Following his father's architectural principles, he designed buildings tailored to clients' needs, taking into account climatic conditions and site constraints.

"…as to the design and decision-making I may say that I never designed houses as my clients really wanted them nor as I would have like(d) to have had them but in a way which I thought was the right answer for that particular client: and that created the "success".
– Steffen Ahrends, 1990.

His particular interest was housing, aroused, he said, by his last three years in Germany (1933 to 1936). He is regarded as one of the most influential architects within Africa, as he handled form, light and space sensitively.

In 1972, he left South Africa for Casares, Andalucia, Spain, briefly returning to South Africa between 1975 and 1978 to design and build more houses.
