= Ernst Praetorius =

German conductor

Ernst Praetorius (20 September 1880 – 27 March 1946) was a German conductor, general music director, university lecturer and music historian.

== Life ==
Born in Berlin, Praetorius was the son of Orientalist Franz Praetorius and his wife Johanna Praetorius, née Blanck. He received violin lessons at an early age (1887–1892) with Emil Köhler in Breslau, from 1892 to 1899 with Arno Helf in Leipzig), and composition lessons with Otto Reubke in Halle. In addition to their practical exercise, Praetorius also dealt with music theory. From 1899 to 1905, he studied musicology and music history at the Humboldt University of Berlin with Carl Stumpf among others. He received his doctorate in 1905 with a thesis on The Mensural Theory of Franchinus Gaffurius and was director of the Museum of Musical Instruments of Leipzig University, then in Cologne, Worringerstrasse, between 1906 and 1909. From 1909 to 1912, Praetorius worked as répétiteur and Kapellmeister at the Cologne Opera. In 1912 and 1913 he was Kapellmeister at the Schauspielhaus Bochum, in 1913 and 1914 at the Neues Theater Leipzig and at the Stadttheater Breslau. Afterwards, he worked for one year at the Theater Lübeck, and from 1915 to 1922 he worked again at the Stadttheater Breslau. From 1922 to 1924 he was Kapellmeister at the Große Volksoper and at the Staatsoper Unter den Linden in Berlin. In 1924 he became general music director of the Deutsches Nationaltheater und Staatskapelle Weimar.

While the public and experts appreciated Praetorius, right-wing radicals attacked him violently. The reason for this was primarily his commitment to New Music. After Praetorius had brought Ernst Krenek's Jonny spielt auf to a performance in 1928, the Weimar newspaper Der Nationalsozialist a series of inflammatory articles against Praetorius. In 1930, the NSDAP, now represented for the first time in the Thuringian state government, tried to dismiss him. The advisory board of the National Theater, however, spoke out in favor of the retention of his general music director.

After the seizure of power by the National Socialists, Praetorius was immediately dismissed in February 1933. One of the reasons was his conducting of the opera Cardillac by Paul Hindemith. In addition, he married the Jewish Dr. Käthe Ruhemann (13 January 1891 in Berlin – 1981 in Ankara, Turkey, pediatrician, in 1st marriage married to Dr. Bruno Baruch Goldstein, resulting in 3 children). Under this political pressure, the two divorced in 1935 de jure, but they continued to live together. The Berlin opera houses refused Praetorius, who was now unemployed, an engagement, with the result that he worked as a taxi driver.

=== Exile in Turkey ===
Praetorius then received an offer from Turkey through Hindemith's mediation. Hindemith was an advisor for the development of the Turkish music scene and thus had the opportunity to place numerous people persecuted by the Germans in the cultural sector in Turkey, including the director Carl Ebert, the pedagogue Eduard Zuckmayer, the violinist Licco Amar and the pianist Georg Markowitz. All of them now participated in the establishment of the State Conservatory in Ankara. Praetorius was appointed conductor of the Ankara Symphony Orchestra on September 28, 1935. He also directed the chamber music ensemble at the conservatory and taught bassoon playing.

Praetorius was very well known in Ankara's musical life with his numerous concerts. He attempted to continue Hindemith's reforms even after his onward journey to the US and remained in contact with him. He had significant differences with Carl Ebert, with whom he worked as head of the theater and opera department. He criticized Ebert's teaching methods and also doubted his artistic abilities.

In 1937 Praetorius stayed in Germany for the last time and undertook a concert tour as conductor to Stuttgart, Königsberg and Berlin from July to September. He repeatedly tried to engage German virtuosi in Turkey. In 1943 and 1944 he gave concerts in Ankara together with Wilhelm Kempff and Walter Gieseking – Turkey was still neutral during the World War. During this time, Praetorius also began to build up a conservatory orchestra, which subsequently enjoyed success with numerous concerts. Praetorius always tried to include Turkish culture in his performances. In addition to works of European classical music, he also performed works by contemporary Turkish composers, such as Ulvi Cemal Erkin, whenever possible.

Through contacts with the German Embassy in Ankara, Praetorius was able to have his divorced wife join him in 1936. In 1940, with the permission of the president İsmet İnönü, he also brought his mother-in-law to Turkey.

After the beginning of the Second World War, the Germans pursued the expatriation of emigrants in Turkey. In 1941, the NSDAP applied to have Praetorius denied German citizenship because he was still living with his Jewish wife and was "President of an Association for the Support of Jewish Emigrants". Due to his outstanding position at the head of the symphony orchestra founded by President Mustafa Kemal Atatürk in Ankara, the emigration was ultimately abandoned. The German ambassador in Ankara, Franz von Papen, feared an "embarrassing sensation". Thanks to Praetorius' extraordinary prestige, he and his family were even spared internment in Anatolia, which affected all other German refugees as enemy statesmen after Turkey entered the war in 1944.

Praetorius died in 1946 after a short illness at the age of 65. He was buried in Ankara in the Cebeci Asri Mezarlığı. His wife Käthe Praetorius remained in Ankara until the end of her life. Since 1946 she was in charge of an ambulance of the British Embassy for two decades. In addition, she had been the medical officer of the German Embassy in Ankara since its establishment.
