= Eduard Zuckmayer =

German composer, conductor, and pianist (1890–1972)

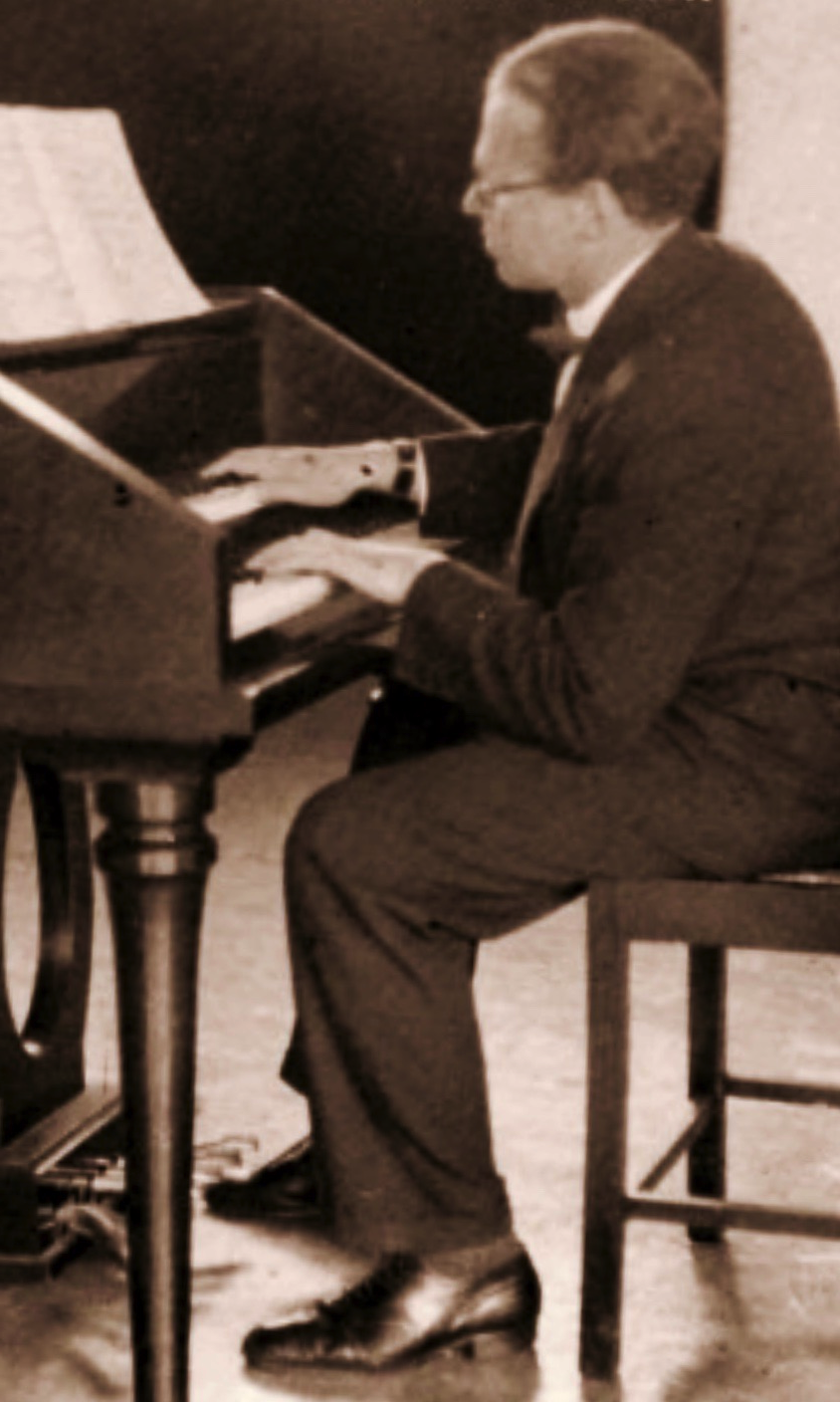
- Zuckmeyer at his Harpsichord at progressive boarding school Schule am Meer on Juist Island

Background information
- Born: 3 August 1890; Nackenheim, Rhineland-Palatinate, German Empire
- Died: 2 July 1972 (aged 81) Ankara, Turkey
- Occupations: Composer, conductor, pianist
- Instrument: Piano

Eduard Zuckmayer (3 August 1890 – 2 July 1972) was a German music educator, composer, conductor and pianist. He was the older brother of the famous German writer Carl Zuckmayer (1896–1977).

== Family and Youth ==
He was the first son of wealthy factory owner Carl Zuckmayer (1864–1947) who produced tamper-evident lids for wine bottles in Nackenheim, a wine-growing village on the Rhine front. The parents of his mother, Amalie Zuckmayer (1869–1954, née Goldschmidt), were converted from Judaism to Protestantism whereas he was raised as a Catholic.

From the age of six, he got piano lessons. His talent was recognised early. At the age of twelve, he started to compose. However, he started to study jurisprudence but soon quit. In 1909 he took private piano lessons from Robert Kahn (1865–1951) and James Kwast (1852–1927) in Berlin. He also attended the conductor's school of Fritz Steinbach (1855–1916) and became a piano pupil of Lazzaro Uzielli (1861–1943) at Conservatory in Cologne. In 1914, he got concert level as pianist and conductor.

== Work ==
=== Germany ===
In 1915 he was a conductor at City theatre in Mainz. He and his younger brother volunteered as soldiers in World War I. He was severely wounded and decorated twice with the Iron Cross 2nd class and later with the Iron Cross 1st class. Between 1919 and 1925 he lived in Frankfurt where he performed Paul Hindemith's Sonata in D for violin and piano op. 11, No. 2. He worked as a music teacher, conductor, and pianist. In 1923 he became co-founder of Gesellschaft für Neue Musik (= Society of New Music) in Mainz and Wiesbaden. From 1923 to 1925 he also led a piano class at Mainz Conservatory. At that time he was regarded as a brilliant concert pianist with a high chance for a marvellous career. But as an enthusiast of German Jugendmusikbewegung (= Youth Music Movement) he wanted to participate in the education of a new generation as a countermovement to the tattered political situation at Weimar Republic. He wanted music to be a part of many people's life. In contrary to middle-class culture Jugendmusikbewegung enhanced the status of amateur music.

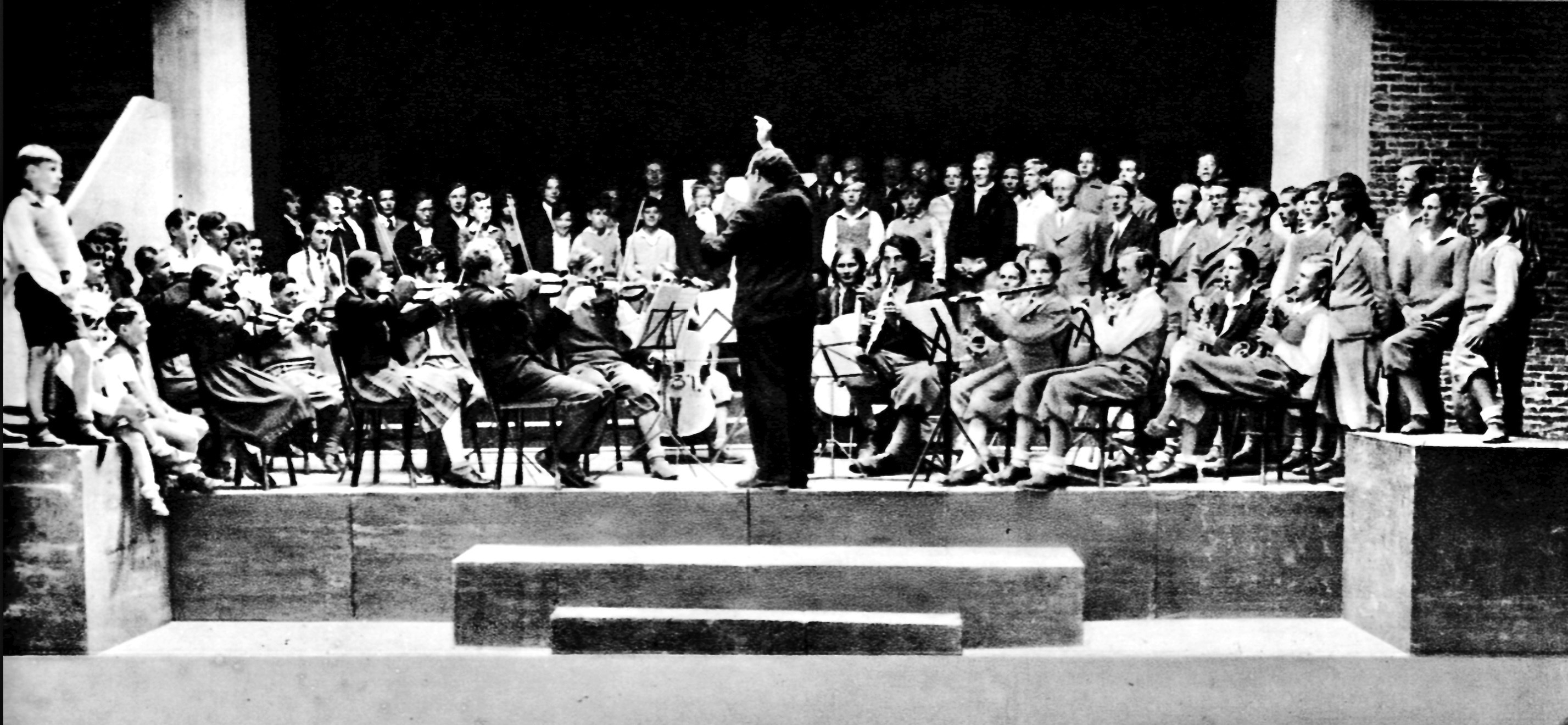
Eduard Zuckmayer conducts choir and orchestra of Schule am Meer on Juist Island

Therefore, he followed a call of pedagogue Martin Luserke (1880–1968) to work as a music teacher at Schule am Meer, a progressive boarding school on Juist Island at North Sea. There he founded the school's choir and its orchestra which included all pupils. In this progressive school sports, music and community theatre were elementary. Musical education was regarded as bridging between the fine arts and life. With his pupils Zuckmayer went on several tours through Germany and got very positive reviews in contemporary newspapers. He also set one of his brother's plays, "Cockatoo Kakada", to music. Other lyrics were created by Luserke. When Nazism was brought to power in January 1933 the school's work became much more difficult since it counted about one third Jewish pupils and teachers. Due to Antisemitism and "Gleichschaltung" (= Nazification) the school closed in spring 1934. Zuckmayer changed to Odenwaldschule, another progressive boarding school in Hesse. "Racial reasons" were mentioned when he became thrown out of Reichsmusikkammer (RMK) in 1935.

=== Turkey ===
He had to leave Germany in 1936 and migrated to Turkey, where Paul Hindemith (1895–1963) was already busy reforming the Turkish music education, assigned by the Turkish president Kemal Atatürk. Hindemith mediated Zuckmayer's employment at the newly founded Music Conservatory of Ankara. There he met German colleagues like stage director Carl Ebert (1887–1980), conductor Ernst Praetorius (1880–1946), violinist Licco Amar (1891–1959) and many others from German music and theatre who were forced to flee from Nazism. Initially he led the pupils' orchestra of Musiki Muallim Mektebi, where music teachers were trained. But in autumn of 1936 he got appointed as chorus leader of the drama play and opera division. He also became pianist of the Ankara symphony orchestra conducted by Praetorius and was deputy of Hindemith. In 1938 Gisela Jockisch (1905–1985), née Günther, followed him with her little daughter Melanie to Turkey. She was the wife of pedagogue Walter Jockisch (1907–1970). Jockisch and Zuckmayer had been colleagues at Schule am Meer on Juist Island. Gisela Jockisch and Eduard Zuckmayer lived together in Turkey but were not able to marry before 1947 because German authorities in 1938 neglected a certificate of no impediment to marriage (Ehefähigkeitszeugnis) due to racist Nuremberg Laws (Nürnberger Gesetze).

In 1938, the music branch of the teacher's college Gazi Eğitim Enstitüsü (Gazi Institute for Education) was founded. Zuckmayer became its director of the music division which he held until 1970. He gave distinction to the Turkish music pedagogy. Until 1970 he trained nearly all Turkish music teachers (about 600 in total) who later taught throughout the country. He integrated fundamentals of the German Jugendmusikbewegung into Turkish music pedagogy. One of his later well-known pupils was conductor Hikmet Şimşek.

In 1940 his brother Carl wanted to help his brother to follow him to the United States with an affidavit of support where he already had migrated. He was worried about his safety since German troops were fighting in close range to Turkey in Greece as well as in southern regions of the Soviet Union. He contacted Hindemith in that matter.

In 1944 all German migrants were called upon by the Turkish government to leave Turkey. Eduard Zuckmayer refused and got detained in Kırşehir detainment camp in Anatolia. Even there he very soon established a choir with whom he performed a mass by Giovanni Pierluigi da Palestrina at Pentecost 1945. Hindemith who meanwhile had migrated to the US tried to intervene against Zuckmayer's detainment. He sent a telegram to Turkish president İsmet İnönü but it was not successful. After the end of World War II Zuckmayer was able to leave the detainment camp and was reinstated to his former positions. He also taught music theory at Ankara Conservatory. Former Daimler-Benz chairman Edzard Reuter who lived in Turkey at that time described Zuckmayer as a "dignified and quiet man" who created a "unique atmosphere" when he "sat down to play the piano".

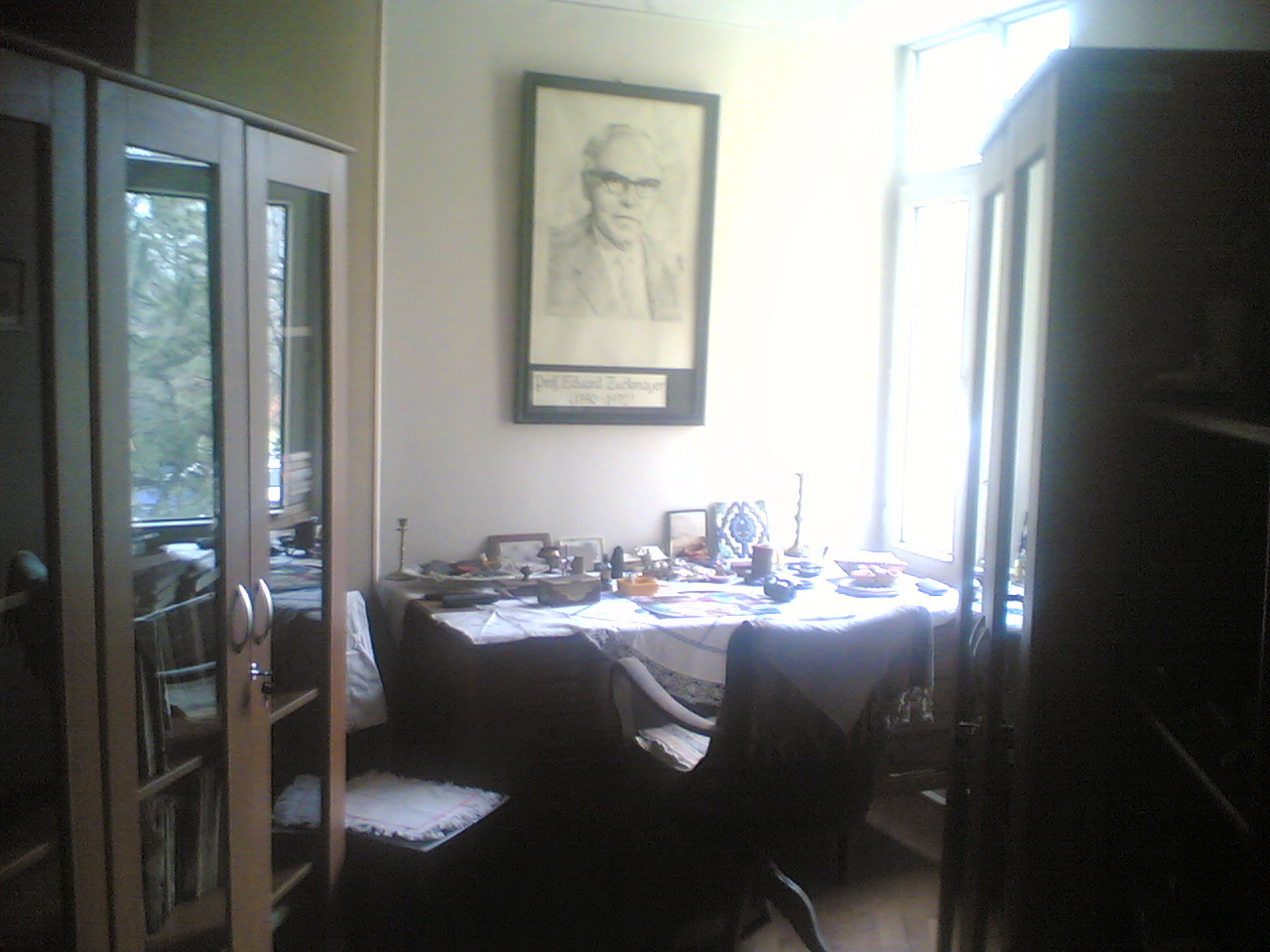
Study room of Eduard Zuckmayer in Ankara

In 1947 he was finally able to marry his partner Gisela Jockisch. But in 1950 she left Turkey with his adopted daughter Michaela to remigrate to Germany. Later both migrated to the United States. Zuckmayer instead stayed at his place of activity. Even in old age he performed as a concert pianist and conductor in Ankara, Istanbul and İzmir. He had internalised the Turkish language as rarely another migrant ever had. Since his entry to Turkey he had pled for the translation of German folk songs into the Turkish language. Meanwhile, they were integrated into Turkish music schoolbooks. He also transmitted Turkish folk tunes to polyphonic choral singing.

On the occasion of his 20th obit in 1992 a conference was held in Ankara where some of his works were performed. Zuckmayer died in the age of 81. His grave is in Ankara, Turkey.

=== Publications and legacy ===
During his years in Turkey, Zuckmayer translated and wrote several music texts for educational use. His Turkish-language translation of Büyük Besteciler Küçük Portreler (Great Composers in Short Portraits), published by the Ministry of National Education Press in 1962, introduced major Western composers to Turkish readers. (KAŞİF record)

He also wrote an article on Paul Hindemith, published in Opus (Vol. 2, No. 18, 1964, pp. 2–4). (KAŞİF record)

After his death, Adnan Atalay and Nurhan Cangal, working together, prepared the instructional series Müzik Teorisi (Armoni ve Kontrpuan) I–III for YAYKUR (Open Higher Education Institution) by revising and completing the harmonized examples of Prof. Eduard Zuckmayer. Published from 1976 onward, these volumes were adopted as official textbooks in the music departments of teacher-training institutes in Turkey and are catalogued in the Turkish National Library.

(Vol. I record · Vol. III record)

== Awards and distinctions ==
- 1914 – Wüllner Award, Cologne, Germany
- WWI – Iron Cross 2nd class, Iron Cross 1st class

== Literature ==
- Songül Demren: „…und ich danke Gott, bei den Türken zu sein!“. Eduard Zuckmayer in Ankara, in: Zuckmayer-Jahrbuch, Vol. 3, Wallstein Verlag, Göttingen 2000, pp. 481–504.
- Sabine Hillebrecht (Ed.): Haymatloz. Exil in der Türkei 1933–1945. Exhibition of Verein Aktives Museum and Goethe Institute with Akademy of Arts, 8 January to 20 February 2000, (= Schriftenreihe des Vereins Aktives Museum, Vol. 8), Verein Aktives Museum, Berlin 2000.
- Burcu Dogramaci: Eduard Zuckmayer, in Maurer Zenck, Claudia und Petersen, Peter (Ed.): Lexikon verfolgter Musiker und Musikerinnen der NS-Zeit. LexM. Universität Hamburg, Musikwissenschaftliches Institut, Hamburg 2007

== See also ==
- Adnan Atalay
