= Robert von Haug =

German painter

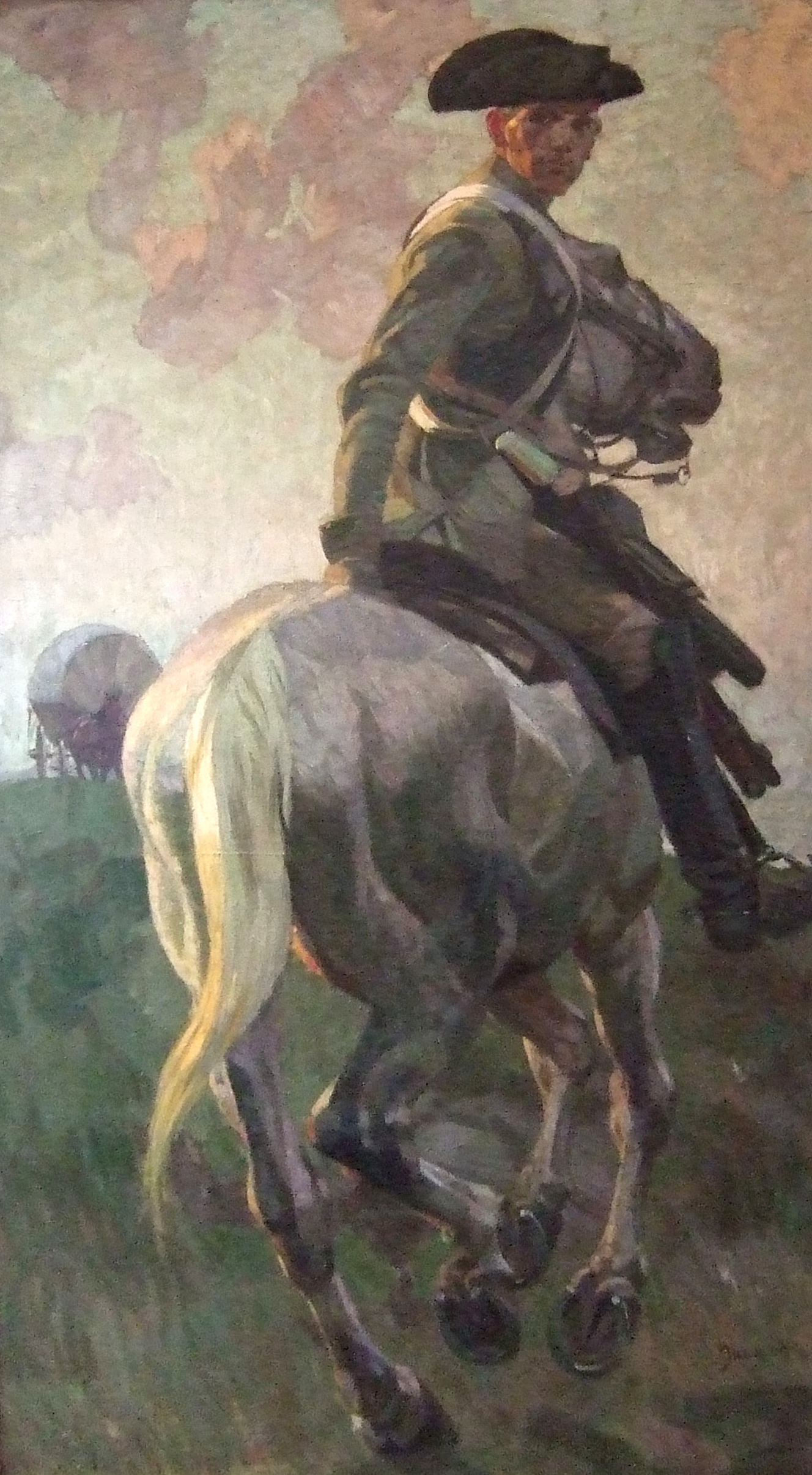
Cavalryman (1909)

Robert von Haug (27 May 1857, Stuttgart – 3 April 1922, Stuttgart) was a German impressionist painter, illustrator and lithographer who specialized in scenes from the "Befreiungskriege".

== Life ==
From 1872 to 1877, he was enrolled at the State Academy of Fine Arts Stuttgart (German: Staatliche Akademie der Bildenden Künste Stuttgart), then spent two years at the Academy of Fine Arts, Munich, where he studied with Carl von Häberlin, Bernhard von Neher and Otto Seitz. While there, he was a close associate of Karl Stauffer-Bern and Ludwig von Herterich. In 1879, he returned to Stuttgart. His first major exhibitions came after 1883, including one at the Glaspalast, but his chief occupation was book illustrating. He also painted frescoes for the Stuttgart City Hall.

He became a professor at the Kunstschule in 1894. From 1912 to 1916 he was also the school's Director. One of his best-known students was Carl Geist. Around 1912 a dispute began between the Avant-garde faction led by Adolf Hölzel and the Traditionalists, with whom Haug sided. He was replaced as Director by Hölzel, who resigned three years later when the school rejected Paul Klee for a teaching post.
