= Juist =

- Municipality
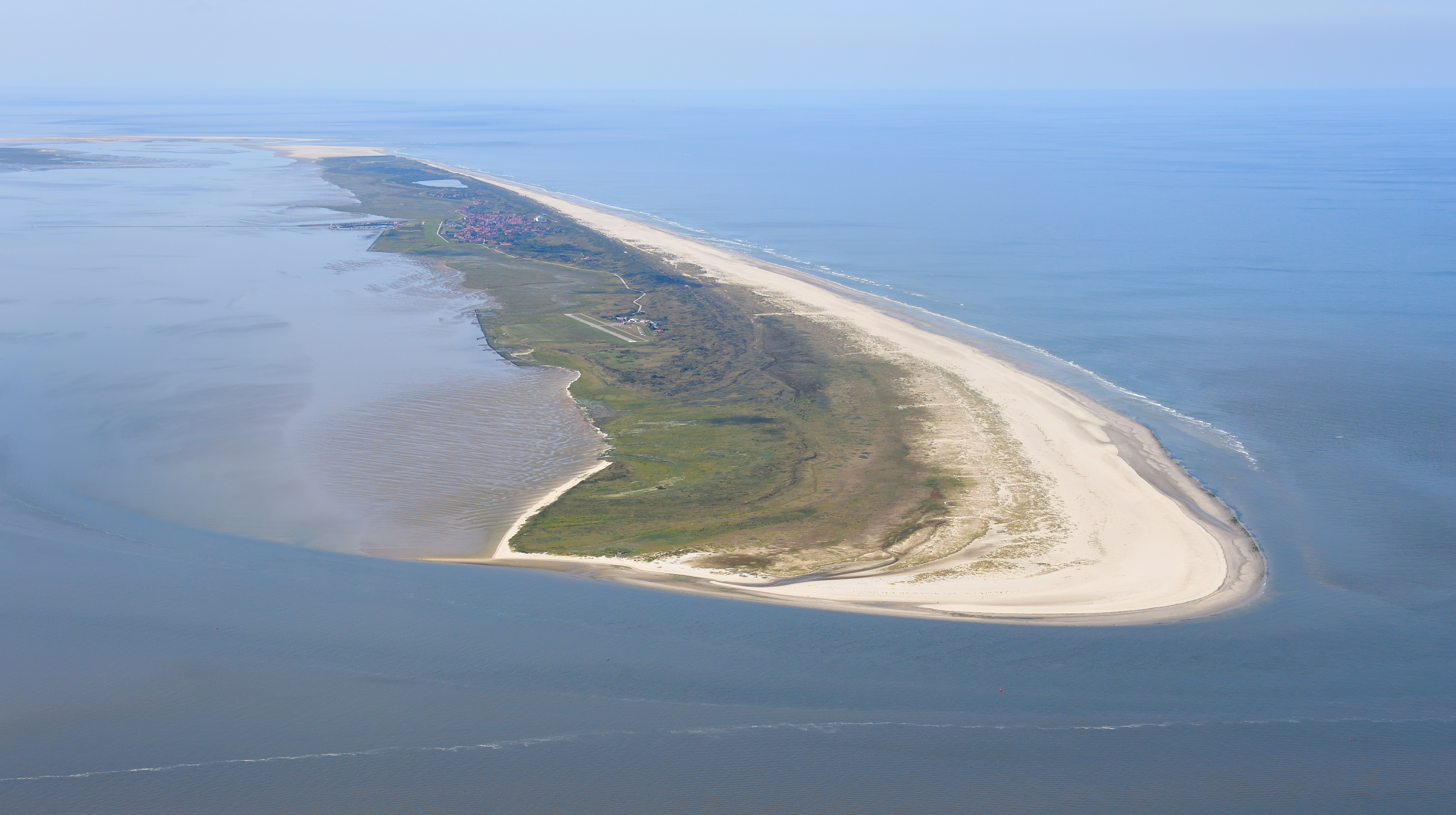
- Aerial view of Juist from the east

- Flag Coat of arms

- Location of Juist within Aurich district
- Interactive map of Juist
- Location within Germany Location within Lower Saxony
- Coordinates: 53°40′43″N 6°59′51″E
- Country: Germany
- State: Lower Saxony
- District: Aurich
- Subdivisions: 1 District

Government
  - Mayor (2016–26): Tjark Axel Goerges

Area
  - Total: 16.41 km^{2} (6.34 sq mi)
- Elevation: 3 m (9.8 ft)

Population (2025-12-31)
  - Total: 1,081
  - Density: 65.87/km^{2} (170.6/sq mi)
- Time zone: UTC+01:00 (CET)
  - Summer (DST): UTC+02:00 (CEST)
- Postal codes: 26557–26571
- Dialling codes: 04935
- Vehicle registration: AUR
- Website: www.juist.de

Juist (German pronunciation: [ˈjyːst]; Low German: Juist) is an island and municipality in the district of Aurich in Lower Saxony in Germany. The island is one of seven East Frisian Islands at the edge of the Lower Saxon Wadden Sea in the southern North Sea. It is located between Borkum Island (west), Memmert Island (southwest) and Norderney (east). The island is 17 km (11 mi) long and from 500 metres (1,600 ft) to 1 kilometre (0.62 mi) wide, depending on the tide levels. There are two villages on the island: the main village Juist, and Loog. The island is separated from Norderney by the Norderneyer Seegatt.

== Overview and geography ==
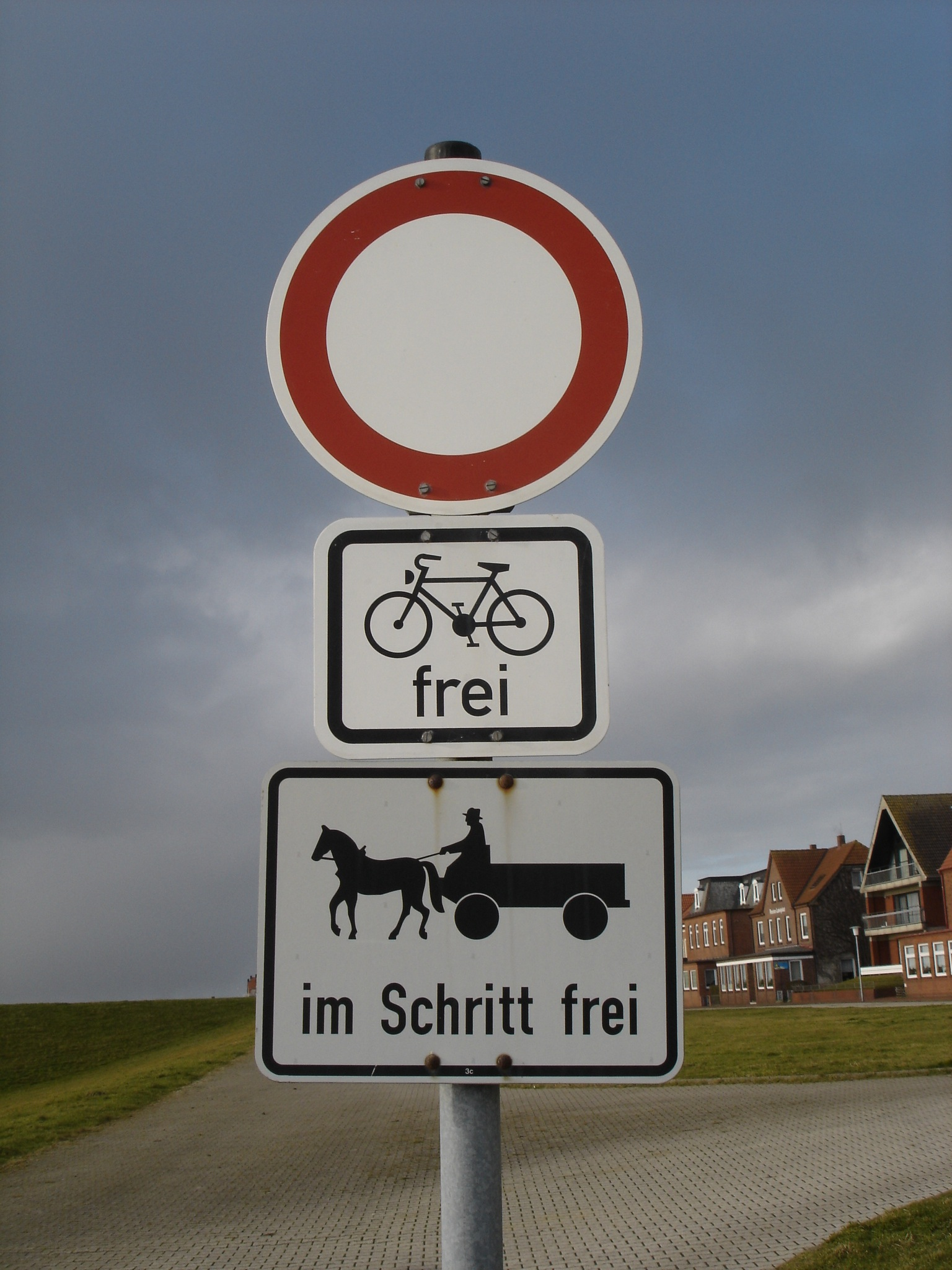
Juist rules of the road: no entry except for bicycles and horse-drawn carriages proceeding at walking pace

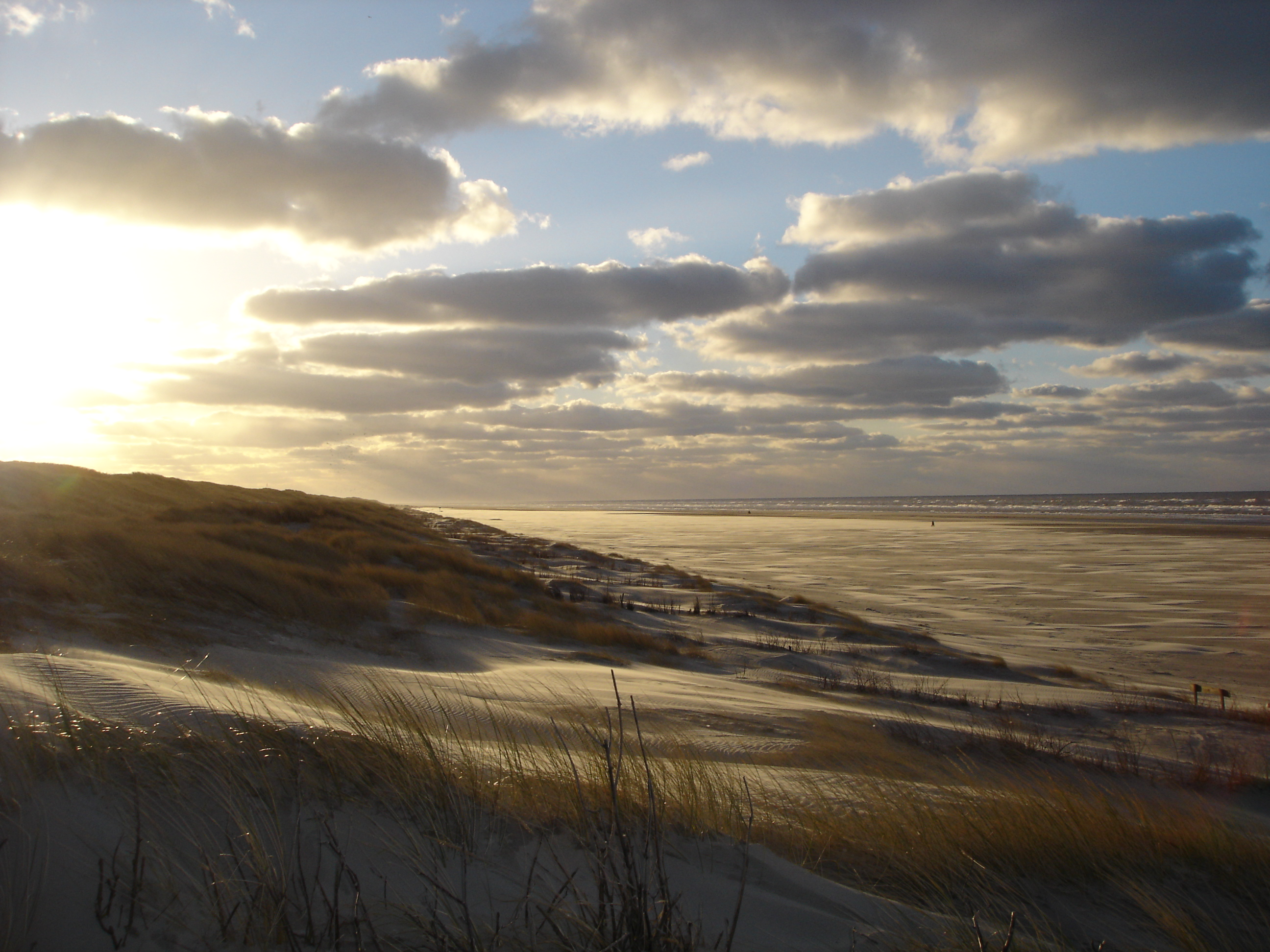
Juist beach in winter

The tallest buildings on Juist that can be seen from the North Sea are the water tower and an old hotel. There is a lighthouse on the island, but it is not in use. At the western end of the island is the Billreef, a large sandbank where birds such as dunlins, grey plovers and knots rest during their migration. In the western part of the island, the beach and the dunes are eroded by the sea. The edge of the dunes moves about five metres south each winter. On the western third of the island is Lake Hammersee, a freshwater lake.

Juist is accessible by plane or daily ferry. FLN Frisia Luftverkehr operates planes between Norden and Juist. Most motor vehicles are prohibited on the island, with only the fire department, the German Red Cross and doctors allowed to use them. Island tractors require a special license, while most other transport is done by bike or horse-drawn carriage. It was reported by the Reuters news agency, on 24 September 2014, that an unmanned "parcelcopter" will commence delivery of urgent drugs and supplies to the island by DHL. It will be the first time an unmanned aircraft had been authorised to deliver goods in Europe and the first time that automated drones have been used to deliver medicines anywhere in the world. The flight at an altitude of 50 m and at a speed of up to 18 m/s will be automated but monitored in Norddeich.

== Economy ==
Tourism is the main source of income for Juist's economy. Almost all the buildings on the island feature guestrooms, with several hotels and a youth hostel also on the island. There used to be an island partnership between Juist and Hiddensee in the Baltic Sea between 1990 and 2000.

== History ==
In the 17th and 18th centuries, Juist was cut in two parts by several storm tides (see St. Peter's Flood). Around the year 1770 people started to close the 2 km wide burst at the southern side by a dune dike. As recently as 1928 the northern side was repaired. By that time, the water in Lake Hammersee had turned from saltwater to freshwater. On September 9, 2001, Juist citizens voted for their mayor directly for the first time, with Karl-Josef Wederhake winning the election. He was re-elected in September 2006.

== Juist Island Railway ==
The former Juist Island Railway was a small narrow-gauge line built to move passengers and freight between the island’s landing stage out in the Wadden Sea and the village. It opened on 19 June 1898 as a horse-drawn tramway, but after storm damage the operation was rebuilt and switched to motor traction in 1899, making the railway an early pioneer of internal-combustion traction on Germany’s islands. Over the decades, maintaining the elevated pier and trackwork in the tidal flats was costly, and once a new harbour closer to the village was created, the railway became unnecessary; the last train ran on 10 March 1982, marking the end of an 84-year chapter in Juist’s transport history.

== Airfield ==
The Juist Airfield is a small public airfield located at the eastern end of the island. Because the island is largely car-free and ferry connections depend on tidal conditions, the airfield plays an important role in supplying the island and enabling fast travel between the mainland and Juist. It lies about 4–4.5 km from the main village and can be reached on foot, by bicycle, or by horse-drawn carriage along the Flugplatzstraße. Flights to Juist are typically operated with small aircraft, and the short flight over the Wadden Sea takes only a few minutes, offering visitors a quick alternative to longer ferry journeys. In addition to transport services, the airfield is also a popular destination for sightseeing flights and visiting pilots, making it both an infrastructure hub and a tourist attraction for the island.

== Harbor ==
The harbor of Juist is the island’s key arrival and supply point, because visitors typically reach Juist by ferry and everyday logistics depend on maritime transport. Ferry traffic to and from Norddeich is strongly tide-dependent, so departure times vary and can shift with weather and water levels in the Wadden Sea. As a result, the port is not only a transport hub for passengers but also a practical interface for freight and services that keep the car-free island running, linking the terminal area with onward movement across the island.

== Notable people ==
- Curt Bruns (1915–1945) was a war criminal who was executed for the murders of two American-Jewish POWs. He was one of the first Nazi war criminals to be executed in Allied-occupied Germany.
- Martin Luserke (1880–1968) founded Stiftung Schule am Meer in 1924 and Schule am Meer in 1925 on Juist.
- Ma Anand Sheela (born 1949) lived in Juist after leaving Rajneeshpuram in Oregon.
