= Martin Luserke =

German author (1880–1968)

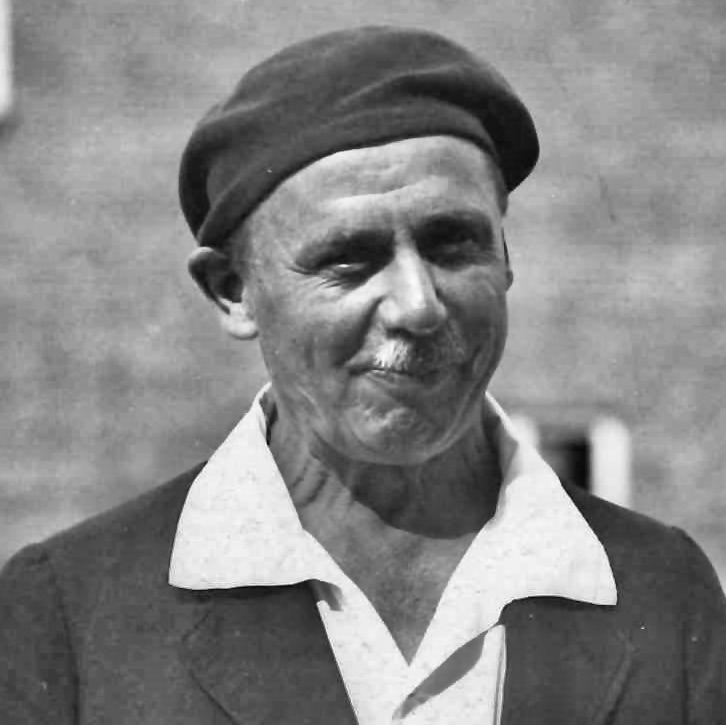
- Martin Luserke at Schule am Meer, Juist, East Frisia, Prussia, 1931
- Born: 3 May 1880; Schöneberg near Berlin, Prussia, German Reich
- Died: 1 June 1968 (aged 88); Meldorf, Holstein, Germany
- Resting place: Hage, East Frisia (until 2018), gravestone moved to Juist island's dune cemetery
- Education: Herrnhuter Lehrerseminar, University of Jena
- Occupations: Progressive educator, bard, storyteller, writer and theatre maker
- Spouse: Marie Anna "Annemarie" Elisabeth Gerwien (1878–1926)
- Children: 4 (one daughter, three sons)
- Relatives: Carl Fridrich Wilhelm Luserke (1851–1931) and Amalie Elisabeth Luserke (1855–1942), nee Lindhorst
- Writing career
- Notable awards: 1st Prize of Literaturpreis der Reichshauptstadt Berlin (1935); Cross of Merit (1954); Friedrich-Hebbel-Preis (1958); Golden Medal of University of Kiel (1960)
- Movements: Progressive education, German Youth Movement

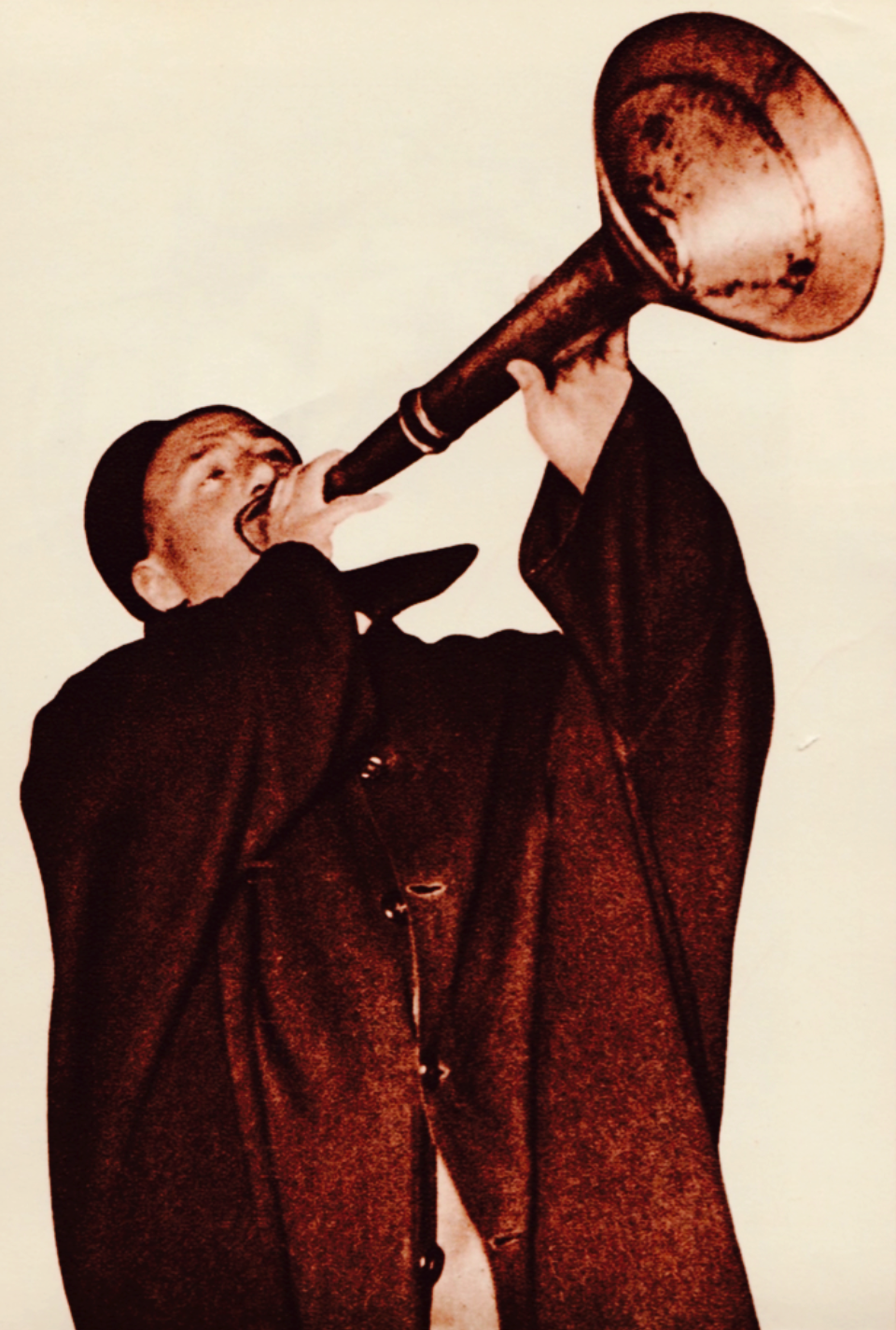
Martin Luserke singing out a seamanlike "rise, rise…" to wake his pupils of Schule am Meer (= School by the Sea), 1931

Martin Luserke (3 May 1880 – 1 June 1968) was a German progressive pedagogue, bard, writer and theatre maker. He was one of the leading figures of German progressive education and a precursor of outdoor education. His most significant achievement was the integration of community theatre into school and youth work, coining the terms "Bewegungsspiel" (movement play/acting) and "Darstellendes Spiel" (representative play/acting), used in German curricula to this day. Community theatre was integrated into the German Youth Movement as well.

== Family and youth ==
Martin Otto Rudolf Luserke was born in Berlin, as one of four sons of construction overseer Carl Friedrich Wilhelm Luserke (1851–1931) and Amalie Elisabeth Luserke (1855–1942), née Lindhorst. His mother was Westphalian, whereas the Luserke family, carpenters for several generations, originated from Breslau, Silesia. Both were Pietists. He had an older brother, Johannes Fridrich Wilhelm (* 6. April 1877 in Berlin; † 4. April 1949 in Dresden), and a younger brother, Otto Karl Gottfried Luserke (* 19. November 1887 in Berlin). His father, originally a mason, won a stipend to study at Technical University Aachen (RWTH). He worked as a drafter on Berlin Anhalter Bahnhof, in construction oversight, private and public, and was a self-declared architect.

During his childhood, Martin Luserke got the chance to become acquainted with the port of Hamburg, the river Elbe and the German coast along the North Sea and the Baltic Sea. Via sailboat and steamboat, he got to know the East Frisian island Spiekeroog and Heligoland in the German Bight. According to his mother's memoirs he felt drawn to the sea from a young age. His parents refused to let him go, as he apparently didn't take heed of its dangers.

He was said to have read works by Friedrich Schiller by the age of ten, William Shakespeare, Goethe and Ibsen at thirteen, all comprehensively and passionately. He had his first contact with a stage when fifteen years old, seeing Schiller's William Tell staged by Max Reinhardt at Schauspielhaus Berlin. The play fell short of his high expectations from reading. He attributed his disappointment to the overloaded set. This experience might have been an influence on his own conceptions of theatre works.

In 1895, he broke with his family. The catalyst was a moment when his mother burnt his complete edition of Shakespeare which he had read in secret. After this, he attempted to complete his unfinished reading of The Tempest with his own poetry. He also felt his family home was restrictive and joyless, authoritarian and overshadowed by "cold" faith that left no place for supposedly unchristian literature.

In 1908, he married Marie Anna "Annemarie" Elisabeth Gerwien (1878–1926). He met her through his work as a teacher for Wickersdorf Free School Community, where she worked as a matron. She was the daughter of Prussian Oberstleutnant (= Lieutenant Colonel) Paul Vincenz Gerwien (* 7 December 1843 in Neisse; † 12 September 1923 in Dresden). The couple had four children, one girl and three boys: Ursula (* 20 January 1910 in Wickersdorf; † 1987), Klaus (* 6 October 1912 in Wickersdorf), Heiner (* 4 August 1914 in Wickersdorf) und Dieter (* 15 September 1918; † 17. February 2005). Between 1938 and 1968 Auguste Schwarting became Luserke's housekeeper.

== Education ==
As his pietist parents preferred christian to public school, Luserke started his with the Herrnhuter Brüdergemeine in Berlin, and was enrolled at Herrnhuter Lehrerseminar in Niesky, Lusatia at age fourteen, to become a teacher. Between 1900 and 1904 he worked as an elementary teacher at Pädagogium Niesky, to pay off the debt for his education. During this time, he got estranged from Pietism which he found cold-hearted. He moved to Thuringia and studied Mathematics and Philosophy at Friedrich Schiller University Jena.

In 1905, his oceanographic excursion to Brittany turned into a hike of several months through the remains of Celtic Stone Age culture. A bard's performance on the island of Molène supposedly inspired his later use of oral and written tradition like myths, sagas and legends in his own work. He also travelled to Italy and Egypt.

His academic teachers, the Nobel Prize winner Rudolf Christoph Eucken, Ernst Haeckel, Wilhelm Rein, and later Hermann Lietz, were a major influence on his ideas about education. Luserke's ideals of lifelike education for the purpose of developing convictions (Gesinnung) can be traced back to them. Disappointed by academic teaching programme and classical pedagogy, he dropped out of university in 1906.

In 1931 Luserke obtained a mariner's license for small seacraft in Leer, East Frisia.

== Career ==
=== 1906: D.L.E.H. Haubinda ===
In 1906 he joined progressive pedagogue Hermann Lietz in teaching at Deutsches Landerziehungsheim (D.L.E.H.) in Haubinda. The Thuringian school had excluded Jewish pupils three years before, during a controversy known as "Haubinder Judenkrach" and only accepted new ones on an exceptional basis. Luserke wouldn't follow the example during the founding of his own school later on and opposed the school's pedagogy, based on protecting pupils from "endangerment by their inborn Evil". According to Walter Benjamin (1892–1940), only Luserke and Gustav Wyneken (1875–1964) opposed the daily military. The resulting conflict with the administration led to both teachers leaving the school in the same year.

=== 1906–1925: Freie Schulgemeinde Wickersdorf ===
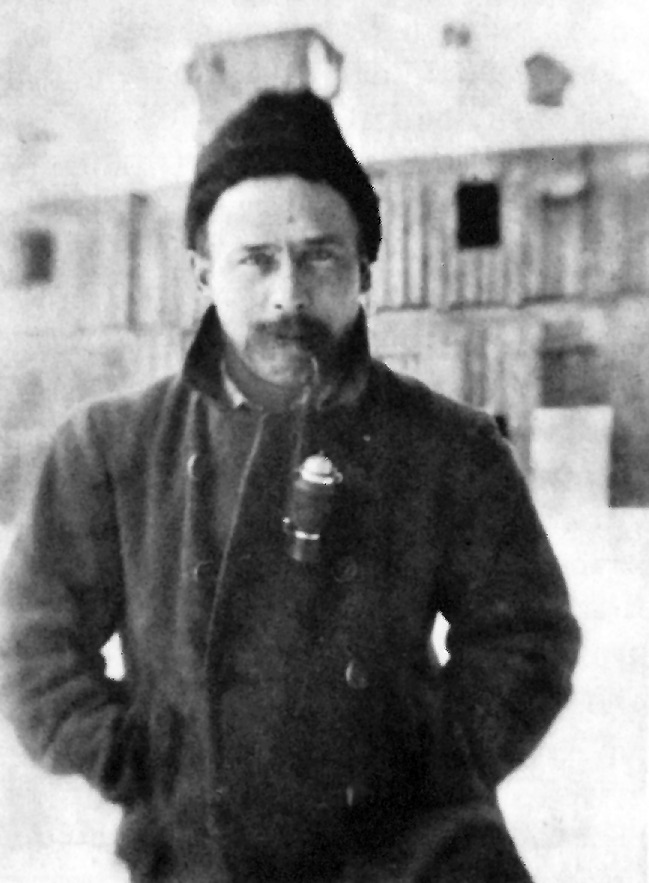
Martin Luserke on excursion in the Fichtel Mountains, 1910

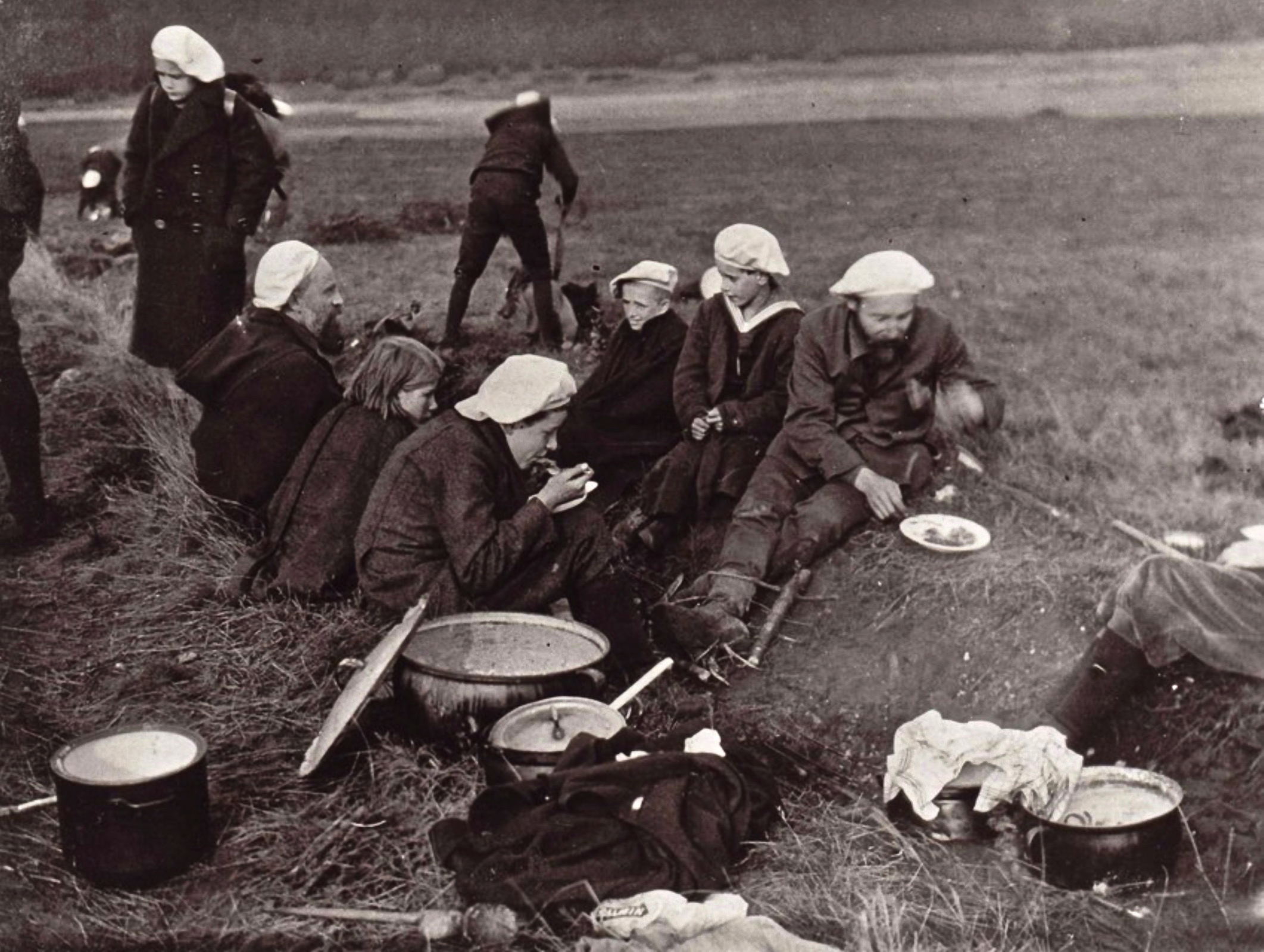
Gustav Wyneken (sitting on the left) and principal Martin Luserke (on the right), both with full beards, during a lunch break while accompanying their students of Freie Schulgemeinde from Wickersdorf to a youth meeting atop Hoher Meißner in October 1913

In autumn 1906, Luserke and other "pedagogic rebels", among them Gustav Wyneken, Paul Geheeb and August Halm, founded the Freie Schulgemeinde in Wickersdorf, near Saalfeld in the Thuringian Forest. Whereas Wyneken is described more as a theoretician, Luserke is said to have been the driving force in practice. His hands-on-approach to experiential didactics supposedly influenced several other pedagogues like Hans Alfken, and he worked with Hans-Windekilde Jannasch, Peter Suhrkamp and Bernhard Uffrecht (1885–1959). During this time, he created his first plays for community theatre and tales. His first play Blut und Liebe, Blood and Love, a Grotesque based on Hamlet, is performed in schools to this day.

Between 1910 and 1914 and again between 1922 and 1925, Luserke served as the school's principal. From 1914 to 1918 he served as a soldier in World War I. In 1917 he was severely wounded in France and became a prisoner of war. His head injury marked him for life, so he always wore a cap. Influenced by the German Revolution of 1918–19, he was one of the authors (along with George Bernard Shaw) of a book series by Marxist Karl Korsch (1886–1961). In his book, Luserke opted for a socialist ethic of work which should follow common interests.

In school pedagogical conflicts with Gustav Wyneken were persistent. Wyneken was part of several paedophile scandals and later got sentenced. Some other teachers also were paedophiles. Luserke, Rudolf Aeschlimann (1884–1961) and Dr. Paul Reiner (1886–1932) first formed a so-called triumvirate in opposition to Wyneken and his followers. It resulted not only in a polarization but in a development of factions which divided teachers, employees and pupils.

=== 1925–1934: Schule am Meer ===
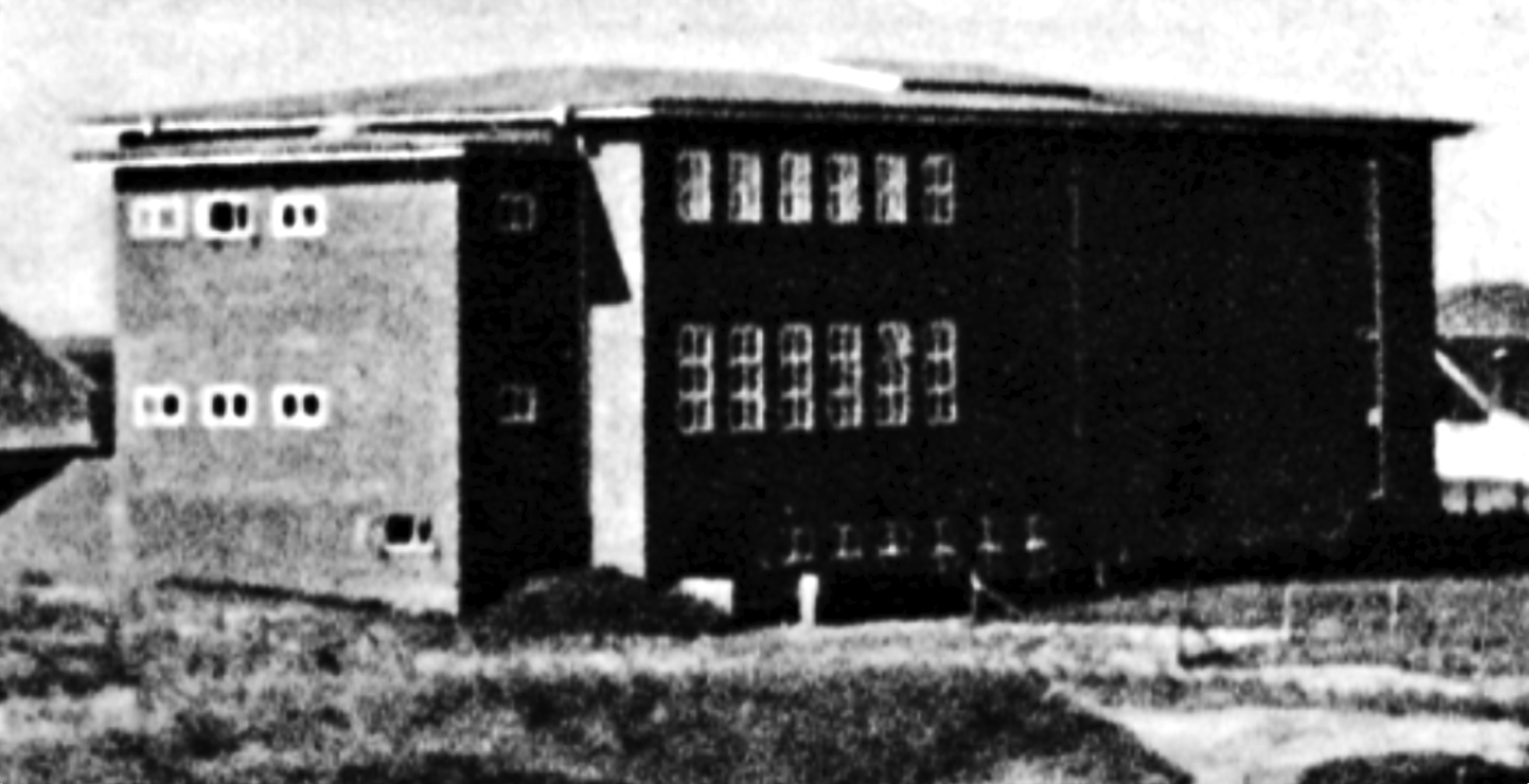
Theatre of Schule am Meer on Juist Island, built by Bruno Ahrends in 1930/31

After leaving Wickersdorf, Luserke decided to found Schule am Meer (= School by the Sea), a new school "at the border of the habitable world", Juist Island in East Frisia. He, Aeschlimann, Reiner, Fritz Hafner and other co-workers moved to the North Sea island with their families and sixteen of their pupils, and started a foundation in 1924.

The school was officially founded on 1 May 1925, as Germany's first open-air school and later the only school with a free-standing, dedicated theatre building at the time. The unique project primarily spanned a group of five school buildings which were planned in 1929 by Berlin-based architect Bruno Ahrends. The theatre was erected between 1930 and 1931.

It was used for community theatre, the school's choir and the school's orchestra, conducted by composer and pianist Eduard Zuckmayer (1890–1972), the older brother of famous writer Carl Zuckmayer who visited and worked at Schule am Meer. With their pupils Luserke and Zuckmayer went on tour through major German cities like Berlin, Cologne or Stuttgart to perform on stages where they got very positive critics in the newspapers.

Heinrich Meyer started his career at Schule am Meer, Hans Hess, Walter Georg Kühne, Felicitas Kukuck, and Beate Uhse belonged to its pupils. The school created a botanical garden right in the dunes of the sandbank and developed eleven vegetable gardens for self-supply. In the school's workshops detailed ship models were built as well as seakeeping sailboats (dinghy cruisers) but also parts to build up wooden shacks. Its sports programme included gymnastics and cold baths in the sea, athletics, boxing, fistball, association football, handball, field hockey, ice skate, prisonball and sailing. When Luserke's renowned school was closed in spring 1934 due to Nazi Gleichschaltung (= Nazification) and Antisemitism he decided to work as a free writer.

=== Krake ZK 14 ===
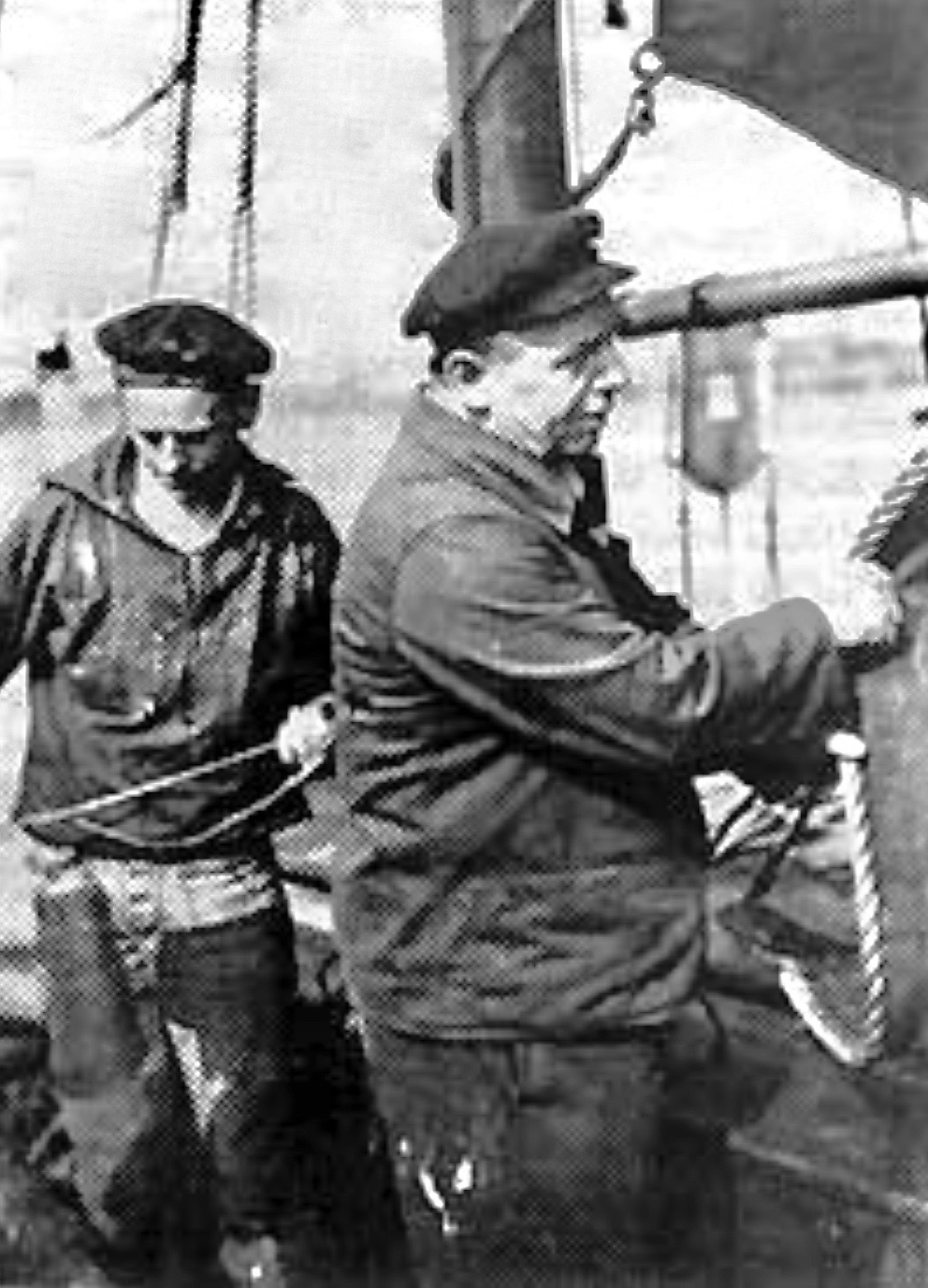
Dieter and Martin Luserke aboard Krake

In the Netherlands he bought the old Dutch fishery vessel ZK 14, which he named Krake (= octopus). Henceforward he deployed it as his floating poet's workshop to sail the shallow waters of the coastal regions of The Netherlands, Germany, Denmark, Southern Norway and Southern Sweden. In the harbours he opened his ship for tale-telling and readings. Mostly young people visited his ship, some attended during trip sections. One of the later well-known listeners and passengers was Beate Uhse, one of his former pupils. In 1935 he got awarded with Literaturpreis der Reichshauptstadt Berlin (= literature award of Reich's capital Berlin) for his historic novel Hasko which was published in German, Dutch and French. He also wrote his most favourite book Obadjah und die ZK 14 and a Viking trilogy.

=== Meldorf, Holstein ===
At the end of 1938, he went off board to settle in Meldorf, Holstein. There he continued his work as a free writer. His most successful books were published during the 1930s and 1940s. Several of his books were also printed for army postal service of German Wehrmacht (army and navy) during World War II.

Luserke cannot be described as toeing the Nazi party line. Instead, his ideal and book topics were in some extent similar to Völkisch movement. His literary work was mostly fiction with a revival of Norse mythology, Breton legends and Continental Germanic mythology so it contains no Nazi propaganda. Nevertheless, it matched some popular Völkisch and Nazi topics which was convenient during dictatorship to get accepted as a professional writer.

Between 1947 and 1952, he got a teaching assignment at Meldorfer Gelehrtenschule (founded in 1540) where he introduced his community theatre again. There he named his fully developed play as Meldorfer Spielweise which he characterized as a special style of community theatre. From the start all participants are involved in the play's development. Actors, musicians, handcrafter and technicians are part of a team which composes, writes poetry and thinks about elements like dance, singing, period costumes, signs and symbolism, technical effects. Along the way Luserke's most appreciated activities helped to save the school's survival which was endangered after WWII.

Luserke also held advanced training courses for youth group leaders at Jugendgruppenleiterschule in Bad Harzburg-Bündheim. In 1955 he completed his late work about his Shakespeare studies Pan-Apollon-Prospero which got published in 1957. He died in the age of 88 and got buried in Hage, East Frisia, next to his wife Annemarie.

In 2018 his descendants abandoned his grave. However, his gravestone was brought to the East Frisian island of Juist in the North Sea and placed there in the cemetery on the island in 2019.

== Awards and distinctions ==
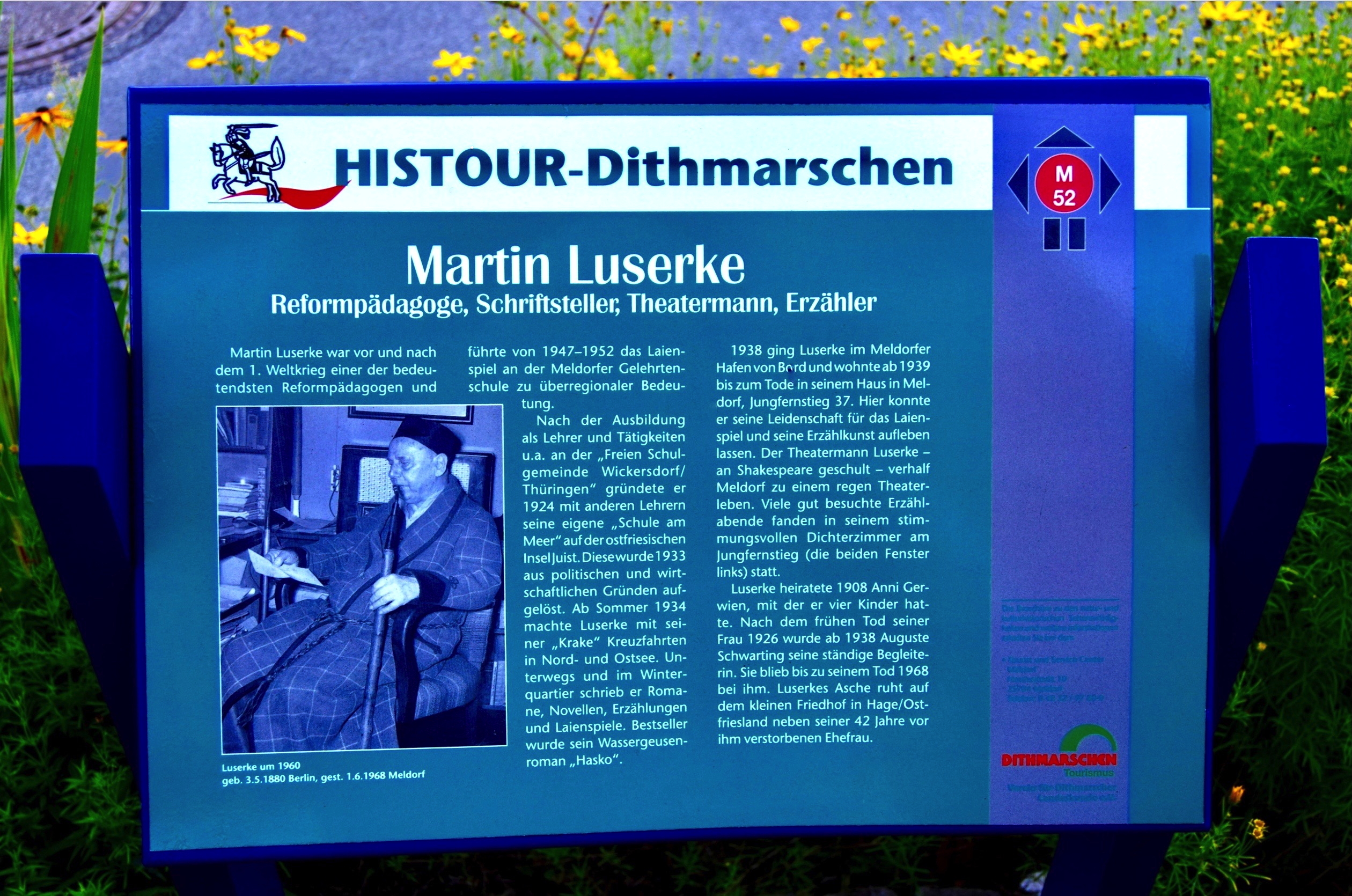
Commemorative plaque next to Luserke's former home in Meldorf, Holstein

- 1935 – 1st Prize of Literaturpreis der Reichshauptstadt Berlin (= Literature Award of Reich capital Berlin) for the novel Hasko (published in German, Dutch and French)
- 1950 – Honorary Member of Schleswig-Holstein writer's assembly
- 1954 – Order of Merit of the Federal Republic of Germany for his community theatre work
- 1958 – Friedrich Hebbel Award
- 1960 – Golden Medal awarded by University of Kiel
- 1986 – As a permanent loan the state library of Kiel gave Luserke's furnishings to Heimatverein Juist. Since then it is exhibited in Sibje House on Juist Island.
- 1987 – On 4 May a commemorative plaque was attached to his home at 37, Jungfernstieg in Meldorf
- 2010 – Next to his home at 37, Jungfernstieg in Meldorf a new commemorative plaque was installed

== Literature ==
- Martin Kiessig: Martin Luserke. Gestalt und Werk. Versuch einer Wesensdeutung. Dissertation Universität Leipzig 1936. OCLC 632234871
- Winfried Mogge (1987). "Luserke, Martin". Neue Deutsche Biographie (in German). Vol. 15. Berlin: Duncker & Humblot. pp. 533–534. (full text online).
- M. von Kellenbach: Der Mensch in der Dichtung des Dritten Reiches (Hasko). Phil. Diss. 1939.
- Hans-Windekilde Jannasch: Martin Luserke zum 70. Geburtstag. Sammlung, 1 January 1950, Vol. 5, p. 377.
- "Martin Luserke 75 Jahre alt". In: Bildung und Erziehung, 1955, Ausg. 8, Böhlau Verlag 1955, p. 299.
- Walter Jantzen: "50 Jahre Laienspiel – Gottfried Haaß-Berkow, Martin Luserke, Rudolf Mirbt". In: Bildung und Erziehung 1956, Vol. 9, Böhlau-Verlag, Wien, Weimar 1956, pp. 245–256.
- Jean Nordhaus: The Laienspiel Movement and Brecht's Lehrstuecke. Phil. Diss. 1969.
- Franz L. Pelgen: Das Laienspiel und die Spielweise Martin Luserkes. Dissertation Universität München, Philosophische Fakultät, München 1957.
- Herbert Giffei: "Luserke, Martin". In: Schleswig-holsteinisches biographisches Lexikon, 1971, pp. 193–195.
- Anneliese Knoop: "Martin Luserke" In: Lexikon der Kinder- und Jugendliteratur, Vol. 2 I–O, Klaus Doderer (Hrsg.), Beltz, Weinheim/Pullach/Basel 1977.
- Herbert Giffei: Martin Luserke und das Theater. Landesarbeitsgemeinschaft für Spiel und Amateurtheater in Nordrhein-Westfalen (Hrsg.), Vol. 18, Hilfen für Spielleiter. Doepgen, Bergheim 1979.
- Kurt Sydow: "Die Lebensfahrt eines großen Erzählers – Martin Luserke (1880–1968)". In: Jahrbuch des Archivs der deutschen Jugendbewegung 12, 1980.
- Herbert Giffei: Martin Luserke – Ein Wegbereiter der modernen Erlebnispädagogik. In: Wegbereiter der modernen Erlebnispädagogik, Vol. 6. Klaus Neubauer Verlag, Lüneburg 1987.
- Cornelia Susanne Anna Godde: Das Laienspiel als reformpädagogisches Element. Die Bedeutung Martin Luserkes für das heutige Bildungswesen (= Beiträge zu Erziehungswissenschaften, Vol. 3). Dissertation Universität Bonn. Wehle, Witterschlick / Bonn 1990, ISBN 3-925267-38-7.
- Jörg W. Ziegenspeck (Ed.): Martin Luserke. Reformpädagoge – Dichter – Theatermann; Gründer und Leiter der "Schule am Meer" auf der Nordseeinsel Juist (1925–1934) (= Wegbereiter der modernen Erlebnispädagogik, Band 6). Neubauer, Lüneburg 1990, ISBN 3-88456-072-7.
- Brigitte Cléac'h: Martin Luserke und die Bretagne: Anfang einer Reise zur Sage auf der Insel Molène im Jahre 1905, Dissertation Université de Bretagne Occidentale, Mémoire de Maîtrise, Brest 1991. OCLC 838761494
- Nicole Becker: Reformpädagogik in der Weser-Ems-Region: das Beispiel „Haus am Meer“ von Martin Luserke Dissertation Universität Oldenburg 1993. OCLC 25681322
- Ulrich Schwerdt: Martin Luserke (1880–1968). Reformpädagogik im Spannungsfeld von pädagogischer Innovation und kulturkritischer Ideologie. Eine biographische Rekonstruktion (= Studien zur Bildungsreform, Vol. 23). Dissertation Universität Paderborn 1992. Lang, Frankfurt am Main u.a. 1993. ISBN 3-631-46119-4.
- Otto Seydel: "Das Echo: Die Geschichte der Vision einer 'Neuen Schule'". In: Bildung und Erziehung, 1994, Vol. 47(2). ISSN 0006-2456, pp. 175–186.
- Jürgen Oelkers: Eros und Lichtgestalten: Die Gurus der Landerziehungsheime (PDF file; 242 KB)
- Gunther Nickel / Johanna Schrön (Ed.), Carl Zuckmayer: Geheimreport. Wallstein-Verlag, Göttingen 2002. ISBN 978-3-89244-599-9.
- Albrecht Sauer: Martin Luserke. Reihe: The Oxford Encyclopedia of Maritime History. Oxford University Press, 2007. ISBN 978-0195130751.
- "Luserke, Martin". In: Horn, Klaus-Peter / Kemnitz, Heidemarie / Marotzki, Winfried / Sandfuchs, Uwe (Ed.): Klinkhardt Lexikon Erziehungswissenschaft (KLE). Bad Heilbrunn 2012.
