= Bieberstein Palace, Hesse =

Coordinates: 50°34′24″N 9°51′4″E

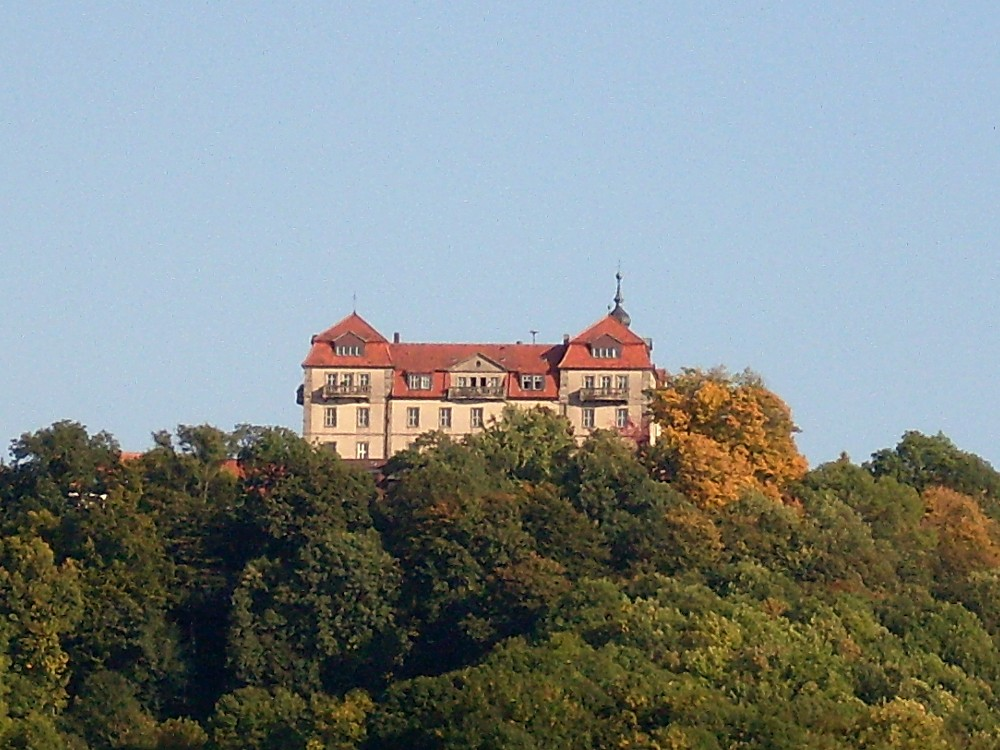
View of Bieberstein Palace from Langenbieber

Bieberstein Palace (Schloss Bieberstein) is a baroque palace that was built between 1710 and 1740 by Bamberg architect, Johann Dientzenhofer. It is located in the parish of Hofbieber, which is part of Langenbieber, and about 2 km south of Hofbieber on the hill of the Kugelberg (505.1 m above NN), a southern spur of the Hessenliede (517.7 m above NN). South of the Kugelberg the terrain descends into the valley of the Bieber. The palace is about 16 km east of Fulda, the county town.

== History ==
=== Hermann-Lietz-Schule ===
In 1904 Hermann Lietz bought the castle and repurposed it as a Landerziehungsheim (engl. German rural boarding school) in the style of his Reformpädagogik (engl. New Education Movement). He managed to defend his project against various hostilities, especially those of the Catholic Church in Fulda. Until today, Bieberstein Castle is the location of the Hermann-Lietz-Schulen high school. Around 88 girls and boys are supervised by 25 teachers and 25 other professionals.

In the years 1908 and 1966 two large fires destroyed parts of the castle. After the devastating fire in 1908 an entire upper floor with towers and balconies was added. On the 29th of November 1966 another fire damaged the attic, which was promptly rebuilt. The big balconies on the east side of the castle were also added, even though it went against the castle's original architectural style.

Today the "Lietz Internat Schloss Bieberstein" of the "Stiftung Deutsche Landerziehungsheime" is still located within the castle.

== Literature ==
- Rudolf Knappe: Mittelalterliche Burgen in Hessen. 800 Burgen, Burgruinen und Burgstätten. 3. Auflage. Wartberg-Verlag, Gudensberg-Gleichen 2000, ISBN 3-86134-228-6, S. 204.
- Alex Zollmann: 800 Jahre Bieberstein. In: Hofbieber 1093–2003. Aus der Geschichte eines Dorfes. Arbeitskreis 'Chronik' Hofbieber, Nüsttal-Hofaschenbach 2003, S. 170–177.
- Dieter Leuthold: Der Kampf gegen die „modernen Heiden“. Hermann Lietz und die Gründung des Landerziehungsheims Schloß Bieberstein im Jahre 1904. – Fulda: Leben und Arbeit (Zs. der Hermann Lietz-Schule) 1969
- Rolf Müller (Hrsg.): Schlösser, Burgen, alte Mauern. Herausgegeben vom Hessendienst der Staatskanzlei, Wiesbaden 1990, ISBN 3-89214-017-0, S. 184.
