= Krake ZK 14 =

Dutch-German sailing ship

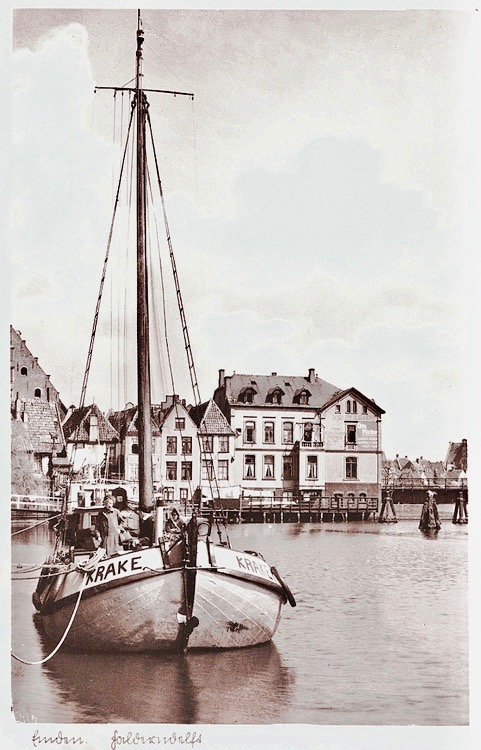
- Krake, 1934–1938

History

Dutch Republic (1911–1934)
- Name: Ebenhaëzer
- Namesake: Eben-Ezer
- Owner: Betto and Maarten Bolt
- Operator: do.
- Port of registry: Zoutkamp, Netherlands
- Route: North Sea, Wadden Sea, Lauwersmeer
- Home port: Zoutkamp, Netherlands
- Identification: ZK 14 (ex ZK 74)
- Fate: sold to Germany, 25 February 1934
- Status: commercial fishery vessel

(Germany) (1934–1935)
- Owner: Martin Luserke
- Operator: do.
- Acquired: 25 February 1934
- Renamed: Krake
- Refit: restoration, new superstructures (wheel house, elevated cabin roof on foredeck), new engine
- Home port: Juist, (Germany) (until August 1934)
- Identification: ZK 14, call signal DGJC
- Status: floating poet's workshop

Germany (1935–1944)
- Name: Krake
- Owner: Martin Luserke
- Operator: do.
- Home port: Emden, Germany
- Identification: ZK 14
- Fate: destroyed by Allied bomb, 18 June 1944, Hamburg-Finkenwerder wharf

General characteristics
- Class & type: Wadden sailer
- Type: Blazer
- Length: LOD 11 m (36 ft), LOA approx. 16 m (52 ft)
- Beam: 4 m (13 ft)
- Height: 13 m (43 ft) at main mast
- Draught: 0.5–0.8 m (1 ft 8 in – 2 ft 7 in)
- Installed power: 2-cylinder Deutz MDO engine
- Propulsion: 16–20 hp (12–15 kW) auxiliary engine
- Sail plan: 80 m^{2} (860 sq ft) sail area
- Speed: 6 kn = 11 km/h

Krake was a Dutch sailing ship with the identifier ZK 14. It was bought by the German progressive pedagogue, bard and writer Martin Luserke. The former fishery vessel was deployed as his floating poet's workshop. It cruised the shallow coastal regions of The Netherlands, (Germany), Denmark, Southern Norway and Southern Sweden as well as channels and rivers between North Sea and Baltic Sea. In harbours it was visited by a larger quantity of mostly younger people who attended readings and taletellings. Krake became very well-known during 1934 and 1938 and still is a topic in German literature, scientific literature, local museums, libraries, archives, encyclopaedias, and lectures. One of its later well-known visitors was German pilot Beate Uhse.

== History ==
=== Ebenhaëzer ZK 14 (ex ZK 74) ===
The Dutch fishery vessel Ebenhaëzer with the identifier ZK 14 (ex ZK 74) was formerly owned by Betto and Maarten Bolt of Zoutkamp, The Netherlands. The ship's original name referred to Eben-Ezer. Between 1911 and 1934 the open Blazer was used to trawl fish, especially mussels, plaice, prawn and some herring. The ship's early history is not documented in its port of registry or home port. When Luserke bought the ship on 25 February 1934 it had reportedly been laid up for a long time. Despite its construction of solid oak the ship was unkempt and already in a rather shabby condition. On its four-day-conversion tour to East Frisia in Northern Germany the cabin under deck broke down.

=== Krake ZK 14 ===
Luserke renamed the ship Krake (= octopus), inspired by many stone jars (in old German language called Kruke) he found aboard. Similarly, the ship's pet parakeet's name was named Kraki, which is a diminutive of Krake, later modified to Karaki.

On wharf in Oldersum, East Frisia, the Blazer ZK 14 was completely restored, renovated and newly developed with superstructures like a wheel house and an elevated cabin roof on its foredeck to gain a bit more headroom for its crew and guests under deck. The vessel also got a new 2-cylinder Deutz engine. The ship's former identifier ZK 14 was inherited on its gaff sail while the identification on both sides of its bow was overwritten by its new name Krake. The vessel was partly painted white but its flat floor plate was painted in black. Any metal panelling was silvery.

On Sunday, 15 July 1934, the ship was ready for the maiden voyage with its all-new engine. Martin Luserke and his fifteen-year-old son Dieter (1918–2005) boarded in Oldersum and went back to their home on the island Juist, which is one of the sandbanks which delimit the Wadden Sea. Dieter had been sailing since the age of six, and already had basic sailing skills. In September 1934 Luserke registered his ship in Emden, East Frisia, which became the ship's new home port. Its registration shows an incorrect typification as a Tjalk. The reason for it might be the ship's modification with superstructures which a Blazer typically lacks. However, Blazer and Tjalk are still not identical.

Martin Luserke was dedicated to the fine arts but also possessed a hands-on mentality. In 1906 he was co-founder of Freie Schulgemeinde Wickersdorf ("Free School Community of Wickersdorf") in Thuringia and in 1925 had founded Schule am Meer ("School by the Sea") on Juist Island, both progressive boarding schools, the latter with the motto education by sea. He enabled his pupils to learn about sailing with the school's own sail boats (dinghy cruisers) or to signal using the flag alphabet. One of his educational goals was to encourage his pupils to develop earthiness, comradeship and a sense of team responsibility, leading to an autonomous personality. The latter turned out to be incompatible with Nazism. (See Volksgemeinschaft)

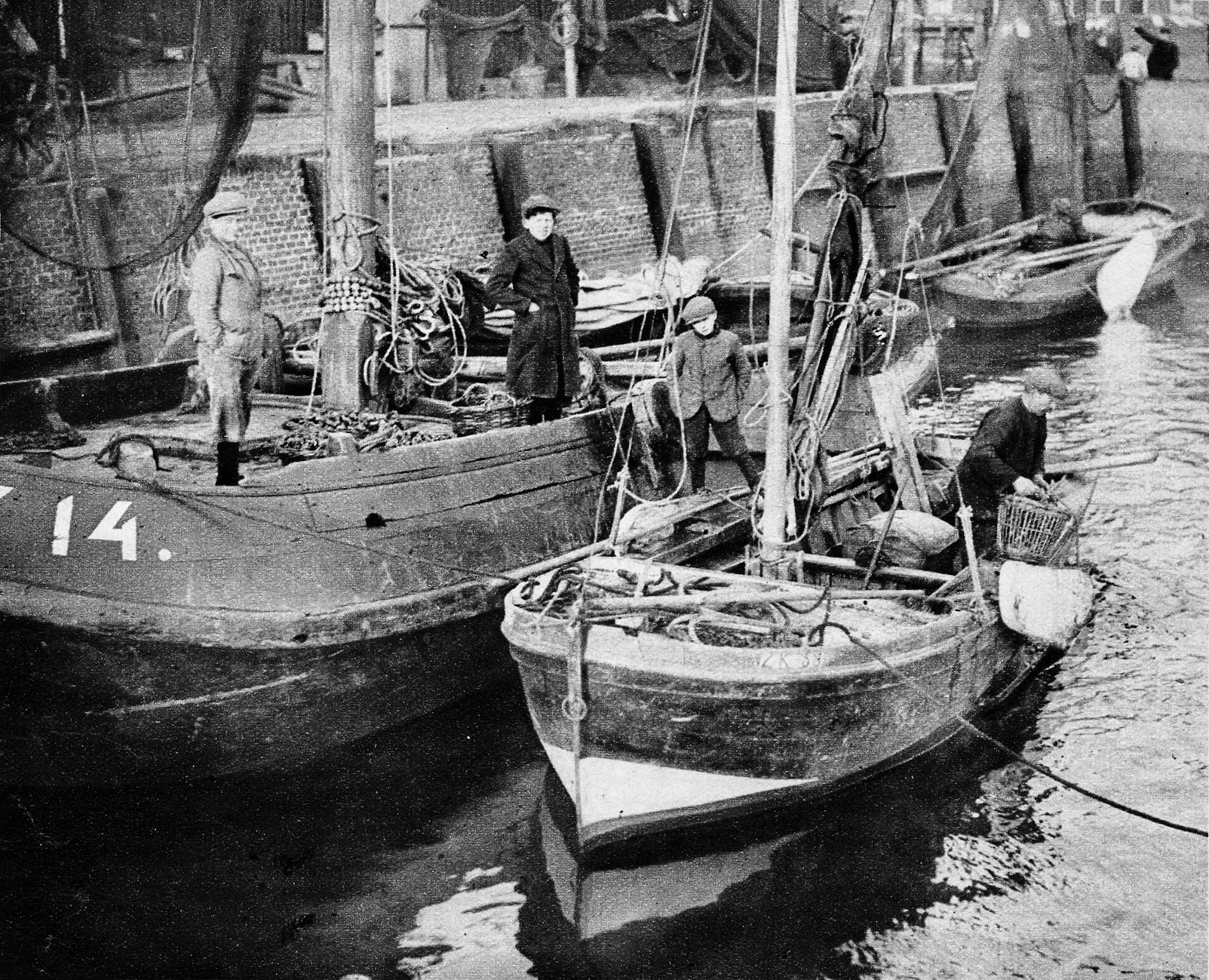
ZK 14 (left) in its former state, deployed by Dutch fishermen, in the harbour of Zoutkamp, The Netherlands

In spring 1934 Luserke's school had to close against the background of "Gleichschaltung" (Nazification) and Antisemitism. Martin's wife Annemarie had died in 1926, so he asked the youngest of his four children if he wanted to follow him at sea. With a talented teacher as father his son Dieter felt he could easily quit school.

To prepare, his son went aboard the 100-ton-sailship "Ostfriesland" (East Frisia) which anchored near Juist at that time, until July 1934. In 1931 his father had already completed a mate's certificate in Leer, East Frisia. Until August 1934 father and son both used Juist as their home port whilst school matters had to be cleared.

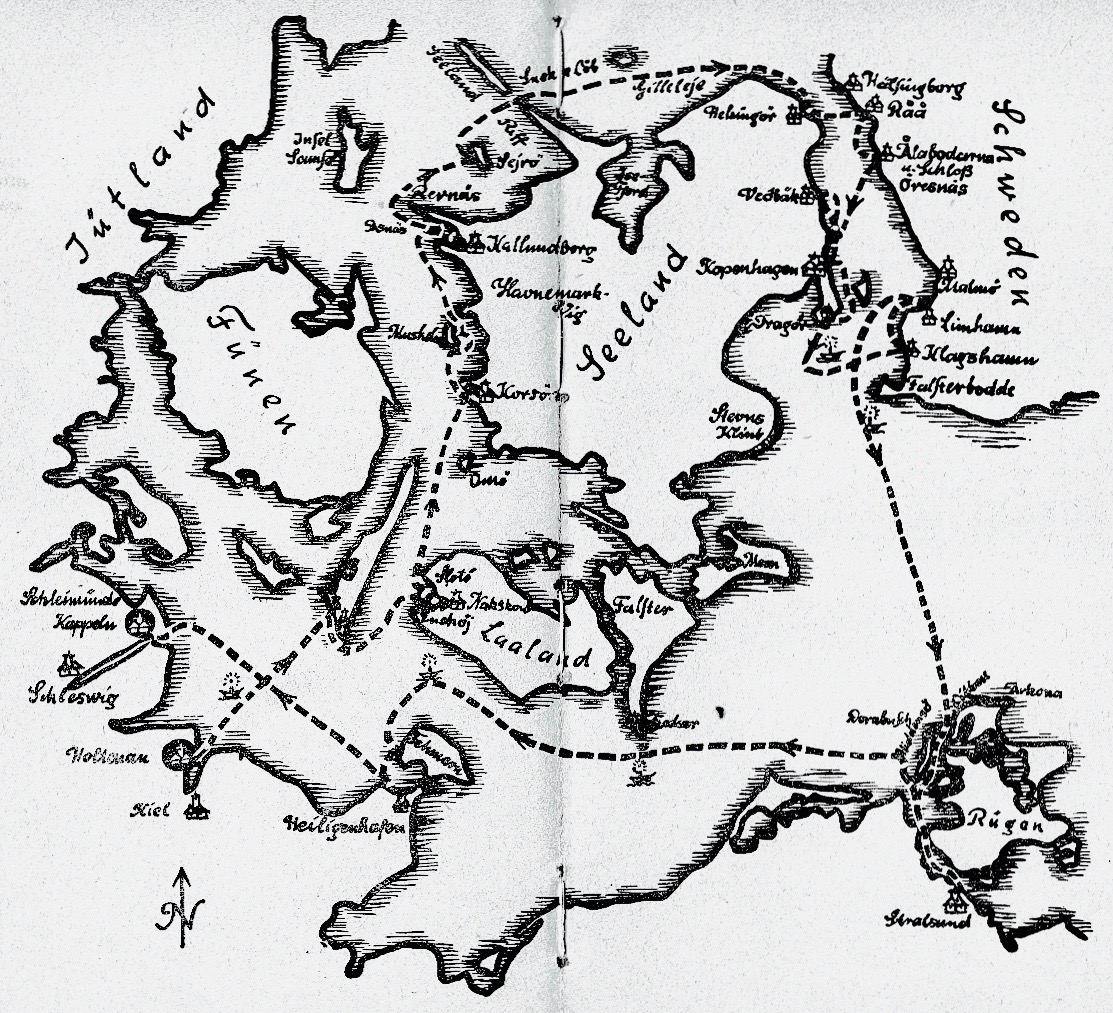
Luserkes 4th Denmark trip route in 1936 starting in Kiel-Holtenau circling Zealand (Copenhagen) and passing Hiddensee, Rügen, Stralsund harbour, Fehmarn, Heiligenhafen to its destination Kappeln

Later their trips with Krake went from the Dutch West Frisian Islands along the German East Frisian Islands and North Frisian Islands to Denmark, Norway, Sweden and the German islands in the Baltic Sea like Fehmarn, Hiddensee and Rügen, through Dutch, German and Danish channels, rivers and lakes like Lake Schwerin where they once spent the winter.

Krake became well-known in the harbours since the ship was neither used for commercial fishery nor for cargo which was rather uncommon at that time of economic uncertainty. Younger people especially felt attracted to the readings and tale-telling aboard Krake. Luserke's stories developed with each telling, adapting according to listeners' reactions, and were finally written down. He had a typewriter and a small book inventory aboard.

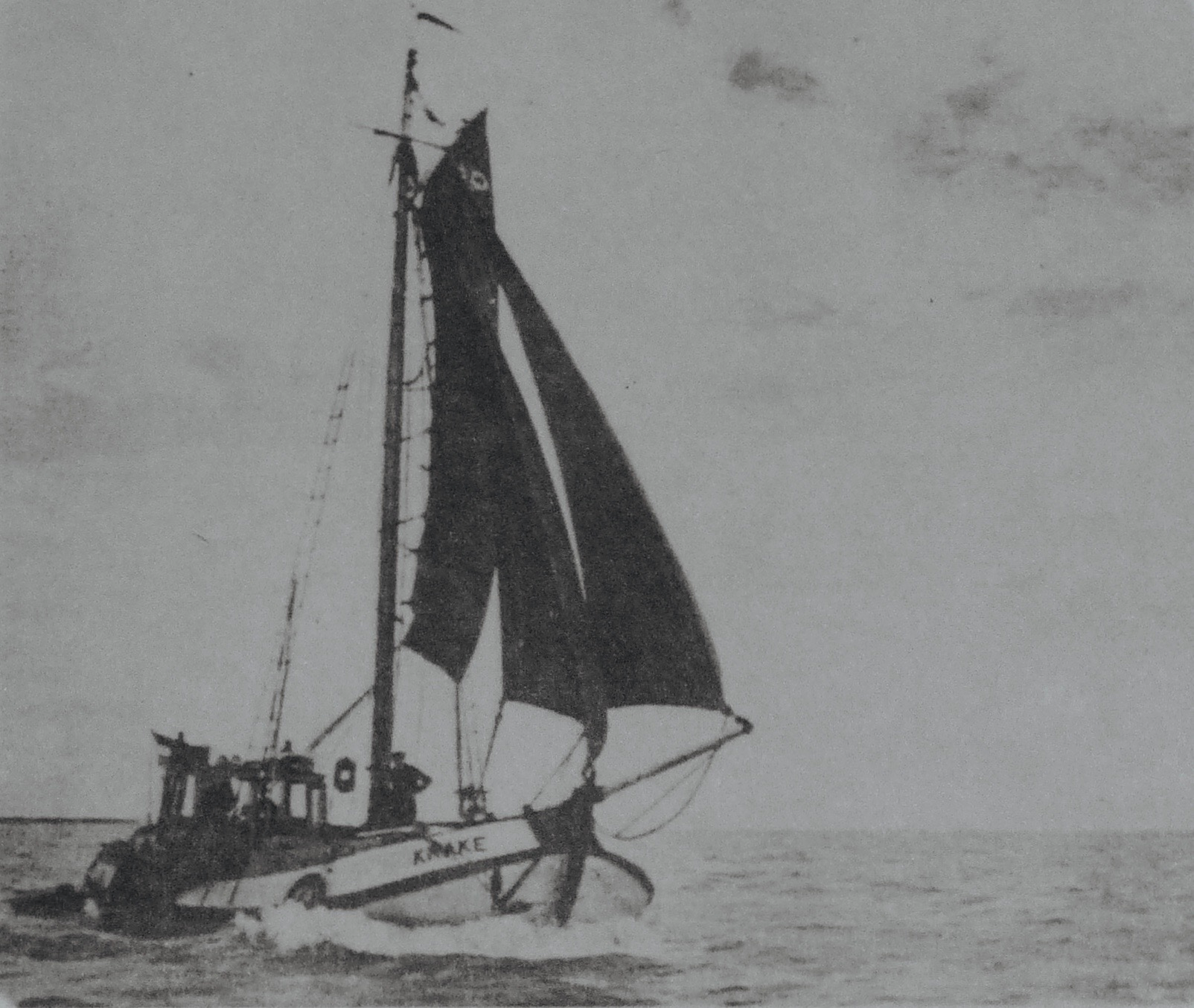
Martin Luserke aboard Krake

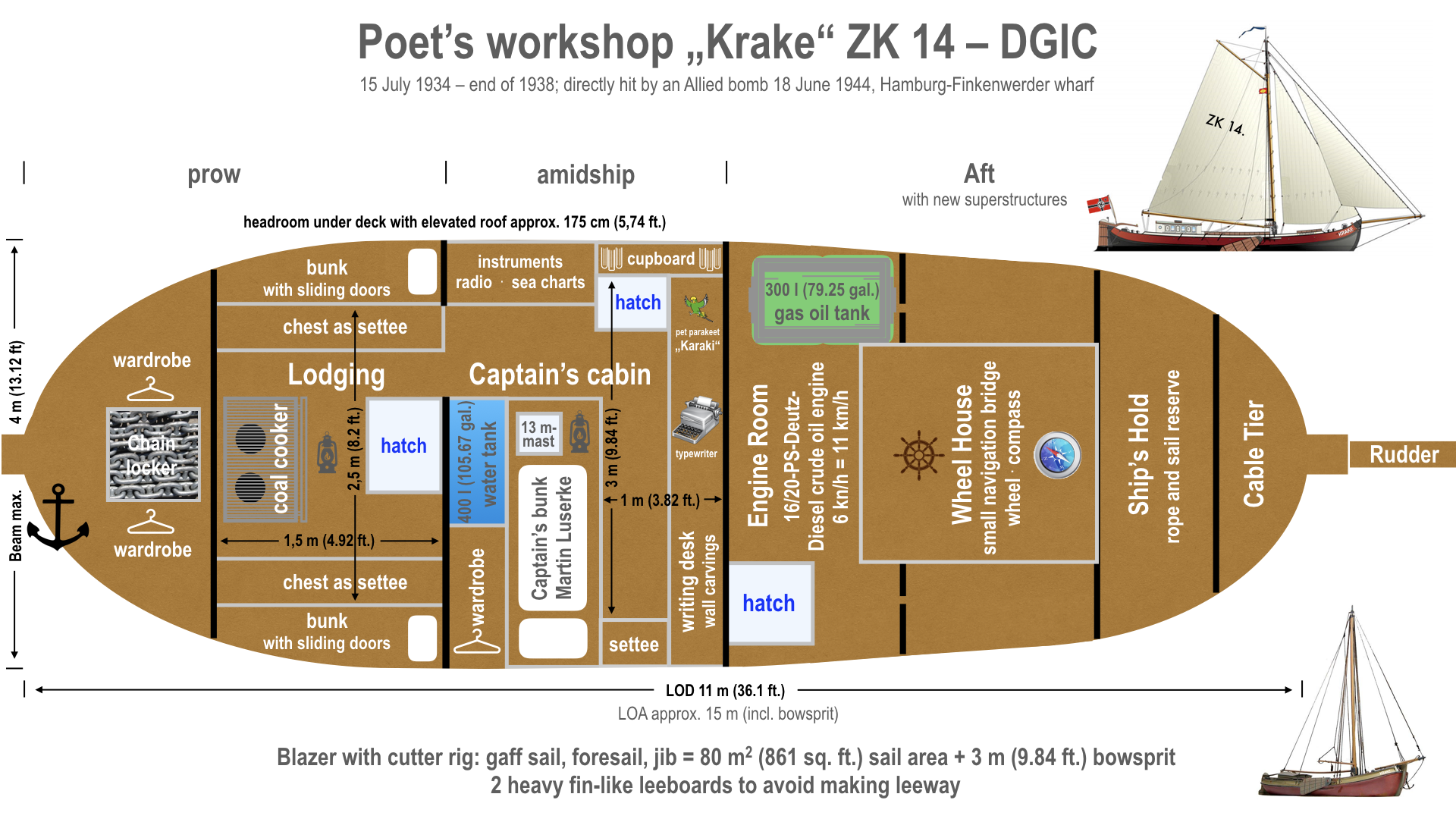
Sketch based on a drawing from 1936/37

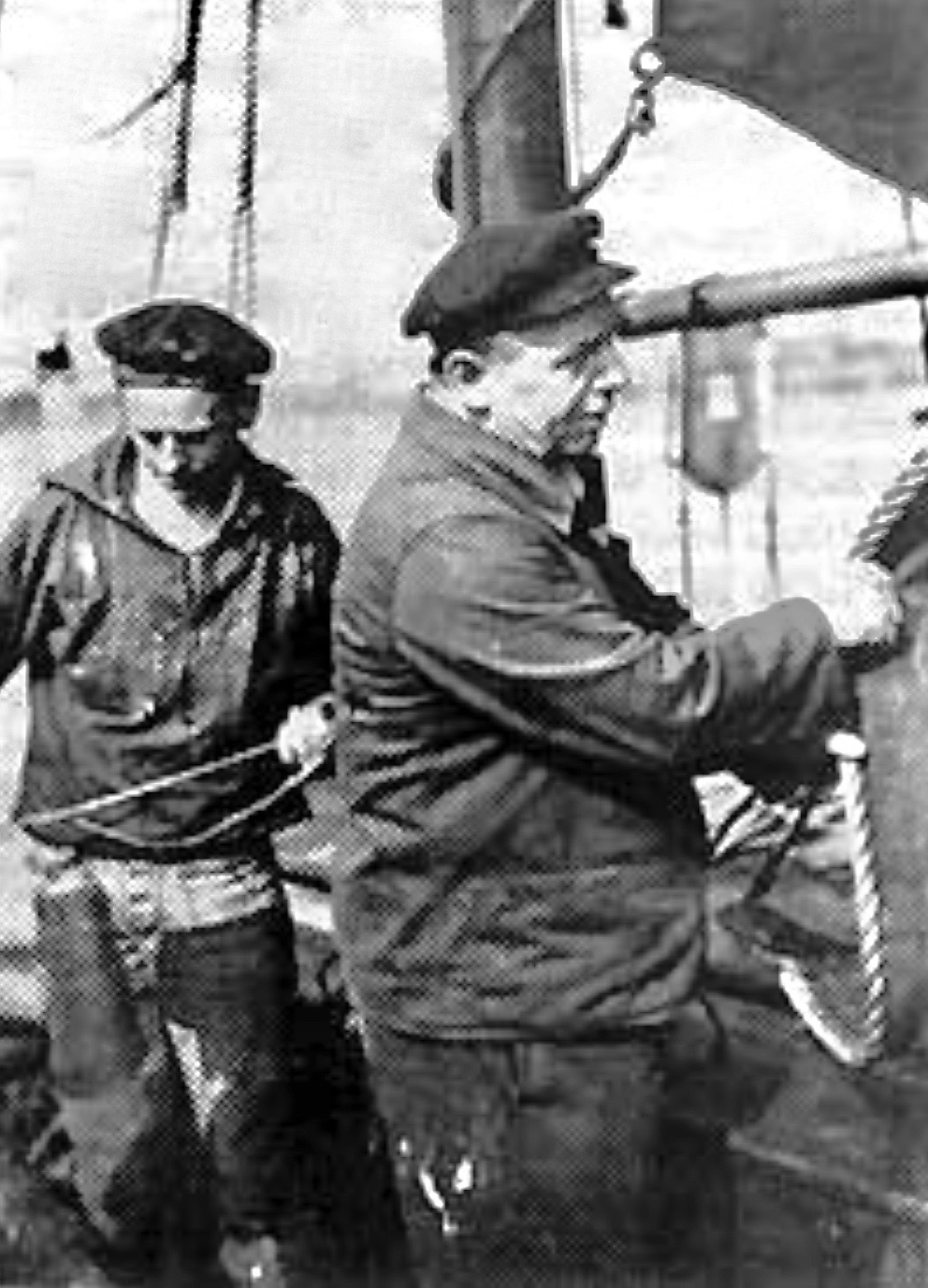
Dieter and Martin Luserke aboard Krake

Another reason for the ship's reputation depicted an unusual decoration of its inner cabin walls. Harbourmasters and Customs officers who had to inspect the ship worked up curiosity for those strange figurative to symbolical carvings. Luserke created them during his time as POW in France between 1917 and 1918. They added to the theatrical effects of Luserke's taletelling and readings in a similar way than harsh weather conditions or the pounding of the waves against the ship's body. Luserke's use of ancient Norse and Breton myths and legends as well as dramatic ghost and Klabautermann stories from the coast provoked a certain thrill. The prestigious writer Carl Zuckmayer who felt an antipathy for him, regarded Luserke as "of extensive phantasy, originality, capability at the highest stage" with a tremendous talent "of artistics, especially theatric".

His former pupils from Thuringia and Juist Island as well as teacher colleagues came aboard but also unknown guests like hitchhikers who attended the ship for free trips. Luserke integrated them in the daily work aboard which revealed his pedagogic background. One of his young guests aboard who later became well-known was Beate Uhse. In her memoirs she wrote about Luserke as her most favourite teacher characterizing him as "appreciative", "generous" and "full of wit".

The city of Emden fascinated Luserke, so there he rented a flat for himself and his son to hibernate. He explored the city's library and archive for his historical research. Several of Luserke's books were written in Emden and its Falderndelft harbour, which went on became bestsellers during the 1930s and 1940s. In 1935 Luserke was awarded with Literaturpreis der Reichshauptstadt Berlin for his novel Hasko which reflects two historic sea battles of the Dutch Watergeuzen near Ameland Island and Emden. The press became interested when in 1935 an Austrian press photographer came aboard for a home story.

Luserke developed a very special relation to his fictional book Obadjah and the ZK 14 which incorporates his ship and those many empty stone jars originally meant for hard liquor which he had found aboard. Despite the Antisemitism of that time the name of his character Obadjah (Hebrew עובדיה) as fictional former ship-owner originates from the major-domo of Jewish king Ahab. Obadjah is also a tenor soloist role in Felix Mendelssohn's oratorio Elijah, Op. 70, MWV A 25 so any Nazi with knowledge of classical music would have been able to recognize this connection. Some of Luserke's other books also include the ship and his own impressions.

At the end of 1938 Luserke had to stop his trips due to foreign currency shortage of German Reich which led to a blocking of operating fluids and supplies for private vessels. He went off board with rheumatic disorder and later settled in Meldorf, Holstein, where he continued his tale-tellings, writings and community theatre successfully.

On 18 June 1944 Krake was completely destroyed when an Allied bomb struck the wharf in Hamburg-Finkenwerder.

== Literature ==
- Martin Kiessig: Die alte ZK 14. Zu Besuch auf einer schwimmenden Dichterwerkstatt, in: Martin Luserke. Gestalt und Werk. Versuch einer Wesensdeutung. Philosophical doctor's thesis, University of Leipzig, J. Särchen Verlag, Baruth/Mark 1936.
- Martin Luserke: Logbücher der Krake, 1934–1939.
- idem: Der Teufel unter der ZK 14 as part of the anthology Der kleine Schühss – Ein Buch von der Wattenküste, incl. drawings by Karl Stratil (1894–1963). Rolf Italiaander (1913–1991) (Ed.), epilogue by Martin Kiessig (1907–1994). Verlag Gustav Weise, Leipzig 1935.
- idem: Obadjah und die ZK 14 oder Die fröhlichen Abenteuer eines Hexenmeisters. Ludwig-Voggenreiter-Verlag, Potsdam 1936.
- idem: Krake kreuzt im Nordmeer – Logbuch 1937, incl. drawings by Willy Thomsen. Verlag Philipp Reclam jun., Leipzig 1937.
- idem: Das Logbuch der Krake, incl. drawings by Dieter Evers. Ludwig-Voggenreiter-Verlag, Potsdam 1937. (new edition: ISBN 978-7-00-005031-0)
