= Hasko =

Novel by Martin Luserke

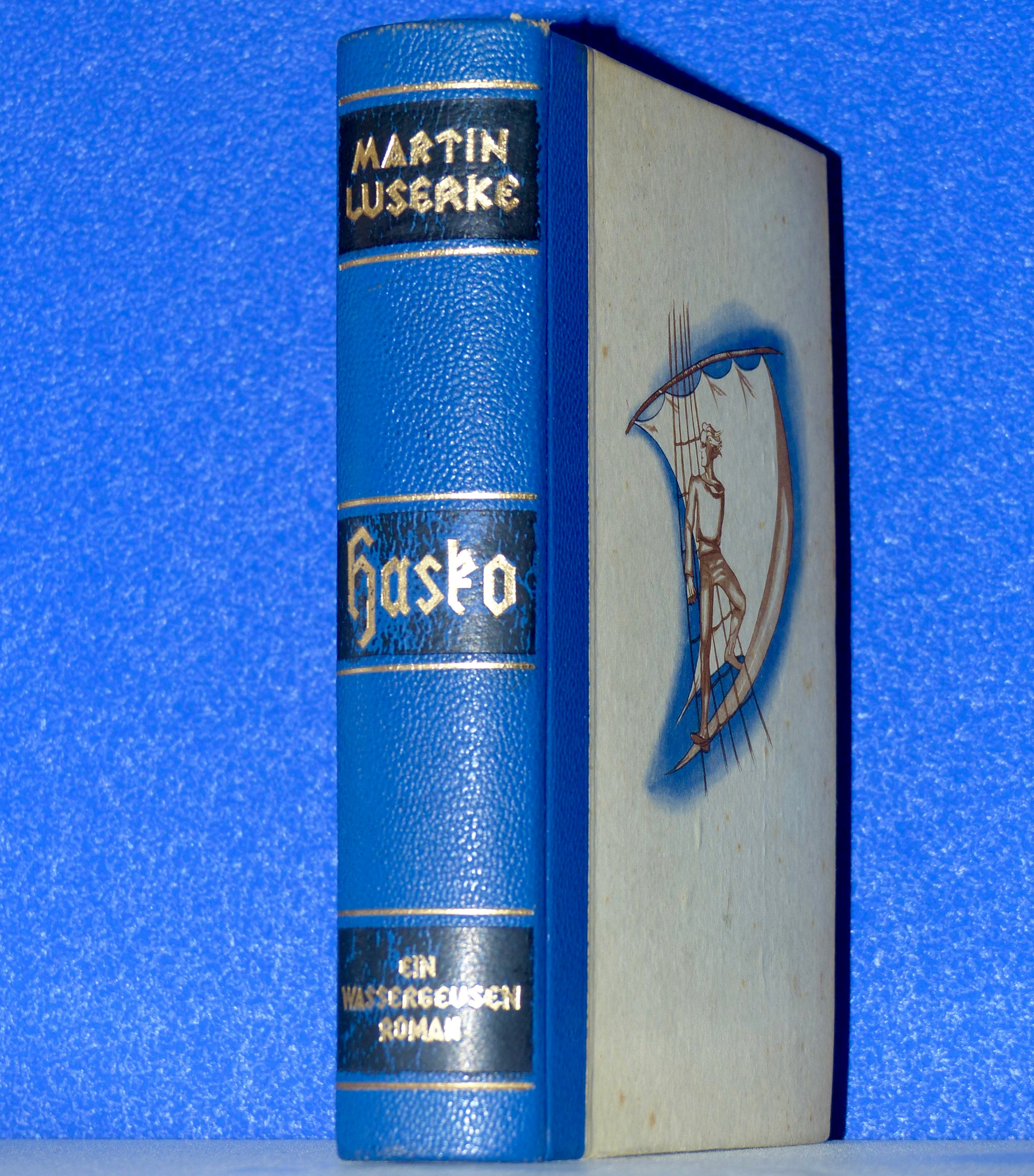
Hasko edition from 1939

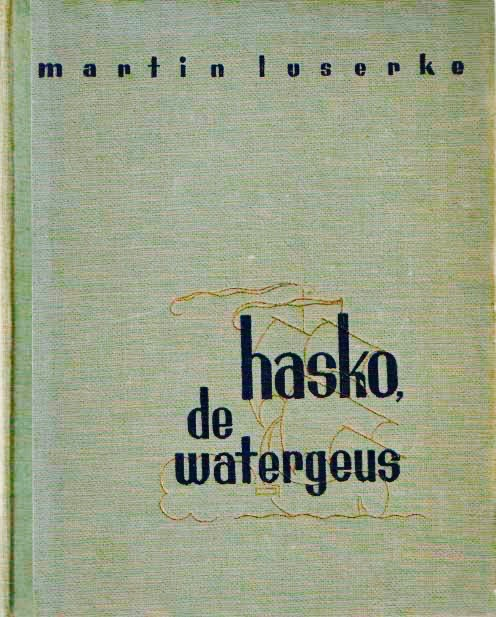
Dutch edition Hasko, de watergeus, 3rd edition from 1940

Hasko is the title of the most successful novel of German pedagogue, bard, theatre maker and writer Martin Luserke. It is published in German, Dutch and French language.

The novel is about a Dutch freedom fighter, one of the Watergeuzen who got a letter of marque to board ships of other nations. During the Eighty Years' War (1568–1648) between Spain and The Netherlands the fictional character got involved into a battle for the East Frisian city of Emden in North Sea and another battle near the West Frisian island Ameland. At that time the image of the Watergeuzen changed from buccaneers to freedom fighters officially acknowledged by William I, Prince of Orange (1533–1584).

The novel was created nearly entirely aboard Luserke's ship Krake in Falderndelft harbour of Emden. The book contains historic maps of both sea battles and detailed drawings of the ship types involved which the Geuzen had used.

The novel was awarded in 1935 with the 1st prize of Literaturpreis der Reichshauptstadt Berlin. The novel was published simultaneously by Franz-Eher-Verlag of Munich and Ludwig-Voggenreiter-Verlag of Potsdam.

During World War II a part of the edition by Voggenreiter was published with the remark Einmalige Sonderausgabe der Zentrale der Frontbuchhandlungen Paris (= singular special edition of head office of front libraries in Paris). It was printed by Imprimerie Chaim in Paris, France. These book editions were meant for soldiers of German Wehrmacht and got published in a special format to fit army postal service regulations.

The book was lastly reissued in 1989.

A predecessor of the novel was named Hasko wird Geusenkapitän (= Hasko becomes Geuzen captain) and was already published in 1925.
