= Wickersdorf Free School Community =

German school

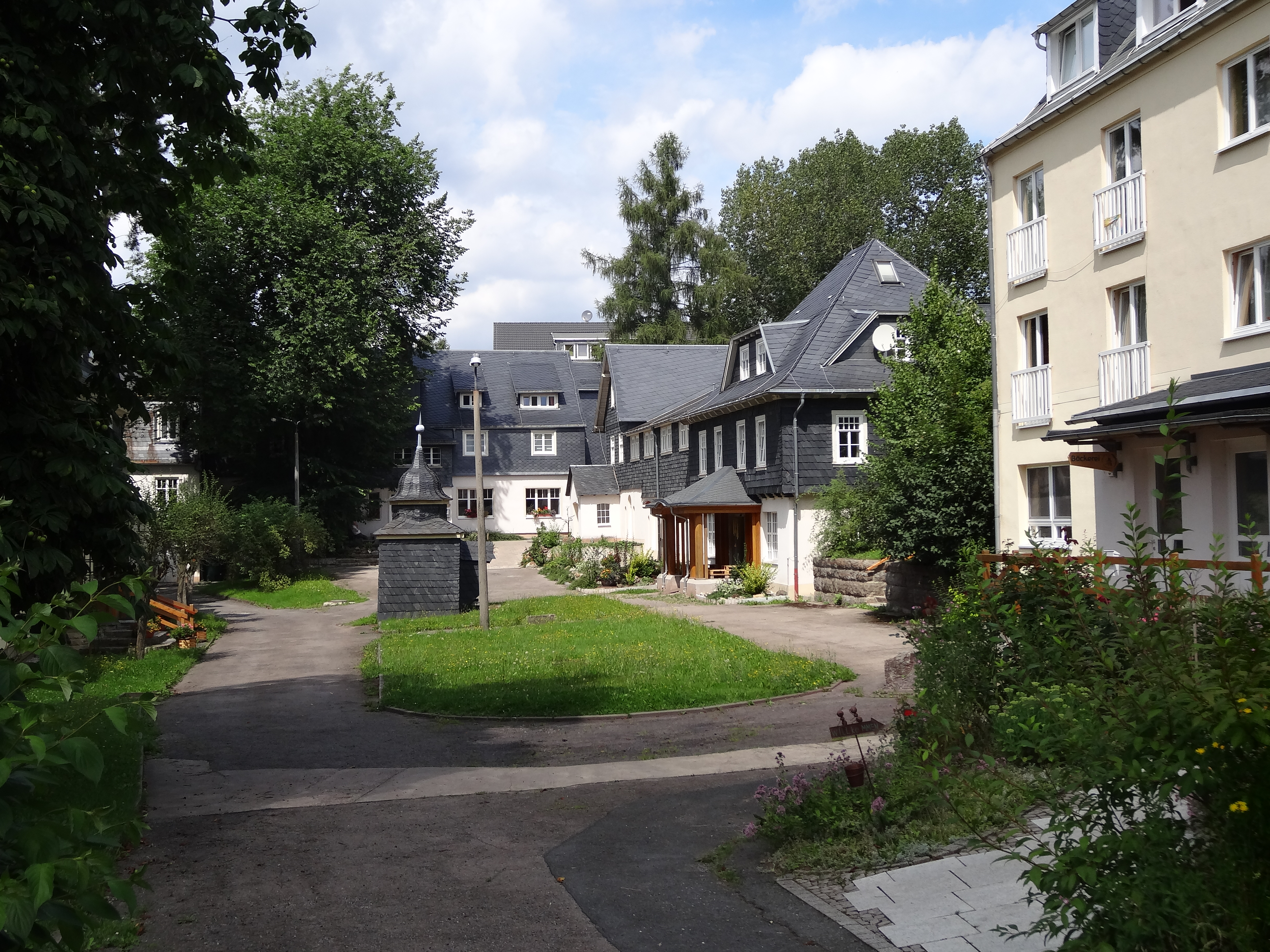
The defunct school, pictured in 2014

The Wickersdorf Free School Community (German: Freie Schulgemeinde Wickersdorf) was a progressive school in Germany, founded by Gustav Wyneken and Paul Geheeb in 1906.

In particular, the concept of "movement play" on the school stage can be understood as the original contribution of the Freie Schulgemeinde to a school culture of movement and physical culture, which continues to have an impact on the subject of performing play today. This concept, which goes back to Martin Luserke, was both theoretically elaborated and practically tested by him over decades.

== Pedagogy ==
German pedagogues Gustav Wyneken and Paul Geheeb founded the German: Freie Schulgemeinde in Wickersdorf in September 1906. Wyneken, who had previously taught at a Hermann Lietz school, modelled Wickersdorf on his experimental, neo-Idealist ideas: to treat children as distinct from adults, to pique natural curiosity, to let the child's natural abilities appear gradually, to teach through experience rather than academics. Unlike other experimental schools, Wickersdorf focused on humanities, centring the school on finding the "objective spirit" in philosophy, literature, and music.

== Legacy ==
Music theorist Ernst Kurth's year as Wickersdorf's head music instructor was a pivotal moment in his life, with the influence of August Halm and Wyneken.

Wickersdorf co-founder Martin Luserke continued on to found Schule am Meer in 1925, and Wickersdorf teacher Bernhard Uffrecht continued to found another school in 1919, both with music pedagogy they had learned from August Halm at Wickersdorf.

== See also ==
- Alexander Schwab
- Ulrich Becher
- Hans Hess (museologist)
- Hedda Korsch
- Peter Suhrkamp
- Otto Braun (poet)

== Bibliography ==
- Rothfarb, Lee A., ed. (1991). Ernst Kurth: Selected Writings. Cambridge University Press. ISBN 978-0-521-35522-3.
