= Siegfried Bernfeld =

Austrian psychologist and educator (1892–1953)

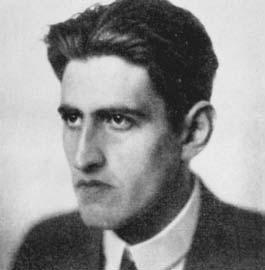
Siegfried Bernfeld

Siegfried Bernfeld (Austrian German: [ˈbɛrnfɛld]; May 7, 1892, Lemberg, Galicia, Austria-Hungary (today Ukraine) – April 2, 1953, San Francisco) was an Austrian psychologist and educator.

== Biography ==
In 1915, he completed his Ph.D. in philosophy at the University of Vienna, where he also studied psychoanalysis, sociology, education, and biology.

Siegfried Bernfeld was of Jewish ancestry. While still a student, he was involved in the psychoanalytical movement, and later became an important member of the Vienna Psychoanalytic Society.

During the First World War, when Vienna became home to over 100,000 refugees, many of them Jews from Galicia, Bernfeld became interested in developing new forms of Jewish education catering to the needs of these young Jews; in summer 1917 the Zionist organization in Vienna recruited him to lead its education and youth work. From 1917 to 1921 Bernfeld was in charge of Zionistischer Zentralrat für West-Österreich (Zionist Central Council for Western-Austria), and in 1919 he headed a project called Kinderheim Baumgarten, which provided housing and education for 300 Jewish children from Poland, who were displaced during the war.

From 1922 until 1925 he practiced psychoanalysis in Vienna, where one of his analysands was the British scientist Lionel Penrose. From 1925 to 1932 he worked at the Berlin Psychoanalytic Institute. Subsequently he returned to Vienna and, with the threat of Nazism, went into exile in Menton on the French Riviera, where he stayed until 1936. Afterwards he emigrated to the United States, where he worked as an educator in San Francisco.

In a 1931 article published on the journal edited by Freud, Bernfeld defined psychoanalysis coining the German term Spurenwissenschaft ("science of traces"). He is also remembered for his research in providing a link between psychoanalysis and educational theory. He was interested in the role of education and how it related to issues such as social change and social inequality. He was an early proponent of Freudo-Marxism and developed theories regarding the correlation of psychoanalysis with socialism. He regarded educational reformer Gustav Wyneken (1875-1964) an early influence in his career, and he was a member of several liberal and "youth culture" organizations.

Among his written works was an influential book on infant psychology called Psychologie des Säuglings and a 1925 work on educational theory titled Sisyphos, which advocated a non-authoritarian educational system that stresses the importance of the instinctual life and the needs of the student. He also published an important work on psychoanalytic interpretation called Der Begriff der "Deutung" in der Psychoanalyse, in which he explains the correlation of psychoanalysis to scientific principles. Later in his career, he published several articles about the early scientific work of Sigmund Freud.
