= Ulrich Becher =

German author and playwright (1910–1990)

Ulrich Becher (2 January 1910 – 15 April 1990) was a German author and playwright.

== Overview ==
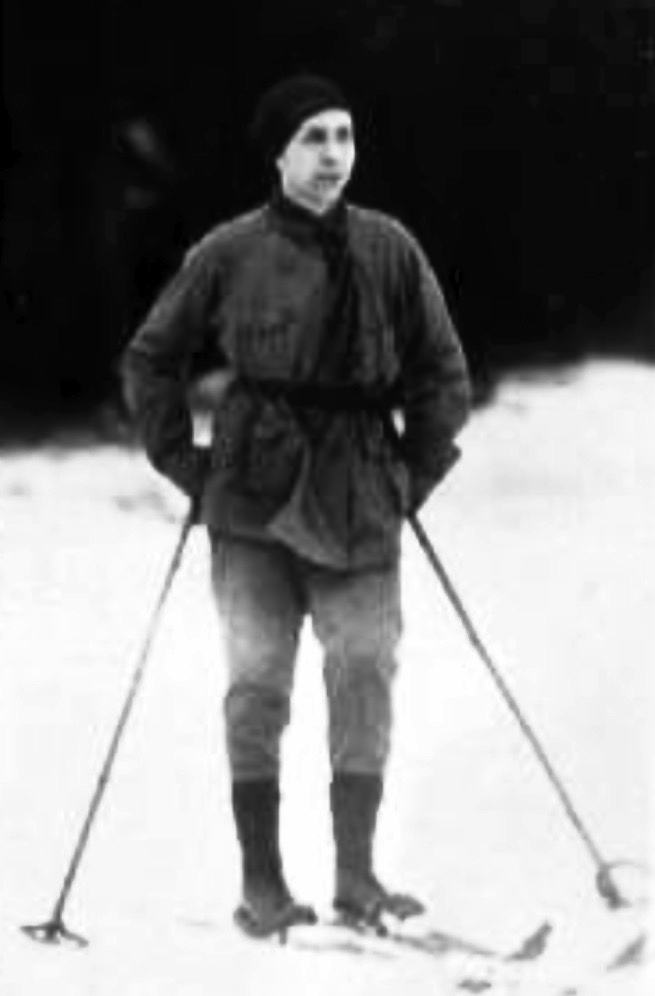
Becher ulrich 1924

Becher was born in Berlin, where, after attending the Wickersdorf Free School Community, he studied law. During his school years he had already made the acquaintance of George Grosz, who had taken on the talented youth as his only pupil.

In 1932, his novella series Männer machen Fehler ("Men Make Mistakes") was published by Rowohlt Verlag. In the same year Becher became a member of PEN. On the assumption of power by the Nazi Party in 1933, his work was condemned as "degenerate" literature, and he was the youngest writer to have his works thrown into a book-burning fire (see degenerate art for more information). On 11 November 1933, he married Dana, daughter of the Austrian author Alexander Roda Roda and consequently took Austrian citizenship. As the son of the Swiss pianist Elisabeth Ulrich, he hoped he would be able to live in Switzerland as an author, however in the eyes of the Swiss authorities his anti-fascist stance went against Switzerland's neutrality policy. He was consequently denied a work permit and was driven to emigrate. At the last minute, Becher and his wife succeeded in escaping to Brazil via Portugal in 1941. Efforts to obtain a visa to enter the United States were to last three years. At last, Becher was granted permission to enter the country and settled in New York City near his parents and parents-in-law.

In 1948, he returned to Europe with Der Bockerer ("Bockerer"), a completed theatre play that he had created with Peter Preses, which went on to have great success in Vienna (and which was turned into a film in 1981 by Franz Antel). In 1954 he settled in Basel, and in 1976 he won the Lifetime Achievement Award of the Swiss Schiller Foundation. He died in Basel, aged 80.

== Selected works ==
- Männer machen Fehler ("Men Make Mistakes"). Narratives, Berlin (Rowohlt), 1932.
- Niemand ("Nobody"). Modern mystery play, Ostrava (Kittl), 1934.
- Die Eroberer ("The Conquerors"). Stories from Europe, Zürich (Oprecht), 1936.
- Der Bockerer ("Bockerer"). Tragic farce, co-written with Peter Preses, Vienna (Sexl) 1946 (filmed by Franz Antel in 1981).
- Reise zum blauen Tag ("Journey to the Blue Day"). Verses, St. Gallen (Verlag der Volksstimme), 1946.
- Nachtigall will zum Vater fliegen ("A Nightingale Wants To Fly To His Father"). A cycle of New York novellas in four nights, Vienna (Sexl), 1950.
- Brasilianischer Romanzero ("Brazilian Romanzero"). Vienna (Frick); Zürich (Classen), 1950.
- Kurz nach 4 ("Shortly after 4"). Novel, Hamburg (Rowohlt), 1957.
- Spiele der Zeit ("Contemporary Games") - Samba; Feuerwasser ("Firewater"); Die Kleinen und die Großen ("The Great and the Small"). Hamburg (Rowohlt), 1957.
- Das Herz des Hais ("The Heart of the Shark"). Novel, Reinbek (Rowohlt), 1960.
- Spiele der Zeit, Bd. 2 ("Contemporary Games, Vol. 2") - Niemand (Nobody); Makumba; Mademoiselle Löwenzom. Berlin. 1968.
- Murmeljagd (The Woodchuck Hunt, 1977). Novel, Reinbek (Rowohlt), 1969.
- Das Profil ("The Profile"). Novel, Reinbek (Rowohlt), 1973.
- William's Ex-Casino. Novel, Zürich; Cologne (Benziger), 1973.
- SIFF. Selektive Identifizierung von Freund und Feind ("SIFF. Selective Identification of Friend and Foe"). Essays, Zürich; Köln (Benziger), 1978.
- Franz Patenkindt. Epic of François Villon's German Godson in Fifteen Bench-Songs, Berlin (Berliner Handpresse), 1979.
- Vom Unzulänglichen der Wirklichkeit ("On The Inadequacies of Reality"). 10 not so nice stories, Basel (Lenos), 1983.
- Abseits vom Rodeo ("Aside from the Rodeo"). Novella, Basel (Lenos), 1991.

Bibliography

- Giorgia Sogos, Deutschland gestern und heute. Die Darstellung der Fremde in der Exil- und Migrationsliteratur im deutschsprachigen Kontext. Eine vergleichende Analyse, Free Pen Verlag, Bonn 2020, ISBN 978-3-945177-74-7.
