= Gustav Wyneken =

German pedagogue (1875–1964)

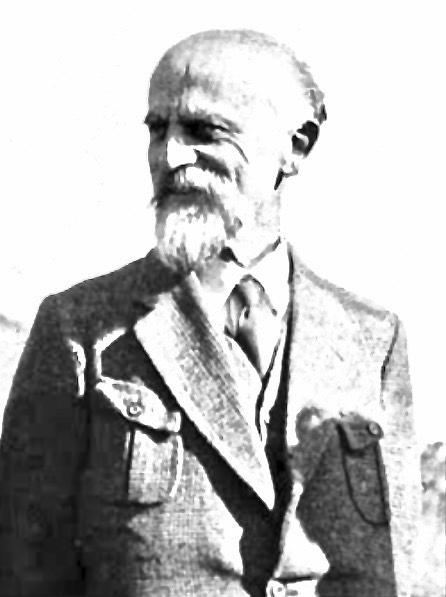
- Born: April 19, 1875; Stade, German Empire
- Died: December 8, 1964 (aged 89); Göttingen, West Germany
- Occupations: Educator, writer
- Known for: Wickersdorf Free School Community

Gustav Wyneken (April 19, 1875 – December 8, 1964) was a German pedagogue and founder of the Wickersdorf Free School Community. He was also a leader in the German Youth Movement and briefly contributed to school policy during the German revolutionary period after World War I. He failed to regain support for his school reform ideas after his conviction as a pederast.

== Life and career ==
Gustav Wyneken was born April 19, 1875, in Stade, northern Germany. After passing his teachers' exam, he became a teacher at Hermann Lietz's progressive school in rural Ilsenburg, central Germany. Wyneken became its director in 1901 and eventually left due to differences with Lietz.

In 1906, Wyneken founded the Wickersdorf Free School Community in Thuringia with Odenwaldschule founder Paul Geheeb and others.

The Ministry of Saxe-Meiningen dismissed Wyneken from his teaching post following infighting at the school. Wyneken joined the Youth Movement and lectured for the Association for Free School Communities.

Wyneken became a personal advisor to Konrad Haenisch, a German social democratic politician with the Prussian Ministry of Education, during Germany's post-World War I revolutionary period. Wyneken also advised Johannes Hoffmann, the Bavarian social democratic Minister of Education in the Eisner government. Wyneken was involved in two decrees, on school community (Schulgemeinde) and religious education, that were assailed for their democratizing and secularizing effects and quickly repealed.

In 1919, Haenisch helped restore Wyneken to lead the Wickersdorf school, but he was ousted the next year upon a guilty conviction for homosexual contact with students. Wyneken responded by publishing Eros (1921), which advocated for pederastic relations between teachers and boys said to exist in ancient Greece in defense of his actions and philosophy. Wyneken continued to live nearby and influence Wickersdorf in person and in writing.

He continued to work as a freelance writer and unsuccessfully attempted to re-enter West Germany's school and youth policy debate. Wyneken died in Göttingen on December 8, 1964.

== Thought ==
In his 1913 book, Schule und Jugendkultur (School and Youth Culture), Wyneken defined the Wickersdorf school as cultivating individual consciousnesses as a refraction of the world's unified, metaphysical spirit, each consciousness bringing the world to greater consciousness of itself. The purpose of life and the goal of education is to serve the world's one, objective spirit.

Wyneken's ideal school life drew from the progressive rural school model and development of a school community that included deliberation by a democratic general assembly of both teachers and students. Emphasizing art's role in expressing the spirit, Wyneken also supported musical education and community theater.

In its time, the Wickersdorf school was seen as progressive during a period of experimental cultural policy for its opposition to existing schooling models.

== Legacy ==
Wyneken's ideas influenced the Zionist return to Palestine and the Zionist youth movement Hashomer Hatzair. Siegfried Bernfeld was a proponent of Wyneken's ideas.

== Selected works ==
- Schule und Jugendkultur (1913)
- Der Kampf für die Jugend: Gesammelte Aufsätze (1919)
- Eros (1921)
- Wickersdorf (1922)
- Musikalische Weltanschauung: Eine Vorlesung (1948)
- Die Freie Schulgemeinde (edited 1910–1920), periodical of the Bundes für Freie Schulgemeinden

== Bibliography ==
- Neupert, Jutta (1988). "Wyneken, Gustav, Pädagoge". In Benz, Wolfgang; Graml, Hermann (eds.). Biographisches Lexikon zur Weimarer Republik (in German). Munich: C. H. Beck. pp. 374–375. ISBN 978-3-406-32988-3.
