= Paul Geheeb =

German pedagogue (1870–1961)

- Geheeb in 1909
- Born: October 10, 1870; Geisa, Germany
- Died: May 1, 1961 (aged 90); Hasliberg, Switzerland
- Occupation: Pedagogue
- Known for: Wickersdorf Free School Community, Odenwaldschule, Ecole d'Humanité

Paul Geheeb (1870–1961) was a German pedagogue in the German rural boarding school movement known for co-founding the boarding schools Wickersdorf Free School Community, Odenwaldschule, and Ecole d'Humanité.
