= German rural boarding school movement =

19th-century German educational movement

The German rural boarding school movement (German: Landerziehungsheimbewegung) is a model of rural boarding school education designed to function more like a live-in community than traditional schooling models. The German pedagogue Hermann Lietz provided the philosophical underpinnings for the movement to create these schools in the early 20th century.

== Background ==
The pedagogue Hermann Lietz was raised in a rural setting, which he came to believe were the best environments for youth development.

== Lietz schools ==
Lietz opened his first rural boarding school in the mountainous Ilsenburg in 1898.

He opened additional schools in Haubinda (Thuringia) in 1901; Bieberstein Palace, Hesse, in 1904; and an orphanage (Landweisenheim) in Veckenstedt in 1914. Lietz's followers would open additional schools beyond his four.

Lietz created a plan in 1911 to have his schools governed by a trust, but died in 1911 before the plan could be executed. His followers completed the Stiftung Deutsche Landerziehungsheime trust in 1920, which continues to exist to the present day in supporting the Hermann-Lietz-Schulen.

== Influence ==
Lietz's method influenced Kurt Hahn in the creation of the Schule Schloss Salem and his Outward Bound experiential learning program. The Germany rural boarding school movement also influenced the United World Colleges and similar schools internationally. Japanese education reformer Kuniyoshi Obara said he wanted "to be Lietz in Japan" and his Tamagawa Gakuen school took influence from the Lietz's model.

== Bibliography ==
- Koerrenz, Ralf; Blichmann, Annika; Engelmann, Sebastian (2018). "Hermann Leitz and the German Country Boarding Schools". Alternative Schooling and New Education: European Concepts and Theories. Palgrave Studies in Alternative Education. Palgrave Macmillan. ISBN 978-3-319-67863-4.
