= Hermann Lietz =

German educationist (1868–1919)

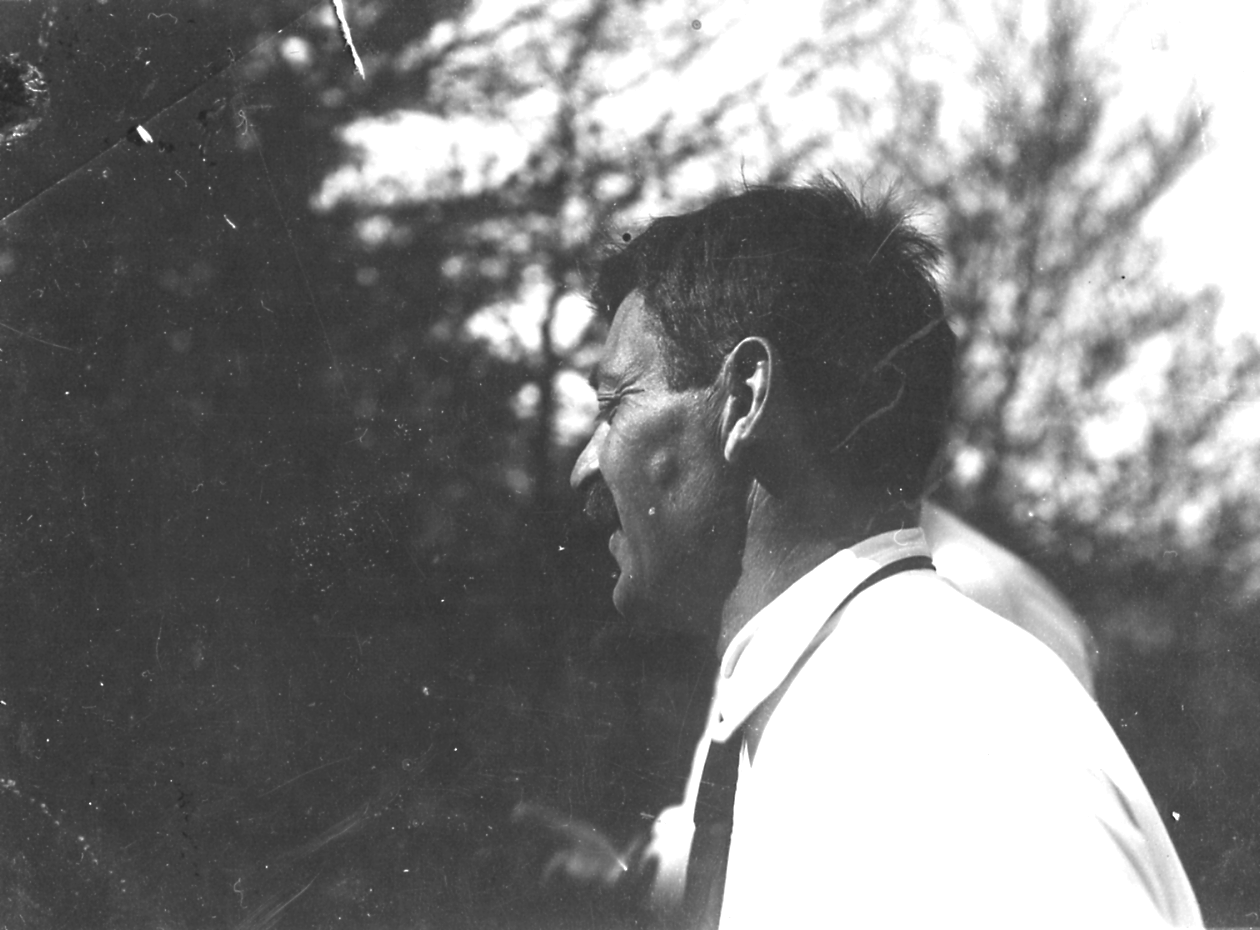
Hermann Lietz around 1910

Hermann Lietz (28 April 1868, in Dumgenevitz on Rügen – 12 June 1919, in Haubinda) was a German educational progressive and theologian who founded the German Landerziehungsheime für Jungen (country boarding schools).

In 1898 he taught at the progressive Abbotsholme School for boys, founded in Derbyshire, England, in 1889 by Cecil Reddie. Lietz was impressed by the Abbotsholme system of education, which combined comprehensive individual instruction with physical exercise and recreation. By 1904 he had founded three Landerziehungsheime, based on Reddie's model, for boys of different ages, in Ilsenburg, Haubinda, and Bieberstein. Lietz eventually succeeded in establishing five more Landerziehungsheime.

Like the Abbotsholme model, Lietz emphasized sports, crafts, modern languages and science, while de-emphasizing rote learning and classical languages. He was a student of Wilhelm Rein, and was himself an influence on Gustav Wyneken, Elisabeth Rotten, and Kurt Hahn. His school was also attended by Elisabeth von Thadden. Lietz's liberalism extended to education and criticism of class privilege only. He was otherwise politically right wing and distrusted socialism, parliamentary politics, and the influence of urban life.
