= China in Ten Words =

2010 book by Yu Hua

- First edition (French)
- Author: Yu Hua
- Original title: 十个词汇里的中国/十個詞彙裡的中國 – shí gè cíhuì lǐ de zhōngguó
- Translator: Allan Hepburn Barr
- Language: Chinese
- Genre: Essay
- Publisher: Random House
- Publication date: 2010
- Publication place: China
- English publication date: 2011
- Media type: Print (hardback & paperback)
- Pages: 240
- ISBN: 978-0307739797

China in Ten Words (simplified Chinese: 十个词汇里的中国; traditional Chinese: 十個詞彙裡的中國; pinyin: shí gè cíhuì lǐ de zhōngguó) is an essay collection by the contemporary Chinese author Yu Hua, who is known for his novels To Live, Chronicle of a Blood Merchant, and Brothers. China in Ten Words was first published in French, titled La Chine en dix mots, by the publishing house Actes Sud in 2010 and the Chinese version was later published in Taiwan in 2011; an English translation by Allan H. Barr appeared the same year. The book is banned in China, but Yu Hua reworked some of his essays for publication in the mainland China market in the 2015 essay collection We Live Amidst Vast Disparities (simplified Chinese: 我们生活在巨大的差距里; traditional Chinese: 我們生活在巨大的差距裡; pinyin: wǒmen shēnghuó zài jùdà de chājù lǐ).

Structured around the ten two-character words, Yu Hua's essay collection narrates a personal account on momentous events, such as the Great Leap Forward, Cultural Revolution and the 1989 Tiananmen Square protests and massacre, while accentuating the proliferation of graduate unemployment, social inequality and political corruption in accompaniment with China's rapid change into a modernized nation. Following Yu Hua's journey through his childhood days, during the Mao Era, to contemporary China, he also unveils the beginning and escalation of China's "copycat" and "bamboozle" culture, terms that one may associate with counterfeiting, infringement, imitation, dishonesty and fraud.

The ten words are: people (人民), leader (领袖), reading (阅读), writing (写作), Lu Xun (鲁迅), revolution (革命), disparity (差距), grassroots (草根), copycat (山寨), and bamboozle (忽悠).

== Words ==
People (人民): The populace of People's Republic of China (中华人民共和国).

Leader (领袖): The one who commands and guides a group, institution or nation.

Reading (阅读): The act of decoding written language.

Writing (写作): The act of encoding language.

Lu Xun (鲁迅): An influential writer and essayist of Chinese literature during the first three decades of the twentieth century.

Revolution (革命): The Cultural Revolution is marked as China's most momentous movement towards modernization.

Disparity (差距): The gap in infrastructural development between cities and villages, income level between the rich and the poor and other aspects of the Chinese society.

Grassroots (草根): Those belonging in the lower rungs of social hierarchy, especially economically disadvantaged people.

Copycat (山寨): The imitation of well-known and trademarked commodities with inferior quality.

Bamboozle (忽悠): A word encompassing various connotations, such as enticement, entrapment, deceit, dishonesty, misrepresentation and fraud (p. 137).

== Reception ==
China in Ten Words has been reviewed extensively, and mostly positively in the English-language press, including by prominent China experts such as Perry Link and Jeffrey Wasserstrom, and in outlets such as The New York Times and The Wall Street Journal.

James Fallows, writing in The Atlantic, characterised the collection as "an outstanding set of essays on the general topic of why modern China is the way it is, each essay centered on a Chinese word or phrase.... Very much worth reading." Laura Miller wrote in Salon that "Yu Hua has a fiction writer's nose for the perfect detail, the everyday stuff that conveys more understanding than a thousand Op-Eds.... Perhaps the most bewitching aspect of this book is how funny it is.... He comes across as an Asian fusion of David Sedaris and Charles Kuralt." Lagaya Misha assessed it in the New York Times as "an uneven mixture of memoir and polemic, farce and fury, short on statistics but long on passion. China in Ten Words...is a cautionary tale about the risks of subterfuge, of trying to sneak something past one's father — or, perhaps, one's ever vigilant government."

Scholars from across the literary, cultural and linguistic fields have also expressed profound interest in Yu Hua's essay collection and established their individual interpretations of China in Ten Words' cultural, political and social narratives. One such scholar proposes that China in Ten Words is not intended for the mainland Chinese audience with its blatant intent to criticize Communist China. She also states that "bamboozled" (忽悠), used in the contemporary setting, is intended to illustrate China's market capitalism despite its socialist orthodoxy. Another scholar propounds that Yu Hua's decision to publish China in Ten Words' Chinese version in Taiwan accentuates the political repressiveness of the PRC in comparison to the ROC. She asserts, "Yu [Hua] appears to place more trust in Taiwan's government than in China's to protect his freedom and rights." Attention is also drawn to the social endemics of contemporary China arising as a result of the growing disparity (差距) between the wealthy and the impoverished.

== Character/event parallels ==
A list of the several real-life incidents and people Yu Hua mentions in China in Ten Words that is referenced in his other works, such as Brothers, The Seventh Day, Chronicle of a Blood Merchant, and To Live.

Leader (领袖):

1990s Beauty Contests: "Silver-haired Beauty Contest", "Tipsy Beauty Contest" and "Artificial Beauty Contest" (p. 13) and Baldy Li's “National Hymen Olympic Games" in Brothers (p. 475).

Around 2010-2012: Mass protests and demonstrations against "environmental degradation, moral collapse, the polarization of rich and poor and pervasive corruption," (p. 17) reflected in Television report in The Seventh Day (p. 23).

Reading (阅读):

Savage house lootings during the Cultural Revolution (p. 25): The Red Guards ransacked and raided Song Fanping's house in Brothers (p. 77).

Great Famine(1959–62): Starved students have resorted to eating leaves off trees (p. 26). In To Live, villagers ate pumpkin leaves and tree bark (p. 137), while city-folks in Chronicle of a Blood Merchant lived on wild vegetables (p. 117).

Writing (写作):

Yu Hua's father labeled "landlord's brat" and "runaway landlord" because of his father's landowner status prior to 1949 (p. 44). Song Fanping, in Brothers, is implicated during land reform because he was born into the landowning class (p. 77).

Huang Shuai and Yu Hua's manuscript exchange and shenanigans (p.52) mirrors Writer Liu and Song Gang's situation in the metal factory in Brothers (p.224).

Revolution (革命):

China's frenzied steel production during the Great Leap Forward removed peasants from tilling farms to melting steel (p.78). All pots and pans were shattered and used to make steel in To Live (p.101).

Forcible evictions and building destruction in 2011, while some were trapped and killed during the process (p.88). In The Seventh Day, Zheng Xiaomin's parents were buried alive during government demolitions (p.22).

Yu Hua's classmate is sent to the mountains and villages, along with other high school graduates, for further education, and dies from hepatitis (p.92). In Chronicle of a Blood Merchant, Yile also contracts a form of hepatitis after he is sent to the countryside (p.206).

Grassroots (草根):

Chronicle of a Blood Merchant's Blood Chief Li inspired by the Blood Chief Yu Hua met in his childhood (p.117).

"Garbage King" who went from rags-to-riches from collecting and buying cheap trash and reselling them at a higher price after sorting them (p. 112). In Brothers, Baldy Li's success story also begins with his scrap business in front of the government building (p. 377).

Copycat (山寨):

Gaffer Shen, Yu Hua's dentist mentor, worked with Yu Hua on the streets under an oilskin umbrella with forceps, mallets and other tools spread on a table (p.133). Brothers' Yanker Yu is also a "copycat dentist" who works in a small town (p. 60).

== Publication ==
| Country/region | Publication year | Publisher | Book name |
|---|---|---|---|
| France | 2010 | Actes Sud | La Chine en dix mots |
| Taiwan | 2011 | 麥田出版股份有限公司 | 十個詞彙裡的中國 |
| America Translated by Allan Hepburn Barr. | 2011 | Pantheon Books | China in Ten Words |
| Canada Translated by Allan Hepburn Barr. | 2012 | Anchor | China in Ten Words |
| Australia Translated by Allan Hepburn Barr. | 2012 | Knopf Doubleday Publishing Group | China in Ten Words |
| South Korea Translated by Tae-Seong Kim | 2012 | 문학동네 | 사람의 목소리는 빛보다 멀리 간다 -위화, 열 개의 단어로 중국을 말하다- |
| China Reworked as We Live Amidst Vast Disparities | 2015 | 北京十月文艺出版社 | 我们生活在巨大的差距里 |
| Poland Translated by Katarzyna Sarek | 2018 | Wydawnictwo Akademickie Dialog | Chiny w dziesięciu słowach |
| Hungary Translated by Klára Zombory | 2018 | Magvető | Kína tíz szóban |
| Bulgaria Translated by Stefan Rusinov | 2024 | Жанет 45 | Китай в десет думи |
