= Harvest (Chinese magazine) =

Chinese bi-monthly literary magazine

- Frequency: Bimonthly
- First issue: July 1957
- Country: China
- Based in: Shanghai
- Language: Chinese
- Website: www.shouhuo-harvest.com
- ISSN: 0583-1288

Harvest (simplified Chinese: 收获; traditional Chinese: 收穫; pinyin: Shōuhuò) is a Chinese bimonthly literary magazine founded by Ba Jin and Jin Yi in July 1957. The circulation of the magazine in 2007 was 123,000 copies. Harvest also publishes two novel supplements each year, each issue with four novels and a circulation of around 70,000 to 80,000 copies. Quite a number of Harvest writers have become social celebrities, including 2 Novel Prize winners.

== History ==
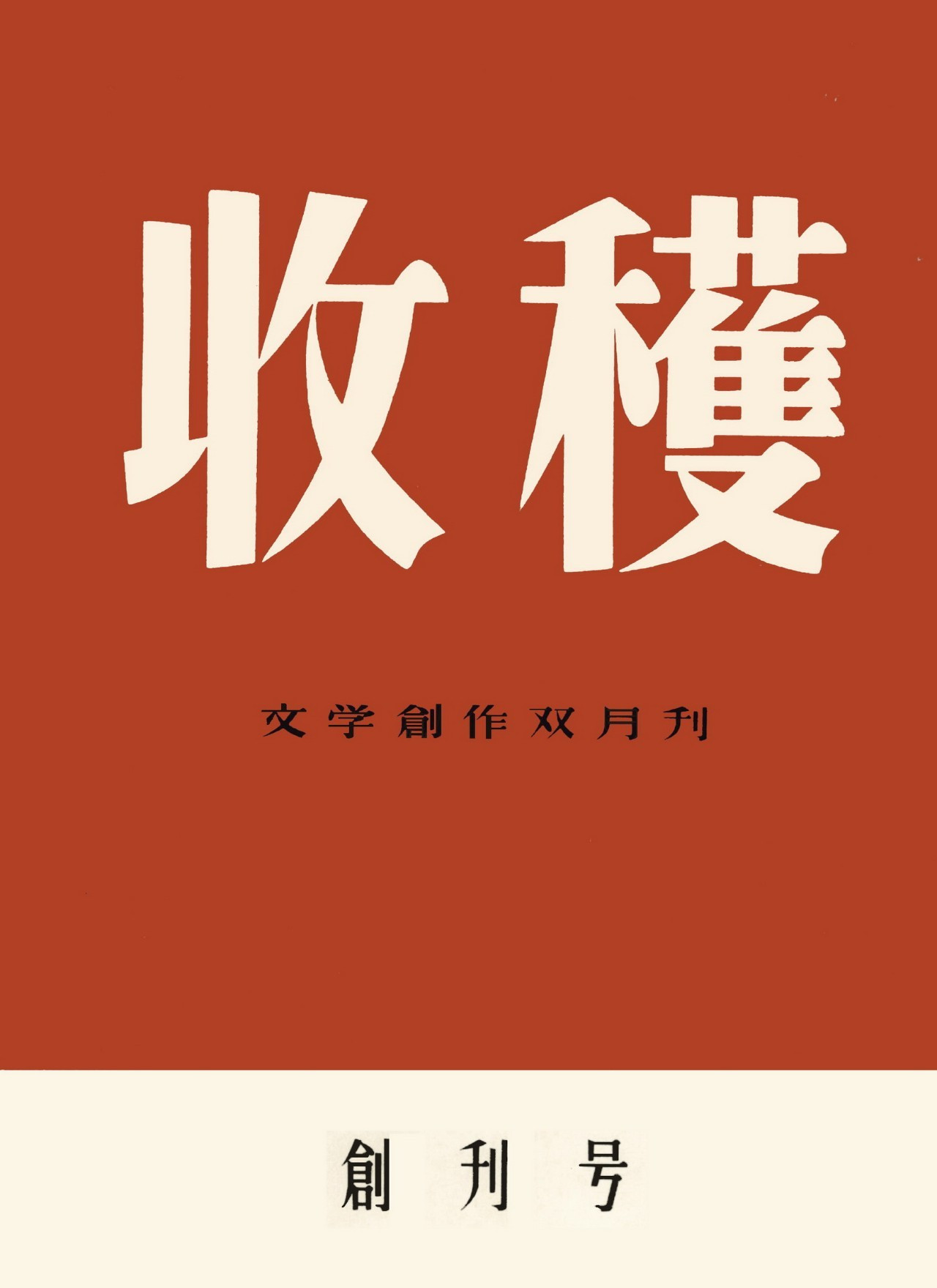
Cover of the first issue of Harvest

On July 24, 1957, Harvest was founded as a bimonthly magazine, edited by Ba Jin and Jin Yi. It was under the supervision of the China Writers Association, with its editorial office in Shanghai and printing and publishing in Beijing. The first issue published Lu Xun’s article “The Historical Changes of Chinese Fiction” and Lao She’s play “Teahouse”.

In May 1960, due to the Three-year Great Famine, Harvest ceased publication after publishing three issues for that year, with a total of 18 issues. The editor-in-chief, Mr. Jin Yi, died of illness in November 1959.

In 1964, Harvest was resumed and supervised by the Shanghai Writers Association. It was still a bimonthly magazine, with Ba Jin as the editor-in-chief.

In May 1966, Harvest was forced to cease publication again due to the Cultural Revolution. During this period, Harvest published a total of 14 issues.

In January 1979, the Cultural Revolution ended and Harvest was published again. At that time, many ideological constraints were first broken through literary works.

In 1986, Harvest began to be self-sufficient.

In 1999, Harvest won the National Periodical Award, the highest honor for national periodicals.

In 2004, "Harvest" was awarded the title of "Shanghai Famous Trademark", and for the second time in 2007.

In 2005, Ba Jin died. Starting from the first issue of 2006, the editor-in-chief has been signed by Ba Jin's daughter, Li Xiaolin, the former deputy editor-in-chief of Harvest.

In 2007, Harvest launched a special issue commemorating its 50th anniversary.

In March 2018, it was awarded the honor of “Top 100 Social Science Journals of 2017”.

In 2021, the Harvest APP was launched.

In 2022, Harvest launched the "Boundless Literature Award", including three awards - the Interpretation Novel Award, the Illustrated Prose Award and the Singing Poetry Award to discover and cultivate cross-border talents.

== Film and television dramas ==
In 1957, Harvest published Lao She's Teahouse and Ke Ling's The City That Never Sleeps in its inaugural issue., both of which were later made into movies. Other examples include:

- Su Tong's "Wives and Concubines" (Movie "Raise the Red Lantern")
- Yu Hua's "To Live (novel)" (movie "To Live")
- Lu Yao's "Life" (movie "Life")
- Wang Shuo's "You Are Not an Ordinary Person" (movie "The Dream Factory (film)")
- Wang Shuo's "Animal Fierceness" (movie "In the Heat of the Sun")
- Mo Yan's "The Master Is Getting More and More Humorous" (Happy Times (2000 film))
- Guo Jingming's "Jade Dynasty" (Movie "L.O.R.D: Legend of Ravaging Dynasties")

== Celebrities and Harvest ==
- Bing Xin called Harvest "the red rose in my heart". She said: "I am the most loyal reader of Harvest. When it arrives, I will read it carefully from the beginning. I often pile it up on my desk. At the end of the year, I will bundle it up and put it in the closet."
- Feng Jicai said that his "literary journey started with Harvest."
- Jia Pingwa's major novels, including "Fuzo", "Gao Laozhuang", "Missing the Wolf" and "Qin Opera", were all published in Harvest. He himself said: "This is my luck and my pride."
- Wang Anyi said that Harvest "has a curious and innocent character, and is ready to explore all new things, which makes it always appears young."
- Zhang Xinxin said that the relationship between a person and a magazine is “so hidden, so important, and so personal.”
- Mo Yan (Nobel Prize winner) said, “Not submitting manuscripts that I am not satisfied with to Harvest is the greatest respect I can give to Harvest.”
- Yu Qiuyu: "I have read Harvest clearly for decades. Entering it, I can at least feel a sense of security, reality and freshness."
- Nearly three quarters of Yu Hua's works were published in Harvest, including his most famous works such as Shout and Drizzle, To Live, and Xu Sanguan Selling Blood. “Later, I realized that this was a tradition that began when Ba Jin and Jin Yi founded Harvest. Regardless of the fame of the author, they would all receive the same respect in Harvest.”
- Gao Xingjian (Nobel Prize winner)'s novella "There is a Pigeon Called Red Lips" was first published in the third issue of Harvest in 1981.

== Lawsuit ==
Zhu Jianguo sued Harvest magazine for false advertising and deceiving consumers, but ultimately lost the case.

== See also ==
- People's Literature
- Shiyue (magazine)
- Chinese Literature Today
- Gushi Hui
- Harvest (magazine)
