= Lu Xun Literary Institute =

National academy of China

Coordinates: 39.921389°N 116.500995°E

The Lu Xun Literary Institute (鲁迅文学院), located in Beijing, is China's only national academy in literature education. Established in 1950 as the Central Literary Research Institute (中央文学研究所), it was closed in 1957 due to the Anti-Rightist Movement and not reopened until 1980. The current name, after the prominent literary figure Lu Xun, was adopted in 1984. Ding Ling was the institute's first director.

Yu Hua, a notable author who published (among others) To Live and Chronicle of a Blood Merchant, is an alumnus of the institute.

== Book ==
- Leung Laifong (2005). "Lu Xun Literary Institute". In Davis, Edward L. (ed.). Encyclopedia of Contemporary Chinese Culture. Routledge. p. 503. ISBN 0-415-24129-4.
