= To Live =

To Live may refer to the following works;

- To Liv(e), 1992 Hong Kong film by Evans Chan
- To Live (novel), written by Yu Hua
  - To Live (1994 film), based on the novel and directed by Zhang Yimou
- To Live (1937 film), an Italian film, directed by Guido Brignone
- To Live (2010 film), a Russian film directed by Yuri Bykov
- Ikiru, a Japanese film directed by Akira Kurosawa whose title translates to To Live
