= Brothers (Yu novel) =

2005 novel by Yu Hua

- Volume 1, First Chinese edition
- Author: Yu Hua
- Original title: 兄弟 (Xiong Di)
- Translator: Eileen Cheng-yin Chow and Carlos Rojas
- Language: Chinese
- Publisher: Pantheon Books (English); Shanghai Literature (Chinese)
- Publication date: 2005 (Part 1); 2006 (Part 2)
- Publication place: China
- English publication date: 2009
- Pages: 656
- ISBN: 978-0-375-42499-1

Brothers (Chinese: 兄弟; pinyin: Xiōngdì) is the longest novel written by the Chinese novelist Yu Hua, in total of 76 chapters, separately published in 2005 for the part 1 (of the first 26 chapters) and in 2006 for part 2 (of the rest 50 chapters) by Shanghai Literature and Art Publishing House. This was Yu Hua's first novel after a decade of dormancy from writing and publishing works. It has over 180 thousand characters in Chinese, more than the 100 thousand characters that were originally planned for the book. It intertwines tragedy and comedy, and Yu Hua himself admits that the novel is personally his favorite literary work. Brothers was a new realm of literature for Yu Hua, with the novel often being described as extremely crude and expletive. Brothers has experienced great success with nearly 1 million copies sold in China. By 2019, Yu Hua's works had been published in 38 countries and translated into 35 different languages. This success may be contributed to his success publicity tour to gain attraction towards the novel after his hiatus from writing. While reception among Chinese critics was generally negative, the novel was shortlisted for the Man Asian Literary Prize and awarded France's Prix Courrier International in 2008. It was translated into English by Eileen Cheng-yin Chow and Carlos Rojas in 2009, a couple from the Middle Eastern department at Duke University.

The story of the novel revolves around the step-brotherhood between protagonists Baldy Li and Song Gang. Their life, both absurd and tragic, throughout China's history from the 1960s to the early period of the reform and opening up serves as the main plot. The division of the novel into two parts is contextually on the basis of the death of Li Lan, the biological mother of Baldy Li and the step-mother of Song Gang. The first part primarily focuses on their childhood, especially during the Cultural Revolution with the collapse of their reorganized family and the tragedy of Song Fanping, the biological father of Song Gang and the step-father of Baldy Li. The second part focuses on their adulthood with different life trajectories, especially during the early period of the reform and opening up that formulates the mixture of absurdity and tragedy.

== Background ==
As shown in the translator's preface, even though Brothers was published in 2005 and 2006, Yu Hua "originally conceived of the idea for the novel as early as 1995". The process of his writing was not well-off at the beginning. However, during his seven-month trip to the United States and France in 2003, he was "inspired" to go back to the project while China was stuck in the "beauty-pageant fever". The "Miss World competition", "Tourism Queen International pageant", "National Contest of the Beauty of the Gray-headed for contestants over fifty-five", and "Miss Artificial Beauty pageant for plastic surgery recipients" are representative of the trend of absurdity in China that encouraged Yu Hua for the continuation of the novel that is of the reality of absurdity. Turns out, the reality of absurdity is demonstrated in the novel, especially in Part 2 with a fictional event called "National Virgin Beauty Competition".

Yu Hua had expressed in an interview with Zhang Qinghua that he wanted to express some level of chaos in Brothers, which had characterized his writing throughout the 1980s to the present. The Cultural Revolution plays a major role in the novel, particularly in Part 1. The brothers have to navigate their way through the chaotic times of the political movement that happened in this time period. Yu Hua himself came of age during the Cultural Revolution. He said in the interview, "The Cultural Revolution was my formative experience, from the age of seven to seventeen, which of course would leave a significant impact". His view of violence also heavily influenced the writing of the book. He mentioned that the scene where Song Fanping - one of the main characters in the novel - was being beaten to death, was influenced by his own witness of an individual being beaten to death by the head of the revolutionary committee. The background of the author and of the Cultural Revolution with violence is significant because much of what happens in the book reflects the chaos that accompanied it.

== Plot summary ==
Brothers describes the step-brotherhood between Baldy Li and Song Gang. Their life of childhood and adolescence accompanied by their parents, Li Lan and Song Fanping, as a reorganized family amidst the rising and falling during the Culture Revolution period is depicted in Part 1. Their life of adulthood with different living trajectories and destines during the early period of China's Opening-up is depicted in Part 2.

=== Part 1 ===
Before the birth of Baldy Li, his biological father falls into the cesspool and drowns himself while peeping at women's butts in a public latrine. When Baldy Li becomes a teenager, he is caught and marched by Poet Zhao and Writer Liu as punishment for peeking at five women's butts in a latrine. The mother of Baldy Li, Li Lan, is ashamed, resulting in her bitter muttering about her son – "A chip off the old block". Even though Baldy Li's good name is ruined, he begins to sell his glimpse of the naked bottom of Lin Hong, who is the most beautiful woman in Liu Town, in exchange of house-special noodles.

Li Lan was extremely distressed and afraid of losing face due to the shameful death of her husband, resulting in the long-term migraines after giving birth to Baldy Li. She shuts the door to the public and becomes isolated while raising Baldy Li. Song Fanping – the man who is always nice to Li Lan and brings the shit-covered dead body of the father of Baldy Li back to her – is an exception. When Song Fanping's wife dies and Baldy Li is about seven, Li Lan and Song Fanping get married. Song Fanping, Li Lan, Baldy Li, and Song Gang – the son of Song Fanping become a new blended family.

One year after their marriage, Li Lan's migraines get worse. Song Fanping asks Li Lan to go to Shanghai for better medical treatment. Song Fanping takes care of Baldy Li and Song Gang himself. With the arrival of the Cultural Revolution, Song Fanping is overthrown because he is born into the landowning class. Song Fanping begins sweeping the school with red plaques around his neck, Baldy Li translates these plaques according to Song Fanping's lessons about landlord being similar to Chairman Mao. Song Fanping is tortured and locked up in a warehouse. The kids have to take care of themselves while being bullied by their peers.

Song Fanping escapes from the warehouse and tries to pick Li Lai up in Shanghai as he promised, but he is beaten and tortured to death by the Red Guards at the bus depot of Liu Town. "How can people be this vicious?", says Mama Su, who witnesses Song Fanping's death.

No one dares touch Song Fanping's body for Baldy Li and Song Gang, except a man named Tao Qing who helps the kids bring Song Fanping's dead body to their home. When Li Lan comes back from Shanghai and notices the death of her husband, she remains strong and handles his death. Li Lan purchases a coffin and brings his body to his birth town where Song Gang is picked up by his grandfather to live in the countryside.

Li Lan remains loyal and steadfast for seven years after the death of Song Fanping by refusing to wash her hair. By the time Baldy Li is caught because of peeking five women's butts in a latrine like his father, Li Lan worries about Baldy Li's future and realizes that she is dying. She then takes care of Baldy Li's orphan aid with Tao Qing and prepares her death affairs and visits Song Fanping's grave for the Qingming holiday. She is accompanied by both Baldy Li and Song Gang at the very last moment of her life. She requests Song Gang to take care of Baldy Li by entrusting the boys to remain brothers and to always be fair by splitting. Song Gang makes his promise.

=== Part 2 ===
Soon after Li Lan's death, Song Gang's grandfather dies as well. Song Gang then moves back to Liu Town and lives with Baldy Li. Baldy Li works at the Good Works Factory, and Song Gang works at the metal factory.

When Baldy Li is appointed factory director, he decides to woo Lin Hong with Song Gang's assistance. Lin Hong is sick of Baldy Li's notorious reputation but interested in Song Gang's grace and elegance. Song Gang reciprocates these feelings for Lin Hong. Eventually, Song Gang and Lin Hong get married. The following day of their marriage, Baldy Li goes to the hospital for a vasoligation with the goal of demonstrating his loyalty and steadfastness to Lin Hong.

Baldy Li gets heart-broken but produces a profit miracle one after another at the Good Works Factory made up of disabled men. He then resigns and decides to run his own processing business. After he collects money for capital accumulation from several people in Liu Town and requires them for business preparation, he goes to Shanghai to seek business opportunities. However, he fails. When he comes back to Liu Town, he cannot make a living but asks Song Gang for relief. Lin Hong is unhappy about the reunion of Song Gang and Baldy Li, thus Song Gang severs his connection with Baldy Li once more.

Baldy Li wants to go back to working at the Good Works Factory, but his request is rejected due to his unauthorized resignation that brought shame to Tao Qing. He thus protests in front of the county government building a scrap accumulation by sorting the junk. By accident, he begins to make money via selling the accumulated scraps and gets rich. He begins to return the debt to the town people he accumulated capital from with interests, he asks if they would like to join his newest business venture and heads to Japan for "junk suits" and speak with other businesses to become richer.

In the following five years, Baldy Li becomes a real man of wealth by running a real estate business in Liu Town. Nonetheless, Song Gang becomes unemployed. Even though he tries hard to make a living to support his family, he is seriously sick as his lungs are ruined. While Song Gang struggles with money-making, Baldy Li engages in a lawsuit with women who slept with Baldy Li and claim that he is the biological father of their kids. The farce at court ends up with the demonstration of Baldy Li's vasoligation that helps him win the lawsuit. After the farce, Writer Liu publishes a report to praise Baldy Li, resulting in making Baldy Li as a successful entrepreneur nation-widely. Liu Town is, therefore, known as Baldy Li's Town.

Song Gang compromises with Lin Hong to ask Baldy Li for employment. Baldy Li offers a management position to Song Gang, but he declines as he feels ill-prepared. In response, Baldy Li secretly gives money to Lin Hong and requests her to send Song Gang for medical treatment.

Baldy Li gets less and less famous from his nationwide image of a successful entrepreneur. He decides to hold an Inaugural National Virgin Beauty Competition to make his reputation great again. The so-called hymen economy springs up along with the competition. The Liu Town, which is also known as the Baldy Li's Town, is now named as Virgin Beauty Town. Thousands of virgins journey to Liu Town in hopes to win and possibly become Baldy Li's wife. Wandering Zhou, a charlatan, begins to make a profit during the competition by selling fake hymens international and domestic to the virgins.

Song Gang leaves Liu Town with Wandering Zhou and they head to Shanghai, then travel to southern China. To make money, they try to sell different products, and Song Gang even has a breast implantation surgery to better sell the Boobs bust-enhancing cream. Their cooperative charlatan journey ends up with Wandering Zhou dropping out to take care of his new-born daughter with Missy Su in Liu Town, preemptively becoming Wanderless Zhou.

While Song Gang is still on his journey, Baldy Li pays a Russian painter for a giant portrait and asks Lin Hong to unveil the portrait. Eventually, they begin an affair while Song Gang is away.

Song Gang comes back to Liu Town and hears about the affair between Baldy Li and Lin Hong. After consideration over a few days, Song Gang realizes and believes that Lin Hong should have been with Baldy Li since the beginning. He writes two letters – one for Lin Hong and another for Baldy Li – and then kills himself on the railway.

Baldy Li and Lin Hong hear of the death of Song Gang when they are sleeping together after Lin Hong's hymen reconstruction surgery. They are too late to regret it. On the next day, they receive Song Gang's letters. The letter to Lin Hong demonstrates Song Gang's love to her, and the letter to Baldy Li can be concluded by the last line: "even if heaven and earth were to be turned upside down, we would still be brothers...even if we are separated by life and death, we will still be brothers."

Three years after Song Gang's death, people change in Liu Town. Lin Hong becomes a pimp and runs her prostitution business. Baldy Li decides he wants to go to outer space with the goal of placing Song Gang's ashes in orbit to allow him traveling between the Moon and stars and gives the company to Writer Liu, now CEO Liu.

== Themes ==
Violence

Yu Hua revisits themes of death, violence, and family that he has touched on in his earlier works. There are several other themes that are apparent throughout Brothers, a prominent theme would be suffering, which is prevalent in Baldy Li's early life, especially with all of his misfortunes that both of his parents and his stepfather died when he was very young. This also demonstrates how it is a novel of survival, as Baldy Li and his family initially came from nothing, forcing Baldy Li to fight for his success as an entrepreneur. It is also considered a coming of age novel as it outlines Baldy Li's life from his early childhood to his later life. There is also love woven throughout the story, not just romantic love but also brotherly and parental love. According to Hua Li, the author Yu Hua has a reoccurring trend of including premature death for his characters.

Apathy

The Cultural Revolution seems to be a close friend of Yu Hua for his novelistic creation. In Part 1, the death, violence, and tragedy are written in relation to the well-known political movements of the 60s to 70s. However, Yu Hua, instead of depicting the cruelty of the movement itself, demonstrates more about relentless humanity during the movement. "They are not human!", "How can people be this vicious?" - says Mama Su as the character who witnesses Song Fanping's death - might represent what Yu Hua wants to point out here. That said, Yu Hua incarnates as Mama Su, to lash out the ruthlessness of people (human nature) during the Cultural Revolution.

Farce

Farce is massively depicted in the novel, especially in Part 2. Some novelistic events such as the lawsuit between Baldy Li and the women with whom he slept, the Virgin Beauty Competition with the hymen economy, and Song Gang's breast surgery with the goal of selling the boobs bust-enhancing cream are all farce. The events of farce can be seen as the demonstration of absurdity, and the absurdity is the basis of the real-world scenario. For instance, Yu Hua's depiction of the Virgin Beauty Competition was inspired by the real-life farce of "beauty-pageant fever" during China's early opening-up. This is to say, the novel of massive farce is the combination of both reality and absurdity to demonstrate the distorted and money-oriented human nature during the early period of China's opening up.

Negative Portrayals of China & Politics

Yu has not been shy in his dissent for China's policies and corruption, even admitting "I stipulate in all my contracts that my manuscripts can't be touched editorially; not a word can be taken out. That's because there's a lot of politically sensitive material in there." Much of his distaste is masked in his novels through literary devices such as understatement, humour, inversion, self-mockery, ambivalent satire and subtle irony. For example, Baldy Li mimics a party secretary, in order to borrow the Chinese Communist Party's organizational system in running his business.

== Characters ==
Main Characters.

- Baldy Li（李光头）: Li Lan's biological son and Song Gang's younger stepbrother. His real name is "Li Guang." As a child, he gets caught while peeping at women's bottoms at a restroom. Through various events in the story (part1 & part2), he eventually becomes the richest merchant in the Liu town and the nation's premier tycoon. (Note: While writing his protagonist, Yu Hua did not anticipate his writing to eventually lead him to create Baldy Li as a rich and successful man)
- Song Gang（宋钢）: Song Fanping's biological son, Baldy Li's elder stepbrother and Lin Hong's devoted husband. His loyal and stubborn characteristics are partly opposite to those of Baldy Li. Throughout the story, he endures injury, illness, and hardships while trying to earn money for Lin Hong. He follows Wondering Zhou out of Liu Town in the hope of making a fortune. Upon returning to Liu Town, he learns of Lin Hong's affair with Baldy Li and commits suicide at the train track.
- Lin Hong（林红）: The Liu Town no. 1 beauty. Her butt is peeped by young Baldy Li along with three other women's. She becomes Baldy Li's "loved one" in part 2, but she marries Song Gang and stays as a devoted wife until she gets sexual affairs with Baldy Li while Song Gang is out of town. After Song Gang's death, she opens a beauty salon and turns it into a prostitution business.
- Li Lan（李兰）: Baldy Li's biological mother. She is initially widowed when her first husband (Baldy Li's biological father) drowned in a cesspool, peeping women's bottoms. After a brief happy marriage with Song Fanping, she becomes widowed again when her second husband (Song Fanping) is beaten to death by the revolutionaries while she is in Shanghai to get her migraine treated. She later dies of uremia at her old age.
- Song Fanping（宋凡平) : Song Gang's biological father, and Baldy Li's stepfather. Initially a widower, he remarries Li Lan, with whom he shows his devoted love to until death. He is locked up by the revolutionaries during the Cultural Revolution being in a family line of landlords, and is eventually beaten to death as he escapes the detainment warehouse to pick up Li Lan from Shanghai. He is remembered as a "real man" by the people of Liu Town.

Other Characters.

- Success Liu（刘成功）: Has many nicknames including Writer Liu, CEO Liu, Deputy Liu and PR Liu, which reflects his transition into various roles throughout his life. As a teen, he bullies Baldy Li and Song Gang with Victory Zhao and Sun Wei. He is later beaten to hospitalization by grown-up Baldy Li. He contributes to Baldy Li's business and helps him gain nationwide fame by writing a tortured love story about him. Eventually becomes Baldy Li's spokesman.
- Victory Zhao（赵胜利）: Also known as Poet Zhao. An opportunistic character. He catches a young Baldy Li peeping on women's butts. In his jealousy towards Success Liu, from benefiting from Baldy Li's success, he becomes an assistant to Wandering Zhou. However, he eventually fails to gain Wandering Zhou's trust to continue working as his assistant.
- Sun Wei（孙伟）: Initially a friend of Success Liu and Victory Zhao, and a bully to Baldy Li. Later he becomes friends with Baldy Li when his former friends isolate him for being a landlord's son during the Cultural Revolution. Later murdered by the revolutionaries.
- Tao Qing（陶青）: A man of good will. He carries Song Fanping's corpse for the young Baldy Li and Song Gang. Remembering Li Lan's plea to take care of her son, he hires Baldy Li into the welfare factory he built. Later promoted to the higher government position becoming the County Governor.
- Wandering Zhou（周游）: Inspired by Baldy Li's success, he sets off to find business opportunities and returns with fake hymens for the virgin beauty contestants. He accompanies Song Gang to sell products and eventually returns to Liu Town without Song Gang upon learning that Missy Su gave birth to his daughter. Later changes his own nickname to "Wanderless Zhou"(周不游）.
- Little Scissors Guan（小关剪刀）: Also inspired by Baldy Li, he leaves Liu Town and never returns. Runs into Song Gang in Hainan Island and advises Song Gang to go back before he loses interest in returning.
- Yanker Yu（余拔牙）: First appears as the best dentist in the Liu town. During the cultural revolution period, classified patients' teeth as good teeth and anti-revolutionary teeth. He becomes a remarkable stockholder of Baldy Li's company, interested in traveling around the world and do protesting.
- Ice Pops Wang（王冰棍）: Liu town's ice pops seller, not very rich at the beginning. He became another remarkable stockholder of Baldy Li's company, a conservative people criticized by Dentist Yu who doesn't know fashion trends.
- Blacksmith Tong（童铁匠）: Liu town's blacksmith who is relatively smarter than the other characters, also a man who want Lin Hong's butt story. He became a big supermarket owner after failing to cooperate with Baldy Li's company through stock purchasing. When he gets old, he becomes a long-term custom of Lin Hong's salon (prostitution place).
- Mama Su（苏妈）: A kind Buddhism-belief woman who offers several helps to Baldy Li and his family, a traditional snack food restaurant owner.

== Translation ==
The novel Brothers was translated to French in 2008 and Italian in 2009, with the American and Spanish versions coming after, in such order, followed by the Hungarian, German and Dutch versions even later. This is an alternative to how Yu Hua's works often got translated as the English version would commonly be published after the European languages, e.g. French, Italian, German were released. The translation from Chinese to English for the English version of Yu Hua's Brothers was a dual effort from Eileen Cheng-yin Chow and Carlos Rojas, with Chow translating part I and Rojas part II, then revising their counterparts work. The story remains consistent with a singular narrative voice, which does not change back and forth between the two translators. The decision to have Eileen Cheng-yin Chow and Carlos Rojas translate the novel from Chinese to English, was due to Yu Hua being unable to translate the novel himself because of a family situation which arose in the period succeeding the Chinese edition's publication.

== Adaptation ==
Unlike To Live, which has been adapted into a film and a television series (Fugui), there is currently no adaptation of the same kind for Brothers, possibly due to its novelistic absurdity and the political sensitivity of speaking about Cultural Revolution. However, Brothers was adopted for a stage play, starring by Xu Zheng who plays Baldy Li. Even though Xu Zheng is quite famous in China and the show was successful in Shanghai, the stage play is lesser known to the public. The novel was also adapted for a stage play in Japan in 2016 that Yu Hua attended the performance and praised the success of the play. The cross-national adaptation indicates the increasing influence and significance of the novel on the international stage of literature.

== Award ==
A French distinction – "Courrier International Prize of the Best Foreign Book" ("Prix Courrier International du Meilleur Livre Étranger" in French) – was awarded to Yu Hua in October 2008 for Brothers. The prize aims to reward a French-translated publication in the form of "an essay, a story or a novel...which would be a testimony of human condition in a given part of the world". This award indicates that Brothers is of representativeness and the significance of showing China's human condition throughout history.

== Reception ==
Due to the particularly politically sensitive subject matter and vulgar language, Yu Hua's novel received generally harsh reviews from Chinese literary critics, despite selling nearly one million copies in China. Yu has not been shy in his dissent for China's policies and corruption, even admitting "I stipulate in all my contracts that my manuscripts can't be touched editorially; not a word can be taken out. That's because there's a lot of politically sensitive material in there." The violent nature of his novels as sparked the "Yu Hua xianxiang" or the Yu Hua Phenomenon, as postmodern narratives begin to display cruelty and descriptive gore. Inversely, the novel managed to receive critical acclaim from English speaking countries, after being released in January 2009.

Between April 2008 and January 2009, less than a year after publication, Yu Hua's Brothers has amassed more than fifty review from newspapers, radio and television programs, in addition to internet sites which ranged from brief to extensive. All of which proclaiming the novel as "exceptional".

Positive Commentary in the Eyes of Chinese Reviewers

- "Brothers seems to be filled with vulgar language, yet it is indeed an artistic expression combined with human beings' extreme depression and indulgence" – by Hong Zhigang
- "...Brothers...is an exact and excellent example of realism, unfolding before readers the reality both straightforwardly and euphemistically" – by Chen Sihe (Professor of Literature at Fudan University)

David Barboza of The New York Times noted in September 2006 that while many in China had panned the novel, others had "praised the work as a compelling picture of an increasingly materialistic, self-indulgent and even unhinged society. 'I basically disagree with the critics,' said Liu Kang, a professor of Chinese cultural studies at Duke University. 'This is a tremendous book. And Yu Hua is really one of the best Chinese contemporary writers.'" In addition to this, despite the harsh criticism of the novel in China, it was received exceptionally well in France.

Positive Commentary in the Eyes of Anglophone Reviewers

- In the eyes of Anglophone reviewers, Brothers is praised as "a masterful novel" with the "combination of broad caricature and earnest realism, vulgarity and pointed satire" via "boundless imagination", "tremendous narrative technique", "and Yu Hua's flair for the macabre". To make a long story short, the subject matter, the writing technique, and the plot imagination of the novel are all laudable. In Yubin Quan's analysis of the Anglophone reviews, found that most commentary was fixated on the commentary towards the Cultural Revolution, rather than the violence often depicted in Yu Hua's novels.
- New York Times author Jess row describes part one of the novel as a "sentimental-family-cum-epic romance" while the second novel delves into "a broad historical satire."

Negative Commentary in General

- Most critics, whether in the eyes of Chinese or Anglophone reviewers, attack Brothers "as vulgar, simplistic, and immoral" with "numerous contents...that cannot hold water". Others condemn the novel "as lowbrow and crass", which is as "rough and absurd...as a tear-jerking soap opera" with a "trashy, Hollywood-style portrait of the country". The writing strategies such as "artificial plotting", "hyperbolic, facetious or overemphatic tone", and "flat characterization" are also criticized. Even though both Chinese and English reviewers share the similarity of criticism, Chinese critics are way more than English critics.
