= Chronicle of a Blood Merchant (film) =

- Theatrical release poster
- Hangul: 허삼관
- Hanja: 許三觀
- RR: Heosamgwan
- MR: Hŏsamgwan
- Directed by: Ha Jung-woo
- Screenplay by: Kim Ju-ho; Ha Jung-woo; Yoon Jong-bin
- Based on: Chronicle of a Blood Merchant by Yu Hua
- Produced by: Ahn Dong-kyu; Go Seung-hee
- Starring: Ha Jung-woo; Ha Ji-won
- Cinematography: So Jung-oh
- Edited by: Kim Sang-bum; Kim Jae-bum
- Music by: Kim Jeong-beom
- Distributed by: Next Entertainment World
- Release date: January 15, 2015
- Running time: 123 minutes
- Country: South Korea
- Language: Korean
- Budget: US$9.2 million
- Box office: US$6.6 million

Chronicle of a Blood Merchant (Korean: 허삼관; RR: Heosamgwan) is a 2015 South Korean drama film based on the 1995 Chinese novel of the same title by Yu Hua. The film, set in 1950s Korea, was co-written and directed by Ha Jung-woo, who also starred in the film alongside Ha Ji-won.

== Plot ==
Set in a village right after the Korean War, poor but good-hearted Heo Sam-gwan sets out to win the most beautiful girl in the village, Heo Ok-ran, by selling his blood to earn money. Years later, the two are happily married with three children, but their family undergoes a crisis when Sam-gwan's eldest son doesn't resemble him and rumors spread about the boy's paternity.

== Cast ==
- Ha Jung-woo as Heo Sam-gwan
- Ha Ji-won as Heo Ok-ran
- Nam Da-reum as Heo Il-rak
- Noh Kang-min as Heo Yi-rak
- Cheon Hyeon-seok as Heo Sam-rak
- Jeon Hye-jin as Ms. Song
- Jang Gwang as Mr. Choi
- Min Moo-je as Ha So-yong
- Joo Jin-mo as Uncle
- Sung Dong-il as Mr. Bang
- Jung Man-sik as Mr. Shim
- Cho Jin-woong as Mr. Ahn
- Kim Sung-kyun as Geun-ryong
- Kim Jae-young as Mr. Jo
- Lee Ji-hoon as Mr. Gye
- Kim Young-ae as Gye-hwa's mother
- Lee Geung-young as Ok-ran's father
- Kim Byung-ok
- Jung Ui-kap as Ascetic Moon
- Choi Kyu-hwan as Postman
- Kim Gi-cheon as Elder Dae-ji
- Min Kyeong-jin as Elder Jang-ki
- Jo Seon-mook as Restaurant owner
- Hwang Bo-ra as Gye-hwa
- Lee Seung-joon as Dongdaemun Jeil hospital security guard 1
- Yoon Eun-hye as Im Boon-bang (cameo)

== Reception ==
=== Box office ===
The film opened on January 15, 2015, placing fourth at the South Korean box office. It grossed ₩4.59 billion (US$4.26 million) from 582,000 admissions in its first five days. At the end of its theatrical run, it had a total gross of ₩7,405,659,269 from 955,206 admissions.

=== Accolades ===
Year	Award	Category	Recipients	Result
2015	15th Gwangju International Film Festival	Excellent Asia-Pacific Young Director Award	Ha Jung-woo	Nominated
2016	11th Max Movie Awards	Best New Actor	Nam Da-reum	Nominated
