= Andrew F. Jones =

American sinologist and ethnomusicologist (born 1969)

- Born: Andrew Fredrick Jones; June 24, 1969 (age 57)
- Occupations: Academic; non-fiction writer; translator; university professor
- Awards: Guggenheim Fellowship (2015)

Academic background
- Education: Harvard University; University of California, Berkeley (PhD)
- Thesis: Popular Music and Colonial Modernity in China, 1900–1937 (1997)
- Doctoral advisor: Lydia H. Liu
- Influences: Edgar Snow; Stuart Hall

Academic work
- Discipline: Sinology; Ethnomusicology
- Institutions: University of California, Berkeley

Andrew Fredrick Jones (born June 24, 1969) is an American sinologist, ethnomusicologist, writer and translator. He is the Agassiz Professor of Chinese Endowed Chair at the University of California, Berkeley and a Guggenheim Fellow. Jones is best known as the author of a trilogy of books on contemporary Chinese music, Like a Knife (1992), Yellow Music (2001) and Circuit Listening (2020), and as a translator of the fiction of Yu Hua and Eileen Chang. He is also the writer of Developmental Fairy Tales (2011), an interdisciplinary monograph on Chinese engagement with evolutionary theory across literature, popular science and 20th-century cultural discourse.

== Early life ==
=== 1969–1982: family and education ===
Andrew F. Jones was born on June 24, 1969 in the United States and grew up in northern California. As a child, he often listened to reggae records bought in Jamaica when he and his parents visited their family; he has since cited this as marking the beginning of his interest in ethnomusicology. Jones first gained an interest in Chinese history reading about the Communist Revolution, naming Edgar Snow's Red Star Over China (1937) as a particular influence. In 1982, aged 13, he attended a summer exchange program in China and began to learn Mandarin Chinese.

=== 1988–1997: Harvard, Peking and Berkeley ===
Jones attended Harvard University, majoring in East Asian Languages and Civilizations and studying Chinese and Japanese literature. There, he also took an interest in British cultural studies, especially the work of Marxist sociologist Stuart Hall. In 1988, Jones won a scholarship to Peking University to study Chinese Language and Literature. At Peking, he close read the 18th-century Chinese vernacular novel Dream of the Red Chamber. This time also marked the beginning of his preoccupation with contemporary Chinese music, as he became active in the Beijing rock and roll scene during Cui Jian's rise to popularity. The political and cultural moment in which Jones was a participant culminated in 1989 with the Tiananmen Square incident. On this subject, Jones wrote a piece of journalism for the Harvard student magazine Perspective, winning Rolling Stone's College Journalism Award in 1990. The same year, he returned to China to conduct research for his graduating dissertation, which would later become his first book, Like a Knife.

Jones graduated from Harvard in 1992, publishing Like a Knife the same year. He then enrolled as a postgraduate student at the University of California, Berkeley, but returned for a time to Harvard as an exchange scholar in 1995. Jones graduated from Berkeley in 1997 with a PhD from the Department of East Asian Languages and Cultures. His dissertation, "Popular Music and Colonial Modernity in China, 1900–1937", supervised by Lydia H. Liu, would form the basis of his second book, Yellow Music.

== Books ==
=== Like a Knife (1992) ===
In 1992, Cornell University Press published Jones's first book, Like a Knife: Ideology and Genre in Contemporary Chinese Popular Music. The text is based on interviews given to Jones by both musicians of the tongsu (state-sanctioned popular music) and yaogun (rock and roll music) genres. Like a Knife is the first English-language study on the emergence of yaogun and its dichotomy with tongsu.

=== Yellow Music (2001) ===
Jones's next book, Yellow Music: Media Culture and Colonial Modernity in the Chinese Jazz Age, was published by Duke University Press in 2001. The text explores yellow music (Chinese, western-influenced popular music dating from the 1920s to 1940s, referred to as shidai qu or "modern songs"), with reference to the influence of White Russian and Jewish émigrés whom Pathé Records employed in Shanghai at the time. Yellow Music likewise identifies the influence of African American jazz musicians such as Buck Clayton, who began his career as a bandleader in Shanghai, on the emergence of contemporary Chinese music. Jones also writes at length on the musical artist Li Jinhui, explicating his usage of children's music to further his aim of rendering Mandarin Chinese the default national language.

=== Developmental Fairy Tales and The Discovery of the Child (2011) ===
Out of his research into Li, and other intellectuals of the May Fourth Movement such as Lu Xun, Jones began to write his third book, Developmental Fairy Tales: Evolutionary Thinking and Modern Chinese Culture. The interdisciplinary text, published by Harvard University Press in 2011, argues that the groundwork for the liberalization of the Chinese economy during the chairmanship of Deng Xiaoping had its intellectual roots in late 19th-century Chinese translations of early works on evolutionary thought, written by figures such as Jean-Baptiste Lamarck, Charles Darwin and Herbert Spencer. Furthermore, that these approaches became vernacularized, reframing notions of pedagogy, literary modernity and science within a popular imagination concerned with the "recapitulation of civilizational ascent". For example, among other things, Developmental Fairytales responds to Huang Yi's text Psychological Understandings of Children's Drawings (1937), challenging his schema of developmental psychology wherein children's drawings are merely representations of a child's development towards realism.

The same year, Jones and fellow sinologist Xu Lanjun co-edited The Discovery of the Child: the Problem of the Child in Modern Chinese Literature and Culture [《儿童的发现 — 现代中国文学及文化中的儿童问题》], published by Peking University Press in Chinese.

=== Circuit Listening (2020) ===
In 2012, Jones was a visiting fellow at the University of Cambridge's Centre for Research in the Arts, Social Sciences and Humanities (CRASSH). During this time he worked on his fifth book and third text on Chinese contemporary music, Circuit Listening: Electric Folk Music and the Chinese 1960s. Jones had been urged to write on Red music by his friend, the novelist Yu Hua. This idea was the basis of the examination of mid-century Chinese music on which Circuit Listening focuses. The text was published by the University of Minnesota Press in 2020.

=== China Sounds Across Borders (2026) ===
In 2026, Jones, Andrew Steen and Frederick C. Lau, co-edited China Sounds Across Borders: Migration, Mobility, and Modernity, published by Chinese University of Hong Kong.

== Awards ==
- In 2012, the Modern Language Association (MLA) awarded Andrew F. Jones's Developmental Fairy Tales (2011) with an Honourable Mention when selecting for the James Russell Lowell Prize.
- In 2015, Jones was named a Guggenheim Fellow in the field of East Asian studies.

== Personal life ==
Jones is a linguist familiar with Chinese, Japanese, French and Portuguese as well as Jamaican Patois in addition to his native English.

== Bibliography ==
As author or editor
Year	Title	Publisher	ISBN	Pages	Note
1992	Like a Knife: Ideology and Genre in Contemporary Chinese Popular Music	Cornell University Press	978-0-939657-57-5	192	As part of the Cornell East Asia series.
2001	Yellow Music: Media Culture and Colonial Modernity in the Chinese Jazz Age	Duke University Press	978-0-8223-2685-4	224	
2011	Developmental Fairy Tales: Evolutionary Thinking and Modern Chinese Culture	Harvard University Press	978-0-674-04795-2	272	MLA James Russell Lowell Prize Honorable Mention.
2011	《儿童的发现 — 现代中国文学及文化中的儿童问题》[The Discovery of the Child: the Problem of the Child in Modern Chinese Literature and Culture]	Peking University Press	978-7-301-18655-8	269	In Chinese; co-edited with Xu Lanjun.
2020	Circuit Listening: Chinese Popular Music in the Global 1960s	University of Minnesota Press	978-1-5179-0207-0	304	
2026	China Sounds Across Borders: Migration, Mobility, and Modernity	Chinese University of Hong Kong Press	978-9-882-37386-0	420	Co-edited with Andrew Steen and Frederick C. Lau.

As translator
Year	Title	Author	Publisher	ISBN	Pages	Note
1996	The Past and the Punishments: Eight Stories	Yu Hua	University of Hawaiʻi Press	978-0-8248-1817-3	336	As part of the Fiction from Modern China series.
2003	Chronicle of a Blood Merchant	Yu Hua	Pantheon Books	978-0-375-42220-1	263	
2005	Written on Water	Eileen Chang	Columbia University Press	978-1-68137-576-2	272	Co-edited by Jones and Nicole Huang. Revised translation published by New York Review of Books, 2023.

=== Journal issues as guest editor ===
- The Afro-Asian Century, with Nikhil Pal Singh, Positions, vol. 11, no. 1 (2003).

=== Translations of lyrics ===
Jones is also a translator of the lyrics of Taiwanese singer-songwriter and activist Lin Sheng Xiang, including the albums Planting Trees (2006), Village Besieged (2015), and Kafka on the Rivers-and-Lakes (2022).
