= Yu Hua =

Chinese writer (born 1960)

- 余华
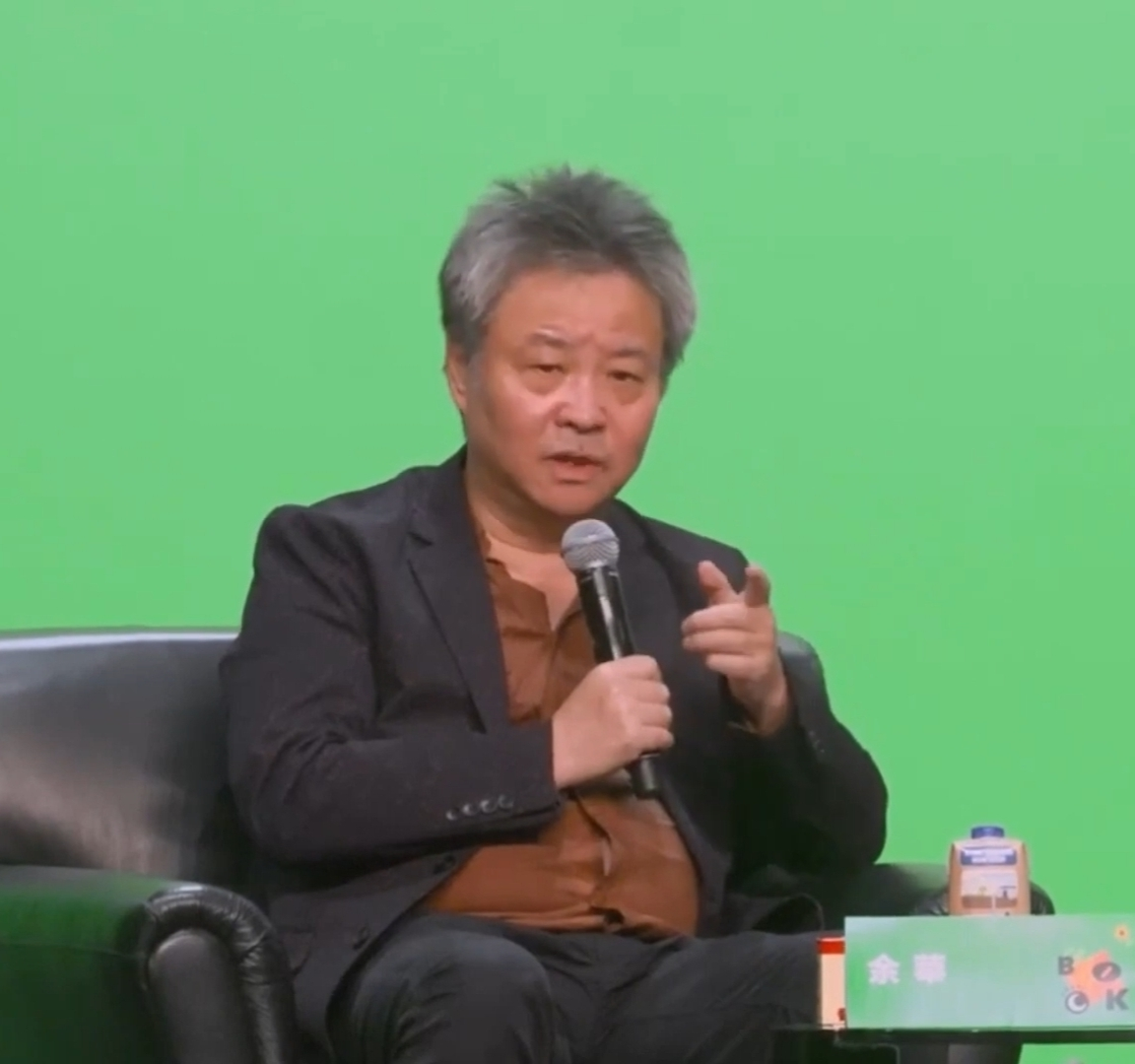
- Yu Hua speaks at the 2023 Hong Kong Book Fair
- Born: 3 April 1960 (age 66); Hangzhou, Zhejiang, China
- Education: Lu Xun Literature School
- Occupations: Novelist, essayist
- Relatives: Father: Hua Zizhi (华自治); Mother: Yu Peiwen (余佩文)
- Writing career
- Language: Chinese
- Period: 1984 – present
- Genres: Novel, prose
- Notable works: To Live (1993); Chronicle of a Blood Merchant (1995); Brothers (2005–2006); Cries in the Drizzle
- Notable awards: 5th Zhuang Zhongwen Literary Prize; 1992; James Joyce Award; 2002; Ordre des Arts et des Lettres; 2004
- Movement: Avant-garde

Yu Hua (simplified Chinese: 余华; traditional Chinese: 余華; pinyin: Yú Huá; born 3 April 1960) is a Chinese novelist, essayist, and short story writer. He is widely considered one of the greatest living authors in China.

Shortly after his debut as a fiction writer in 1983, his first breakthrough came in 1987, when he released the short story "On the Road at Age Eighteen". Yu Hua was regarded as a promising avant-garde or post-New Wave writer. Many critics also regard him as a champion for Chinese meta-fictional or postmodernist writing. His novels To Live (1993) and Chronicle of a Blood Merchant (1995) were widely acclaimed. Other works like Brothers (2005–06) received mixed reviews domestically, but positive reviews abroad.

Yu Hua has written five novels, six collections of stories, and three collections of essays, which have collectively sold nine million copies and have been translated into over 20 languages.

== Background ==
Yu was born in Hangzhou, Zhejiang, on 3 April 1960. Yu Hua's parents worked as doctors, so his family lived in a hospital compound across from the mortuary. His childhood proximity to death shaped his later works. He practiced dentistry for five years before turning to fiction writing in 1983 because he didn't like "looking into people's mouths the whole day." For Yu Hua, the Cultural Revolution took place from the ages of seven to seventeen. It is for this reason that many of his works include the violence and chaos that were prevalent at the time. In his own words, "a calm, orderly society cannot produce such great works," which is why one of the distinctive characteristics of his work is his penchant for detailed descriptions of brutal violence.

== Career ==
Yu published the short story "Star", his first work of fiction, in 1984 and followed it up with a string of short stories, like "On the Road at Eighteen", "1986", "Mistakes by the River" and "Classical Love", which have been described as standing out for "their brutal matter-of-fact depictions of violence". This period gained him a reputation as an avant-garde writer.

In the early 1990s however, Yu pivoted from formally experimental short fiction to the novel, adopting a more traditional narrative style. Screaming in the Drizzle (1991) was followed by To Live, originally published in 1992 in the Shanghai literary journal Harvest, which is where Zhang Yimou read it, before deciding to adap it into a film of the same name. Based on a screenplay co-written by Yu, Zhang and screenwriter Lu Wei, the film went on to be a major critical success but was also banned in China, making the novel an instant best-seller. 1995 saw the publication of Yu's third novel, Chronicle of a Blood Merchant. After Chronicle, Yu has pivoted once again, this time to the essay, mostly concerning childhood memories, biographical portraits, literature and music.

In recent years, Yu Hua has dedicated many of his works about China itself, both aimed at China and East Asia, and then also the Western world. He also writes a monthly column for The New York Times in which he describes issues about China. Many of his writings have been known for their violence, but he is also known for some of his more intimate style. For example, he stated in an interview that the book "To Live" addresses "the cruelty and violence of the Cultural Revolution," but that he also has "milder stories" like "The Boy in Twilight." One of the key aspects of his writing is in dealing with the absurd. In an interview, he stated that "I am a realistic writer, and if my stories are often absurd, that's simply because they are a projection of absurd realities." As China has changed, he has started writing about the absurdities that come with it. In answering the criticisms that his writing is too violent, he responds that he is reflecting what he sees in reality, stating that "violence has long existed in my subconscious."

== Writing style, themes and avant-garde ==
Yu Hua is interested in the interplay of diverse meaning constructions, particularly between imagination and reality. Yu Hua's personal life is deeply reflected in his writing as a direct influence from the socio-economic challenges throughout his youth. There are many elements in Yu Hua's writings that could have been influenced by his life. He is considered to belong to the "generation of the 60s," which refers to writers that spend their whole childhood and teenage years during the Cultural Revolution.

Yu Hua has stated that his writing has been heavily influenced by both Franz Kafka and Yasunari Kawabata, among others. He stated that by reading Kawabata's work, he understood that the point of writing was to show human feelings. However, there is also a deep connection that Yu Hua has with his country and its history. His writing reflects that. In an interview with The New Yorker, he stated that, "My writing is always changing, because my country is always changing, and this inevitably affects my views and feelings about things."

Yu Hua was born in Hangzhou, but he spent his formative years in the Wuyuan Township in Haiyan, a small town that has been thought to be fairly monotonous, but much of Yu Hua's writing uses it as the setting behind his characters. Yu Hua has stated that writing makes him feel like he is going back to Haiyan; thus, many of Yu Hua's writing uses Haiyan as a story setting. After failing to enter the university, Yu Hua took a one-year program to become a dentist. He was a dentist for 6 years but then started writing more seriously when he grew bored of that lifestyle.

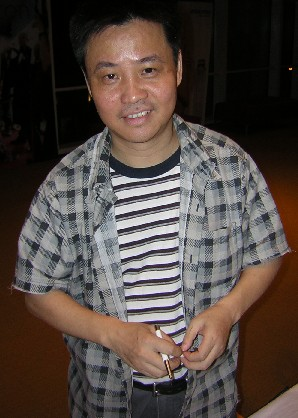
Yu Hua at the 2005 Singapore Writers Festival

Yu Hua's personal life was heavily influenced by the changes that China has gone through, which is perhaps why many of his early texts often portray the world as cold and ruthless, marked by graphic descriptions of physical violence and bodily mutilation. He stated in an interview that he grew up in a time when China went through many different changes in a relatively short period of time. He said, "I grew up during the Cultural Revolution. Then came Reform and Opening and the economy's explosive takeoff in the 90s, and then came the fantastic wildness of the new century and our worldview and our value system were both turned upside down." He has also said that childhood experiences will impact the life of a writer.

=== Themes ===
Heavily inspired and affected by the Cultural Revolution, the theme of modern Chinese history is prevalent in Yu Hua's writing. Yu Hua's work is very traditional, with psychologized storylines that investigate and illustrate the challenges of cultural disintegration and identity loss and his stories are often set in small towns during historical periods that he experienced including China under Chairman Mao's rule, the Civil War and Cultural Revolution, and post Mao capitalist China. Childhood is also a theme which appears often in his stories, but does not consequently lighten the subject matter. Yu Hua is known for his brutal descriptions of violence, cruelty and death as well as themes surrounding "the plight of China's underclasses" as seen in Chronicle of a Blood Merchant. When he began focusing on more chaotic themes in Brothers, Yu Hua admitted his belief that despite his past modeling after Kafka's novels, "the essential nature of writing was to free yourself. If the great masters can unfetter themselves, why can't we?" In this same work, he prides himself on his simultaneous expression of tragedy and comedy. Yu Hua also frequently engages in diverse attitudes of aesthetic modernity in his works, earning him the reputation of being a catalyst.

=== Style ===
Yu Hua has been influenced by magic realism and also incorporates pre-modern Chinese fiction elements into his work. He is known to use dark humour and strange modes of perception and description in his writing. The linguistic humour of Yu Hua's novels is gray humour in extreme contrast, a kind of zero-degree emotional narration, and this humour often receives a surprisingly effective expression. He creates humour mainly through the context, the situation, the context of the times, and the national cultural tradition. He has been influenced by music, with a particular interest in classical, and the narrative structure of music; in fact, Chronicle of a Blood Merchant uses techniques borrowed from Yue opera's style. He constantly draws from musical works when he composes his novels, using the characteristics of musical language to enrich his writing, thus making his fictional language full of musical rhythms, which is closely related to Yu Hua's musical literacy and musical hobbies. He also gained inspiration for his literary creation from musical pieces. For example, repetition of words is a narrative style Yu Hua favours. It is an important method for him to portray his characters' character traits and psychological changes, achieving a focused and concise language expression through the clever use of repetitive language techniques.

Yu Hua's work has been successful at constructing mysterious and rich literary universes in both fiction and non-fiction. As Yu Hua has said, "Inevitably the novel involves China's history, but I don't intend to present history. My responsibility and interest as a writer lie in creating real people in my work, real Chinese people."

In the beginning of his career, he was not successful at gaining traction with readers due to the complexity of his work. He aimed to demonstrate the dark side of human psychology and society in a non-traditional way. He changed his style after he started to gain traction in the writing world and adjusted his work away from over-complexity due to readers finding his work difficult to understand. After his adjustments, he focused on injecting the right amount of modern ideologies into his work, which is primarily constructed on the narration of "realistic societies".

=== Avant-garde ===
Yu Hua is a contemporary avant-garde writer formally introduced to the literary world with the publication of "On the Road at Eighteen". This short story takes pains to highlight what the narrator sees, thinks and feels in moments of confusion and cruelty. It describes the feeling that the world has shredded its own integrity, and thus unveils a broken traditional view of reality based on surrealism.

Among avant-garde novelists, Yu Hua is often noted for combining elements of the absurd with depictions of violence to explore questions related to humanism. His writing is characterized by a precise and restrained style. Rather than presenting an idealized vision of happiness, his work frequently examines the contrast between outward appearances of ordinary life and more complex inner experiences. In doing so, his novels depart from some traditional narrative approaches and aesthetic conventions, contributing to developments in contemporary Chinese literature.

Yu Hua has deepened the rational reflection of human beings on the situation of their lives in the form of novels, which has caused a lot of shock and attention in the literary world and among the readers. Therefore, he has become the representative of the avant-garde novels in China. In the late 1980s, Yu Hua was regarded as one of the most promising avant-garde or post-trendy writers, and many critics considered him perhaps the best example of Chinese yuan novels or post-modern writing. In the late 1990s, he plowed through a series of short stories, novellas and novels in which his style seemed to shift slightly toward the traditional "psychoanalytic" narrative.

Yu Hua's novels in this period make a deep and detailed analysis of human evil and violence, instinct and desire, tradition and history. It mainly reveals the evil of human nature and a series of cruel, violent and bloody events caused by the evil of human nature. "1986", "One Kind of Reality", "The Inevitable" and other early works are his almost brutal indifference tone of the real and detailed fictional violence, blood and death, so as to show the human nature of violence, desire and the desire of the impulse. Yu Hua is to remove the modification of this kind of human nature, for the reader to open a pry human blood dripping window, to let the reader understand this is not in the meaning of the vacancy.

== Works ==
Note: titles have been translated into English from the original Mandarin Chinese.

=== Short story collections ===
Originally published in literary journals, these stories were subsequently anthologized in different collections in both Taiwan and mainland China. The most complete collection of his stories to date is I Don't Have My Own Name (2017), including 21 stories. It features his most notable short stories such as "Leaving Home at Eighteen", "Classical Love", "World Like Mist", "The Past and the Punishments", "1986", "Blood and Plum Blossoms", "The Death of a Landlord", and "Boy in the Twilight" along with 13 other works. Other anthologies with these works include The April 3rd Incident (2018), translated by Allan H. Barr; The Past and the Punishments (1996), translated by Andrew F. Jones; Boy in the Twilight (2014), translated by Allan H. Barr; On the Road at Eighteen (1991); Summer Typhoon (1993); Shudder (1995); and the three volumes of Yu Hua's Collected Works (1994), among others.

=== Novels ===
- Cries in the Drizzle (1992): In Yu Hua's first published novel, which is a first-person reminiscence of the protagonist Sun Guanglin in China under the reign of Mao. As a black sheep in society and his own family, he observes the consequences of Communist rule from a unique perspective of a resentful teenager. Readers are given a chance to revisit the meanings of family, friendship, marriage, fate, sex and birth through a child's perspective. The formatting and style of Yu Hua's first published level can be described as a "serpentine, episodic collection of anecdotes forming a kind of Maoist-era kinderscenen."
- To Live (1993): An exaggerated realist fiction depicts the protagonist Xu Fugui has been constantly suffering in his life. Yu Hua's breakthrough novel follows the transformation of a landlord's spoiled son witnessing the brutality and hardships of the Civil War and Cultural Revolution. The body of the book is formatted by the main character, Fugui, recounting his story to an unnamed narrator in the 1980s, while the story itself takes place between the Second-Sino Japanese War until the death of his last remaining relative. In order of appearance, his relatives are his parents, his wife Jiazhen, daughter Fengxia, son Youqing, son-in-law Erxi, and his only grandchild Kugen who is the last to die. Over the events of the book that follows the historical timeline of China under rule of Mao Zedong and the Cultural Revolution, which lead to the many deaths in Fu Gui's family as they experience poverty, illness, and the malpractice of medicine. The novel was originally banned in China due to its exaggerated realism writing style but was later named one of that nation's most influential books.
- Chronicle of a Blood Merchant (1995) follows a struggling cart-pusher and portrays the hardships of life under the leadership of Mao's China. Xu Sanguan, the cart-pusher, partakes in the illicit act of selling his blood to support his dysfunctional family during a period of famine from the Cultural Revolution. As the story develops, Xu Sanguan must put aside his bitterness towards his wife Xu Yulan and the illegitimate son she gave birth to, Yile, under the guise that he was Xu Sanguan's child. The title Chronicle of a Blood Merchant refers to China's Plasma Economy that took place in the years that Yu Hua was writing his sophomore novel.
- Brothers (2005): Described as "an epic and wildly unhinged black comedy of modern Chinese society running amok", Brothers consists of two volumes following the childhood of two step-brothers during the Cultural Revolution and life in post-Mao, capitalist China. Baldy Li is the protagonist, a town scoundrel that evolves into the nation's top entrepreneur. His rags to riches story opposes that of his step-brother Song Gang, who although is known for being so similar to his chivalrous and smart father, gets hit by the brunt of the Cultural Revolution and suffers as a wandering man who partakes in unlicensed cosmetic surgery practices in South China. These cosmetic surgeries eventually influence Baldy Li's newly established beauty pageant, that only virgins can participate in. Over the many decades of the novel, Baldy Li begins an affair with Song Gang's wife, Lin Hong, who he has admired for years. Later, the brothers are united to resolve their differences. The book was inspired by Yu Hua's trip to the United States in 2003, during which he observed China prepare for hosting the Miss World competition from afar.
- The Seventh Day (2015): Yu Hua's most recent novel takes the deceased as the protagonist and depicts what the deceased saw and heard within seven days after death. Yu Hua portrays an absurd and desperate real world and an afterlife opposite to it. The protagonist Yang Fei died at the age of forty-one without adequate money for a burial plot, is left to aimlessly roam the afterworld as a ghost. Over the course of seven days, he encounters the souls of friends, family and acquaintances who died before him. Through the narrative and experience of the deceased, the novel exposes the cruel and corrupt realities, such as men disguised in females in prostitution, violent demolition, post-disaster concealment of the death toll, the hospital disposes of dead babies as medical wastes, etc. While other facets of human rights that are encroached during Yang Fei's exploration of limbo are police brutality, the violence of the sex industry, suicide, and the forced evictions of those suffering from poverty by the government. Yu Hua "got the idea that death is not the end of life but just a turning point" from living close to a mortuary as a child. The Seventh Day serves as a criticism to the class disparity in China, a disparity that is so severe it continues to exist even in the afterlife, as a result of government corruption and a "country's headlong affair with consumerism". Other facets of human rights that are encroached during Yang Fei's exploration of limbo are police brutality, the violence of the sex industry, suicide, and the forced evictions of those suffering from poverty by the government.

=== Essays ===
- China in Ten Words (2011): In a collection of ten essays, titled after a word he has deemed representative of the culture and politics of modern China, Yu Hua describes a "morally compromised nation," contrasting the Cultural Revolution events with post-Mao China's rapid developments and even discussing the origins of current events and the 1989 pro-democracy protest; Yu Hua did not publish the Chinese version of the essays novel in China. The ten words are "People", "Leader", "Reading", "Writing", "Lu Xun", "Revolution", "Disparity", "Grassroots", "Copycat", and "Bamboozle". Using these words, Yu Hua conducts a recollection of historical and cultural events that have made China what it is today, intermixed with autobiographical accounts of growing up during the Cultural Revolution. Each essay explains why the titular term is particular in order to further understand a controversial China. Yu Hua states that this work is "to bring together observation, analysis, and personal anecdote" for a critique of contemporary China.

== Political views ==
=== Cultural Revolution ===
Most of Yu Hua's novels are centred around the Cultural Revolution, either as the setting, a contextual reference, or as a literary device. Yu Hua was born in 1960, and his childhood memories are the Cultural Revolution. Yu Hua said, "My novel creation is closely related to childhood and juveniles." Yu Hua's description of the Cultural Revolution is indifferent, no matter whether it is describing violence or death. For example, the novel To Live uses an objective narrative style to describe the suffering of the Cultural Revolution. In Brothers, Yu Hua directly talks about what happened to a family during the Cultural Revolution. In these books, we can understand the harm of the Cultural Revolution to human nature and clearly understand the mistakes made during the Cultural Revolution.

== Reception ==
Yu Hua is regarded as one of the greatest living Chinese writers. The University of California, Irvine, professor of History, Jeffrey Wasserstrom, wrote, "When people ask me to suggest a novel dealing with the rise and rule of China's Communist Party, I point them toward To Live, which is available in a lively translation by Michael Berry and presents pivotal stages of revolutionary history from the perspective of everyman characters, or Chronicle of a Blood Merchant, which has similar virtues and a slightly larger quotient of humor".

== Awards ==
Yu Hua received the Grinzane Cavour Prize as his first award in 1998 for his novel To Live. Four years later, Yu Hua became the first Chinese writer to receive the James Joyce Award (2002). Originally published in 1993, To Live was then published in English in 2003 and earned him the Ordre des Arts et des Lettres of France in 2004. That same year, Yu Hua was awarded the Barnes & Noble Discovery Great New Writers Award (2004) and in 2005, took home the Special Book Award of China. Since then, he has also won the Prix Courrier International (2008) for his novel Brothers which was also shortlisted for the Man Asian Literary Prize and won the Best Foreign Language Works Award of the 2022 Yasnaya Polyana Literary Award.

== TV and film adaptations ==
Three of Yu Hua's works have screen adaptations. To Live (1994) was the first one. Zhang Yimou, by then already a famous film director, reached out to Yu about adapting Mistakes by the River (1987) into a film. But after reading Yu's latest book at the time, they chose to adapt To Live instead. Yu even participated in screenwriting. Though the screenplay was greatly altered it was still banned upon initial release. However, To Live swept awards at the 1994 Cannes Film Festival. There are some notable changes between the book and the film: Fugui's career is in shadow puppetry rather than farming and the death of Youqing is from a car accident involving himself and the Magistrate Chunsheng. The same novel was adapted by Zhu Zheng as a television drama in 2003, named after the protagonist "Fu Gui". The movie and novel emphasize two ways of "living" through exposing harsh realities underneath the facade of life and pondering the significance of existing. The television adaptation followed the tragedies in the original storyline more closely, avoiding the casting of big names in order to effectively portray the simplicity of civilian life in revolution era China.

In 2015, Chronicles of a Blood Merchant was adapted into a Korean language film, both directed by and starring Ha Jung-woo.

A film adaptation of Yu Hua's Mistakes by the River directed by Wei Shujun, dubbed Only the River Flows, was released in 2023 and met with wide-spread critical acclaim and became a box office hit.

== Works in translation ==
- The Past and the Punishments 往事与刑罚. Translated by Jones, Andrew F. Honolulu: University of Hawai'i Press. 1996. ISBN 0-8248-1817-2.
- To Live 活着. Translated by Berry, Michael. New York: Anchor Books. 2003. ISBN 978-1-400-03186-3.
- Chronicle of a Blood Merchant 许三观卖血记. Translated by Jones, Andrew F. New York: Pantheon. 2003. ISBN 978-0-375-42220-1.
- Cries in the Drizzle 在细雨中呼喊. Translated by Barr, Allan H. New York: Anchor Books. 2007. ISBN 978-0-307-27999-6.
- Brothers 兄弟. Translated by Chow, Eileen Cheng-yin; Rojas, Carlos. New York: Pantheon. 2009. ISBN 978-0-375-42499-1.
- China in Ten Words 十个词汇里的中国. Translated by Barr, Allan H. New York: Pantheon. 2011. ISBN 978-0-307-37935-1.
- Boy in the Twilight: Stories of the Hidden China 黄昏里的男孩. Translated by Barr, Allan H. New York: Pantheon. 2014. ISBN 978-0-307-37936-8.
- The Seventh Day 第七天. Translated by Barr, Allan H. New York: Pantheon. 2015. ISBN 978-0-804-19786-1.
- The April 3rd Incident 四月三日事件. Translated by Barr, Allan H. New York: Pantheon. 2018. ISBN 978-1-524-74706-0.
- City of Fiction 文城. Translated by Foley, Todd. New York: Europa Editions. 2025. ISBN 979-8-889-66093-4.
