= Boy in the Twilight =

1999 short story collection by Yu Hua

Boy in the Twilight: Stories of the Hidden China is a collection of thirteen short stories written by Yu Hua in the mid-1990s, and published in 1999. The English version, translated by Allan H. Barr, was published in 2014 by Pantheon. This was the sixth work of his that was translated into English. Barr teaches Chinese at Pomona College.

Publishers Weekly stated that the subtitle of the book likely refers to ordinary Chinese people, particularly "unimportant people" and how they think about their circumstances after events of varying dramatic weight occur. Drew Calvert of the Boston Review stated that the focus on ordinary people differs from some novels of Yu Hua focusing on "larger-than-life" and satirizing China that had been previously translated into English. Most of the main characters are male. Aerled Doyle of That's Shanghai stated that even though there was "darkness" present, the book was "not depressing".

Kirkus Reviews stated that the stories were "spare and minimalist" and had "disquieting tension" due to ample amounts of "violence and mistrust". Jonathan Liebson of Time Out New York stated that many of the stories have "the small, subtle gestures of his characters".

== Contents ==
In "Why There Was No Music", a man named Horsie visits his friend Guo Bin and borrows some videotapes from him. Horsie finds on one tape that his wife, Lü Yuan, had sex with Guo Bin. During the story, Lü Yuan is not in the city.

== Reception ==
Amy Russel of the South China Morning Post ranked the book 4.5 out of 5 stars.

Publishers Weekly ranked it as a "PW Pick".

Kirkus Reviews gave a positive review, stating that they were "quite well-composed".

Doyle stated that "This is another fine book from a writer China is lucky to have, and another book that is going to pass the test of time." He stated it was a "pleasure to read".
