= The April 3rd Incident =

The April 3rd Incident is a collection of short stories by Yu Hua, who wrote the stories from 1987 to 1991. The English translation, by Allan H. Barr, was published in 2018 by Pantheon. Barr teaches Chinese at Pomona College.

The stories included are experimental, and Publishers Weekly characterizes the shorter ones as having "devastating wit and morbid humor". Kirkus Reviews described them as "very post-punk and confrontational". Barr stated that Borges, Faulkner, and Kafka had influenced Yu Hua's writing.

The stories allude to an incident that is never clearly defined, not even in the chapter that shares its name with the collection's title; April 3 happens to be the birthday of Yu Hua. The stories include elements of conspiracies, double-crossing, and characters revealing their true natures. Publishers Weekly compares the stories to those of Italo Calvino.

== Contents ==
In the chapter "The April 3rd Incident" the narrator is trying to figure out about an incident that he is unclear about.

In "Death Chronicle" a truck driver trying to do the morally right thing in a possible hit-and-run incident is perceived by outsiders as having malicious intentions. Ten years prior to the events, he had done a hit-and-run incident, killing two people. He had been on a mountain road that was treacherous for drivers. James Kidd of the South China Morning Post describes the truck driver as "gruff" and "self-justifying".

"A History of Two People" talks about two characters having a shared dream even though one is richer than the other, and one is unaware of the true circumstances of the other due to his own status. Jennifer Rothschild of Booklist stated that this shows how two people can progress into different life paths.

== Reception ==
Kidd ranked The April 3rd Incident five of five stars, and concluded that it "reinforces Yu as China's boldest and smartest literary agent provocateur."

Publishers Weekly stated that the series would get a positive reception from new readers and people devoted to Yu Hua's works.

Kirkus Reviews stated that "it's interesting to look back at [Yu Hua's] work when he was at his fiercest."

Rothschild stated that "this challenging collection shows that his literary prowess and mastery were present from the start."
