= The Seventh Day (novel) =

2013 novel by Yu Hua

- First edition cover (China)
- Author: Yu Hua
- Original title: 第七天; Dì qī tiān
- Translator: Allan Hepburn Barr
- Language: Chinese
- Genre: Absurdist fiction
- Set in: China
- Publisher: New Star Press
- Publication date: June 2013
- Publication place: China
- English publication date: 13 January 2015
- Media type: Print (paperback)
- Pages: 232
- ISBN: 978-7-5133-1210-3
- Dewey Decimal: 895.13/52
- LC Class: PL2928.H78 D5 2013

The Seventh Day (Chinese: 第七天; pinyin: Dì qī tiān) is a 2013 novel by Yu Hua. It was published in China by New Star Press in June 2013. An English translation by Allan Hepburn Barr was published by Pantheon Books in January 2015.

Kirkus Reviews stated that Yu Hua "is certainly commenting, often acerbically, on how life and death are valued in contemporary China".

== Background ==
An absurdist fiction novel, The Seventh Day finds Yu Hua comparing the real world to the world of death, and narrating the experiences of the main character, Yang Fei, in the seven days following his death. In The Theory of Yu Hua, Wang points out that The Seventh Day compares the world of life and death. The Seventh Day breaks through the world of life and death, and describes the two completely different worlds.

It is believed that some of the characters' stories (Yang Fei and Yang Jinbiao, Li Yuezhen, Mouse Girl) are based on true stories that were reported in China such as forced relocation, the hospital which treated dead infants as clinical waste, and selling a kidney to buy electronic devices. In the novel, Li Yuezhen exposed that the hospital treated 27 dead infants' remains as clinical waste which was dumped into a nearby river. This is similar to an event that occurred in the Shandong Province, where 21 dead infants' remains was found in the Guangfu river in 2010. In the novel, Wu Chao sells his kidney for money to buy Mouse Girl a new cellphone. This was also similar to news reported in 2012, in Hangzhou, a group of illegal kidney-sellers were exposed by an internet blogger, who went undercover in the group as a kidney seller for fifteen days and later, on May 28, 2012, called the police. During the fifteen days undercover in the house, he recorded his conversations with the kidney-sellers and asked them why were they selling their kidneys. One of them said that he sold his kidney so that he could afford to purchase a new cellphone for his girlfriend, and be able to support his family. In a part of the novel, a man disguised as a woman is caught working as a prostitute. This is similar to an incident reported in the autonomous Guangxi region in 2010, where local police in Liuzhou arrested three people who were engaged in prostitution. The prostitutes were discovered to actually be middle-aged men dressed as women.

== Plot ==
On the first day, after Yang Fei dies, he goes to the funeral parlour to be cremated, but no urn was prepared for him and no cemetery, so he left the waiting hall and tried to recall the last scene before he died. He remembers he was sitting in the Tan Jia Cai restaurant when he read the report of his ex-wife, Li Qing, cutting her wrist at home in the bathtub. At this time, the restaurant kitchen caught fire, and his memory stops with a loud bang.

On the second day, Yang Fei meets his ex-wife, Li Qing, who rejected many suitors to marry him. However, Li Qing divorced him and married a new man because Li Qing wanted higher achievements in her business. They bring up the memory, and Li Qing tells Yang Fei that he was the only husband she had. Finally, she left and rushed to her funeral.

On the third day, Yang Fei continues to wander on the street, he remembers his adoptive father Yang Jinbiao, who found him as a newborn baby at the edge of the railway track. Yang Jinbiao raised him alone and even rejected his girlfriend because of Yang Fei.

One day Yang Fei's biological mother found him and brought him to meet his original family; however, he returned after few days. When Yang Jinbiao found out that he had a disease that would soon kill him, he left secretly. Yang Fei kept looking for his father for a long time. When he returned from his father's hometown, his nursing mother Li Yuezhen was dead.

On the fourth day, Yang Fei meets Mouse Girl. She and her boyfriend Wu Chao were Yang Fei's neighbors in the rental house. Mouse Girl died after jumping off from the top of the Pengfei Building because her boyfriend gave her a fake iPhone 4S as her birthday gift. Mouse Girl leads Yang Fei to the land of unburied, and Yang Fei searches for his father there.

On the fifth day, Yang Fei encounters many familiar people in the land of unburied, including the girl he was going to teach and Tan Jiaxin's family. He meets Li Yuezhen, who tells him that his father is the receptionist at the funeral parlour, and his father actually went to the stone where he left Yang Fei once.

On the sixth day, after Mouse Girl hears Wu Chao's story from Xiao Qing, she learns that Wu Chao sold his kidney to buy her a cemetery. Mouse Girl decides to return to the cemetery Wu Chao bought for her, becoming the first person who left the land of unburied. All the dead at the land of unburied baptize Mouse Girl and walk to the funeral parlour with her.

On the seventh day, Yang Fei finally meets his father at the funeral parlour. On the way he back to the land of unburied, he meets Wu Chao, who is looking for his girlfriend. Yang Fei tells Wu Chao that Mouse Girl went to the cemetery, and Yang Fei brings Wu Chao to the land of unburied.

== Main characters ==
- Yang Fei – an honest and reserved man born on a moving train. He was adopted by a young switchman and raised with love. At the age of 41, Yang died in a gas explosion in a restaurant while reading a news report on his ex-wife Li Qing's death. Having no funeral urn nor grave, he roams around the land of the unburied as a spirit, and encounters his ex-wife, Mouse Girl and her boyfriend, Zhang Gang and Li, Li Yuezhen and 27 infants, and finally his father.
- Yang Jinbiao – Yang Fei's adoptive father, was working as a switchman when he found Yang Fei on the rails. He once abandoned little Yang Fei on a rock near an orphanage in order to please his fiancée, but brought him back on the very next day. Since then this devoted and obstinate father had decided to remain single for good. He spent the last moment of his life besides the rock of abandonment. In the underworld, he works as an usher in the funeral parlour.
- Li Qing – a beautiful, ambitious and wealthy businesswoman who was married to Yang Fei but left for a businessman whom she later found a trickster and womanizer. After breaking up with the businessman, she became a high official's mistress. She committed suicide by slitting her wrists in her bathtub just before the investigators came to arrest her. Then her spirit meets Yang Fei's at the apartment they once had lived together.
- Li Yuezhen – Yang Jinbiao's coworker, who had been helping to nurse and foster Yang Fei with her husband Hao Qiangsheng. As their daughter Hao Xia has emigrated to and had a family in the U.S., the couple planned to move to America. However, Li was run over and killed in a car accident after she stumbled upon a scandal that 27 dead infants were dumped by the hospital into the river as medical refuses. She then meets Yang Fei in the land of the unburied with the 27 babies around her singing a song.
- Mouse Girl – a woman whose name is Liu Mei, had been constantly changing her work as hairwasher, restaurant server and other temporary jobs with her boyfriend Wu Chao and lives in low-rent places like bomb shelters. She jumped off a building because Wu deceived her, claiming that her birthday gift—an iPhone—was a real one when it was a knock-off. After Mouse Girl died, Wu Chao managed to sell his kidney to buy her a burial plot. Therefore, Mouse Girl is the first to leave the land of the unburied for a resting place.
- Tan Jiaxin – the owner of Tan Jia Cai restaurant. Yang Fei was a frequent customer of his restaurant. Tan Jiaxin's family died in the same gas explosion accident in his restaurant as Yang Fei. Tan Jiaxin also opens his restaurant in the land of unburied.
- Xiao Qing – neighbor of Mouse Girl and Wu Chao in the real world. Xiao Qing used the money Wu Chao gave him to buy Mouse Girl a cemetery. Xiao Qing died in a traffic accident on Bus 203.

== Reception ==
Kirkus Reviews stated that it "falls short of being a fully realized novel" and that it is "episodic". It stated that the novel is characterized by a "lugubrious funk" but that "[c]ompelling moments and black humor" mitigate this effect.

Clarissa Sebag-Montefiore of the South China Morning Post stated overall the book "never quite hits the mark". She stated that the "excellently" done translation of the original Chinese "poetic language" partially made up for the negatives in the book, and that it was "darkly funny" and "desperately dark" at the same time. She criticized how characters "are often reduced to totems". She stated that "If Yu does succeed in The Seventh Day, it is in showing a confused society in which the government casts aside its citizens like rubbish and in which people often treat each other no better."

Ken Kalfus states in an article in The New York Times that the translation is "workmanlike" and that it is "too wordy to deliver its best potential laugh lines."

David Der-wei Wang, Professor of Chinese Literature at Harvard University, suggested that Yu Hua used the narrative technique of "defamiliarization" to observe the living world through the eyes of the dead. He also argued Yu Hua did not give full play to the nihilist atmosphere which was the crux of the novel, but only stopped at criticizing social issues.

== Publication history ==
Country	Publication year	Publication	Book name
China	2013 2013 2018	New Star Press （新星出版社） Rye Field Publishing Co. （麦田出版社） New Star Press （新星出版社）	《第七天》 《第七天》 《第七天》
Japan Translated by 飯塚 容	2014	Kawade Shobō Shinsha	死者たちの七日間
France Translated by Angel Pino, Isabelle Rabut	2014	Actes Sud	Le septième jour
America Translated by Allan Hepburn Barr.	2015	Pantheon Books	The Seventh Day
Australia	2015	Text	The Seventh Day
Holland	2016	DEGEUS	De zevende dag
Norway	2016	Aschehoug	Den Sjuende Dagen
Czech Republic	2016	Verzone s.r.o.	Den Sedmý
Slovakia	2016	Marencin PT	Siedmy deň
Arabia	2016	Ebdate Alimayia	اليوم السابع
Turkey	2016	Alabanda	Yedinci Gün
Germany Translated by Ulrich Kautz	2017	S. Fischer Verlag	Die sieben letzten Tage Roman
Italy Translated by Silvia Pozzi	2017	Feltrinelli	Il settimo giorno
Romania Translated by Luminița Bălan.	2020	Humanitas Fiction	Ziua a șaptea
