= Chronicle of a Blood Merchant =

1995 novel by Yu Hua

- 1998 Chinese edition
- Author: Yu Hua
- Original title: 许三观卖血记/許三觀賣血記 – Xǔ Sānguān Mài Xuě Jì
- Translator: Andrew F. Jones
- Language: Chinese
- Genre: Novel
- Publisher: Anchor Books & Random House of Canada Limited
- Publication date: 1995
- Publication place: China
- English publication date: 2003
- Media type: Print (Paperback)
- Pages: 263
- ISBN: 1-4000-3185-0

Chronicle of a Blood Merchant (simplified Chinese: 许三观卖血记; traditional Chinese: 許三觀賣血記; pinyin: Xǔ Sānguān Mài Xuě Jì) is a 1995 novel by Chinese writer Yu Hua. It is his third novel after Cries in the Drizzle and To Live. It is the story of a silk factory worker, Xu Sanguan, who sells his blood over the years, in most cases in an attempt to improve the lives of himself and his family members, and overcome family difficulties. The story is set in the late 1940s until the 1980s, from the early years of the People's Republic of China until after the Cultural Revolution.

The story begins with Xu Sanguan's visit to his grandpa, when he first learns about selling blood. His first time selling blood is to prove his body is in good health. After discovering that selling blood can quickly get him a lot of cash, he begins to sell blood constantly when he and his family struggle with life difficulties. By the end of the story, Xu Sanguan's family no longer lacks cash, and he thus no longer needs to sell blood to support his family.

The space of "folk" in the novel is neatly built by the extensive use of repetitions and dialogues, which highlights the nature of Chinese peasants and the social scenario of the era. The novel holds elements of black humor—a characteristic that Yu Hua typically applies in his other novels such as To Live. Yu Hua's style of using humor to highlight contemporary socio-political issues in China has been compared to the modern visual art movement of cynical realism.

The book received rave reviews from critics and an English translation by Andrew F. Jones was released in 2003. The title has also been translated as The Chronicle of Xu Sanguan's Blood Selling, Xu Sanguan's Records of Selling Blood and The Tale of Xu Sanguan Selling Blood. The translator stated that this novel is "a work of literary imagination and social critique."

== Plot ==
Xu Sanguan works in a silk factory, distributing silk-worm cocoons to the spinners. To make extra income, Xu Sanguan decides to sell blood at a hospital. He befriends Genlong and Ah Fang, who are blood-sellers themselves and with whom Xu travels to the hospital. The two tell Xu that every time after they sell their blood, they have a plate of fried pork livers and two shots of yellow rice wine at the Victory Restaurant, believing that the pork livers replenish blood while the rice wine maintains the blood quality.

Xu Sanguan marries Xu Yulan and gives birth to three boys soon after: Yile, Erle and Sanle. After nine years, questions about Yile's legitimacy arises, and it is revealed that Xu Yulan had slept with her ex-lover, He Xiaoyong. Xu Sanguan's relationship with Yile becomes tumultuous as a result. One day, the sons get into a fight and Yile critically injures Blacksmith Fang's son. At first, both Xu and He deny responsibility for Yile's actions and refuse to pay for Blacksmith Fang's son's hospital bill. But Xu sells his blood and pays his debt to Fang. Ashamed of being a cuckold, Xu sleeps with a former love interest of his, Lin Fenfang.

1958 rolls around, and the family is caught in the socio-political upheaval brought about by the Great Leap Forward. Famine sweeps across the country. With communal canteens set up by the Chinese Communist Party all closing, Xu's family is forced to look out for themselves. The silk factory where Xu Sanguan works also closes. After selling his blood once again, Xu Sanguan takes the whole family except Yile to eat noodles at the Victory Restaurant. Distraught, Yile approaches He Xiaoyong, his supposed biological father, hoping to find acceptance, but is also rejected. After wandering the streets, Yile returns to a worried Xu Sanguan who takes him to the Victory Restaurant for noodles. Xu Sanguan's relationship with Yile is mended as a result.

One day, He Xiaoyong gets hit by a truck and is critically injured. After consulting a fortune-teller, He Xiaoyong's wife is told that to recover her husband's soul from heaven, a son must call atop the chimney and beg for his soul to return. However, as He Xiaoyong only has two daughters, He's wife approaches Yile, He Xiaoyong's supposed biological son, for help. After some convincing, Yile agrees, and proceeds to call atop the chimney for He Xiaoyong's soul to return. Xu Sanguan retrieves Yile from the chimney and swears an oath claiming Yile as his son. It is later revealed that He Xiaoyong did not survive his injuries.

The Cultural Revolution arrives. Xu Yulan is accused of being a prostitute and is forced to suffer through struggle sessions. Day after day, Xu Yulan stands in the street on a stool with a placard labelled 'Xu Yulan, Prostitute'. Yile is sent to the countryside as part of the Communist Party's policy of re-education. Erle is also sent away after graduating school, leaving only Sanle with Xu Sanguan and Xu Yulan. Sanle begins working in a machine tools factory after completing school.

Xu Sanguan finds himself running low on money again and goes to sell blood. At the blood station, he coincidentally finds Genlong, whom he had not seen for ten years. Xu learns that Ah Fang is in poor health after his bladder had burst from drinking too much water. The two men head to Victory Restaurant for a meal afterwards, but Genlong falls ill and dies. The doctors say Genlong died from a cerebral hemorrhage, but Xu suspects Genlong sold too much blood. Back at the countryside where Yile and Erle's production brigades work, Yile becomes sick. Erle carries his brother to the ferry and they both return to town where Yile can receive treatment. It is revealed that Yile contracted hepatitis and must travel to Shanghai for proper treatment. Erle also falls ill from a flu and is sent to hospital. Xu Sanguan goes around the village borrowing money and gathers enough to send Yile and Xu Yulan to Shanghai. He plans to meet them in Shanghai and resorts to selling blood once again.

Xu Sanguan sets off for Shanghai, selling blood at multiple hospitals along his journey. He grows increasingly weak from the practice and is hospitalized for a period of time. Xu Sanguan manages to hitch a ride on a barge, and he befriends the two brothers operating the vessel, Laixi and Laishun. Xu travels with them for several days and the three sell blood along the way. Eventually, Xu parts ways with the brothers and reaches Shanghai, where he finds Yile is alive and recovering well.

Some years later, Yile, Erle and Sanle have all gotten stable jobs, gotten married, had children and moved into their own houses. One day, Xu Sanguan passes Victory Restaurant and feels the urge to sell blood. But this time, he is rejected as he is deemed too old. Xu becomes worried that he can no longer sell blood to support his family when in need, but Xu Yulan, Yile, Erle, and Sanle remind him that he does not need to sell blood anymore for the tough times have passed. The novel ends with Xu Yulan and Xu Sanguan having a meal of fried pork livers and yellow rice wine at the Victory Restaurant.

== Major themes ==
Chronicle of a Blood Merchant describes the suffering of the lower class which took place during the most turbulent time in Chinese history, and creates a sorrowful atmosphere with a touch of gentleness. Blood is the main element, which builds up throughout the majority of the story. The protagonist sells his blood twelve times in the story for many reasons, including cultural taboo, food, and sacrifices. Xu Sanguan sells his blood to overcome crises he faces in his life, to a point where he believes that selling blood could overcome any crisis. However, at the end of the story Xu Sanguan could not sell his blood anymore because he is too old and the quality of his blood is not accessible to anyone.

== Characters ==
- Xu Sanguan (许三观): The protagonist, a cart-pusher in a silk factory in a small rural town. He had to sell his blood because his meager salary is not enough to sustain his family.
- Xu Yulan (许玉兰): Xu Sanguan‘s wife, a pretty young woman "Fried Dough Queen", She became a housewife after having three sons.
- Yile (一乐): The eldest son of Xu Sanguan.
- Erle (二乐): The second son of Xu Sanguan.
- Sanle (三乐): The youngest son of Xu Sanguan.
- He Xiaoyong (何小勇): Xu Yulan's ex-lover, who is supposedly Yile’s biological father.
- Lin Fenfang (林芬芳): Xu Sanguan had an affair with Lin Fenfang when he found out that Yile was not his own son.
- Blood Chief Li (李血头): The bald man who's in charge of buying blood for the hospital. He's the one that decides who gets to sell blood and who doesn't.
- Ah Fang and Genlong (阿方 根龙): Xu Sanguan accompanies them to the hospital for his first blood sale.

== Critical response ==
According to Jeffrey Wasserstrom, Chronicle of a Blood Merchant was "hailed by many as one of the best books published in China in the 1990s." Richard King addressed Gang Yue's comparison to Lu Xun by stating that "Yu Hua's small-town everyman becomes a figure of a dignity to which Ah Q could never aspire". King also praised the novel's construction. The book was praised in The Seattle Times as a "rare achievement in literature.... [Xu Sanguan is] a character that reflects not just a generation but the soul of a people." Michael Laris of The Washington Post argued, "The epic—and at times crude—stories of struggle and survival in [...] Chronicle of a Blood Merchant offer unforgettable images of cruelty and kindness, [and] Yu Hua's characters are torn between their animal instincts and their humanity. What Yu Hua brings to these narratives is a steely willingness to take things too far."

Ha Jin, author of Waiting, described Yu Hua as a "major contemporary novelist" and stated that the latter "writes with a cold eye but a warm heart. His novels are ingeniously structured and exude a mythical aura. Though unmistakably Chinese, they are universally resonant." Dai Sijie, author of Balzac and the Little Chinese Seamstress (2000), called it a "wrenching and blackly humorous tale. Long after I closed the book, the character Xu Sanguan has remained stubbornly impressed upon my heart."

Wang Ping, author of Foreign Devil (1996) and Aching for Beauty (2000), wrote, "Chronicle of a Blood Merchant takes us straight to the heartland of China—the towns, streets, courtyards, kitchens, and bedrooms where ordinary Chinese live. They may not be great warriors or politicians, but their courageous efforts in living a life with hope and dignity make them true heroes. This book is a gem." Nola Theiss, author of Kliatt, argued, "The story is filled with strange attitudes and behaviors, which give insight to this peculiar time and place. Yu Hua is considered one of the most important young writers in China today and his writing carries a truth that is typical of fables and parables."

== Adaptions ==
A Korean-language film adaptation, directed by Ha Jung-woo, premiered in South Korea on January 15, 2015. Instead of being set in rural China, the film was localized and the setting shifted to the aftermath of the Korean War. Leaving out the political movements, the film emphasizes more on the storyline of protagonists' daily life.

In 2013, a stage play Chronicle of a Blood Merchant reworked by Tang Wai-Kit was premiered by the We Draman Group in Hong Kong.
