= To Live (1994 film) =

Film by Zhang Yimou

- US theatrical release poster
- Traditional Chinese: 活著
- Simplified Chinese: 活着
- Literal meaning: alive / to be alive
- Hanyu Pinyin: Huózhe
- Directed by: Zhang Yimou
- Screenplay by: Lu Wei
- Based on: To Live by Yu Hua
- Produced by: Chiu Fu-sheng; Funhong Kow; Christophe Tseng
- Starring: Ge You; Gong Li; Niu Ben; Guo Tao; Jiang Wu
- Cinematography: Lü Yue
- Edited by: Du Yuan
- Music by: Zhao Jiping
- Distributed by: The Samuel Goldwyn Company
- Release date: May 18, 1994 (Cannes)
- Running time: 132 minutes
- Countries: China; Taiwan
- Language: Mandarin
- Box office: $2.3 million (US/Canada)

To Live (Chinese: 活着; pinyin: Huózhe), also known as Lifetimes, is a 1994 Chinese drama film directed by Zhang Yimou and adapted from Yu Hua's 1993 novel of the same name. The film spans the 1940s–1970s, tracing the Xu family's survival through the Chinese Civil War, Great Leap Forward, and Cultural Revolution. It won numerous prestigious international awards, and despite domestic censorship, is widely respected for its portrayal of ordinary resilience under political duress.

The film looks back on four generations of the Xu family: Xu Fugui, played by Ge You; his father, a wealthy landowner; his wife, Jiazhen, played by Gong Li; their daughter, Fengxia, and son, Youqing; and finally their grandson, Little Bun. The action goes from the Chinese Civil War in the late 1940s to the Cultural Revolution of the 1960s and 1970s. The film, like many examples of fiction and film in the 1970s and 1980s, demonstrates the difficulties of the common Chinese, but ends when conditions are seemingly improving in the 1980s.

To Live was screened at the 1994 New York Film Festival before eventually receiving a limited release in the United States on November 18, 1994. The film has been used in the United States as a support to teach Chinese history in colleges. Films like To Live present opportunities for diverse audiences to effectively visualize prominent historical events, and the impact that they had on different demographics of people. To Live offers a straightforward, almost plain, approach to portraying personal perspective within a complicated period of Chinese history. It is this simplicity that makes it an invaluable educational asset in teaching the impacts of this period and the issues of the Great Leap Forward in particular.

Having achieved international success with his previous films (Ju Dou and Raise the Red Lantern), director Zhang Yimou's To Live came with high expectations, and lived up to it, receiving critical acclaim. It is the first Chinese film that had its foreign distribution rights pre-sold. Furthermore, To Live brought home the Grand Prix, Prize of the Ecumenical Jury, and Best Actor Award (Ge You) from the 1994 Cannes Film Festival, the highest major international awards Zhang Yimou has ever won. The Film also won the BAFTA Award for Best Film Not in the English Language at the 48th British Academy Film Awards in 1995.

The film was denied a theatrical release in mainland China by the Chinese State Administration of Radio, Film, and Television due to its critical portrayal of policies and political campaigns. Despite the ban, the film was aired in Chinese theaters since as soon as 1995. It is claimed both Zhang Yimou and Gong Li were each banned from filmmaking for two years as a consequence of the film's submission to Cannes without prior official approval, and the ban on the film itself was not lifted until late 2008.

== Plot ==
In the 1940s, Xu Fugui, a rich man's son and compulsive gambler, loses his ancestral home to a man named Long'er. His wife Jiazhen leaves him, taking their daughter Fengxia and unborn son Youqing. His father dies after signing over the family house to Long'er. Destitute, Fugui vows to never gamble again as Jiazhen returns. When Fugui asks for a loan, Long'er gives Fugui a set of shadow puppets. To make a living, Fugui starts a shadow puppet troupe with a partner named Chunsheng. The Chinese Civil War is occurring at the time, and Fugui and Chunsheng are conscripted into the Kuomintang's Republic of China armed forces during a performance. Midway through the war, the two are captured by the communist People's Liberation Army and earn a certificate of commendation for performing their shadow puppet operas for the revolutionaries. After the Communist victory, Fugui returns home and learns that Fengxia has become mute and partially deaf due to illness.

Fugui learns that Long'er burned all his property just to deny the new regime from seizing it. He is eventually put on trial for counter-revolutionary sabotage and sentenced to execution. Realizing that Long'er's fate would have been his if not for his "misfortune" earlier, Fugui is filled with fear. He runs home to tell Jiazhen what has happened, and they quickly retrieve the certificate stating that Fugui served in the communist People's Liberation Army. Jiazhen assures him they are no longer gentries and will not be killed.

A decade later, Mao initiates the Great Leap Forward. The local village chief enlists everyone to donate all scrap iron to the national drive to produce steel and make weaponry for invading Taiwan. As an entertainer, Fugui performs for the entire town nightly. Fengxia delivers water to the workers, and the children aid in the steel-making process.

The children are exhausted from the hard labor they are doing in the town and try to sleep whenever they can. They eventually get a break during the festivities for meeting the scrap metal quota while the entire village eats dumplings in celebration. However, Youqing is called to the school to prepare for the District Chief's inspection. Though Jiazhen wants to let him sleep, Fugui insists that he go and carries his son to school. Later that night, the car carrying the District Chief gets into a freak accident and kills Youqing. The District Chief visits the family at the grave, only to be revealed as Chunsheng. His attempts to apologize and compensate the family are rejected, particularly by Jiazhen, who tells him he owes her family a life.

Another decade later, the Cultural Revolution is starting. The village chief advises Fugui to burn his shadow puppets, which have been deemed as counter-revolutionary. Fengxia is now grown up and her family arranges for her to meet Wan Erxi, a local leader of the Red Guards. Erxi, a man crippled by a workplace accident, fixes her parents' roof and paints depictions of Mao Zedong on their walls with his workmates. He proves to be a kind, gentle man; he and Fengxia fall in love and marry, and she soon becomes pregnant. Chunsheng, still in the government, visits immediately after the wedding to ask for Jiazhen's forgiveness, but she refuses to acknowledge him.

Later, Chunsheng is branded a reactionary and a capitalist. He comes to tell them his wife has committed suicide and that he intends to as well. To atone for Youqing's death, he has come to give them all his money. Fugui refuses to take it. As Chunsheng leaves, Jiazhen commands him to live, reminding him that he still owes them a life.

Months later, during Fengxia's childbirth, her parents and husband accompany her to the county hospital. All doctors have been sent to do hard labor for being over-educated, and the students are left as the only ones in charge after they have "overthrown" the doctors. Wan Erxi manages to find a doctor to oversee the birth, removing him from confinement, but he is very weak from starvation. Fugui purchases seven steamed buns (mantou) for him, and the family decides to name the son Mantou, after the buns. Fengxia begins to hemorrhage during the birth, and the nurses panic, admitting that they do not know what to do. The family and nurses seek the advice of the doctor, but find that he has overeaten (the buns expanded in his stomach) and is semiconscious. The family is helpless, and Fengxia dies.

The film ends six years later, with the family now consisting of Fugui, Jiazhen, their son-in-law Erxi, and grandson Mantou. The family visits the graves of Youqing and Fengxia, where Jiazhen leaves dumplings for her son and family photos for her daughter. Erxi buys a box full of young chicks for his son, which they decide to keep in the chest formerly used for the shadow puppets. When Mantou inquires how long it will take for the chicks to grow up, Fugui's response is a more tempered version of something he said earlier in the film. He expresses optimism for his grandson's future, and the film ends with his statement, "life will get better and better" as the family sits down to eat.

== Cast ==
- Ge You as Xu Fugui (traditional Chinese: 徐福貴; simplified Chinese: 徐福贵; pinyin: Xú Fúguì; lit. 'Lucky & Rich'):
  - Fugui came from a rich family, but he is addicted to gambling, so his pregnant wife walks away from him with their daughter. After he gambles away all his possessions, his father passes away due to anger. After a year, his wife comes back and they start their life over again. Fugui and Chunsheng together maintain a shadow puppet business for their livelihood, but they are forcibly conscripted by the Kuomintang army, and later the Communist Party. When at last, Fugui gets home after the war, everything has changed.
- Gong Li as Jiazhen (Chinese: 家珍; pinyin: Jiāzhēn; lit. 'Family Treasure'), Fugui's wife:
  - Jiazhen is a hard-working, kind, and virtuous woman. She is a strong spiritual pillar for Fugui. When her husband gambles his possessions away, Jiazhen angrily leaves him and takes their daughter away. But when Fugui had lost everything, and she knows that Fugui had completely quit gambling, she returns to his side to share in weal and woe. She is not after a great fortune, just a peaceful life with her family.
- Liu Tianchi as adult Xu Fengxia (traditional Chinese: 徐鳳霞; simplified Chinese: 徐凤霞; pinyin: Xú Fèngxiá; lit. 'Phoenix & Rosy Clouds'), daughter of Fugui and Jiazhen
  - Xiao Cong as teenage Xu Fengxia;
  - Zhang Lu as child Xu Fengxia;
  - When Fengxia was a child, she suffered from a serious fever that could not be treated in time, leaving her mute and slightly deaf. Years later, she married Wan Erxi and became pregnant. However, complications arose during her labour, and she died due to a lack of professional medical care.
- Fei Deng as Xu Youqing (traditional Chinese: 徐有慶; simplified Chinese: 徐有庆; pinyin: Xú Yǒuqìng; lit. 'Full of Celebration'), Fugui and Jiazhen's son:
  - Youqing is accidentally hit and killed by Chunsheng due to drowsy driving during the Great Leap Forward.
- Jiang Wu as Wan Erxi (traditional Chinese: 萬二喜; simplified Chinese: 万二喜; pinyin: Wàn Èrxǐ; lit. 'Double Happiness'), Fengxia's husband:
  - Wan Erxi is introduced midway through the film. He is portrayed as a kind and hardworking local factory worker who suffers a disabling leg injury caused by a workplace accident. He later marries Fengxia and becomes part of her family. Despite his disability, he continues to support Fengxia and her relatives. He also uses his position as a former Red Guard official to help bring a doctor into the hospital in an attempt to assist Fengxia during her childbirth complications.
- Niu Ben as the Town Chief, a paternalistic local Communist official who shepherds the village through successive political campaigns and remains a friend of the Xu family across decades.
- Ni Dahong as Long'er (traditional Chinese: 龍二; simplified Chinese: 龙二; pinyin: Lóng'èr; lit. 'Dragon the Second'):
  - Long'er at first is the head of a shadow puppet troupe and won all of Fu Gui's property by gambling. After liberation, he is classified as a landlord and his property is ordered to be confiscated. But he refuses the confiscation, and sets the property on fire. As a result, he is convicted of the crime of "counterrevolutionary sabotage" and sentenced to death by shooting.
- Guo Tao as Chunsheng (Chinese: 春生; pinyin: Chūnshēng; lit. 'Spring-born'):
  - Fugui's good friend, they serve together as forced conscripts. Chunsheng then joins the People's Liberation Army, and becomes the district governor. Due to this position, he is criticized as a capitalist roader and endures struggle sessions during the Cultural Revolution.

== Production ==
=== Development ===
Zhang Yimou originally intended to adapt Mistake at River's Edge, a thriller written by Yu Hua. Yu gave Zhang a set of all of the works that had been published at that point so Zhang could understand his works. Zhang said when he began reading To Live, one of the works, he was unable to stop reading it. Zhang met with Yu to discuss the script for Mistake at River's Edge, but they kept bringing up To Live. Thus, the two decided to adapt To Live instead.

=== Casting ===
Ge You, known for his comedic roles, was chosen by Zhang Yimou to play the title character, Fugui. Known for poker-faced comedy, he was not accustomed to expressing emotional states this character requires. Thus, he was not very confident in himself, even protesting going to the Cannes Film Festival where he would eventually garner a best actor award. Zhang had taken particular notice of Ge You's nuanced supporting performance in Chen Kaige's Farewell My Concubine (1993), and felt his deadpan timing could provide a counterweight to the gravity of the material.

For Gong Li, To Live was her fifth collaboration with Zhang as director, following Red Sorghum (1987), Ju Dou (1990), Raise the Red Lantern (1991), and The Story of Qiu Ju (1992); the partnership had defined the international image of contemporary Chinese cinema by the early 1990s.

=== Director ===
Zhang spent his youth during the Cultural Revolution, an experience that influenced his later perspective on Chinese culture and society.

As a student who studied screen studies in university in the country's capital city, he and his peers were heavily exposed to various movies from across the world and across time. His classmate, who is now the President of the Beijing Film Academy, stated that during their four years in university, they went through over 500 films, spanning from Hollywood films from the 1930s to Italian Neo-Realism. Zhang stated in a previous interview that, even after many years, he still remembered the culture shock he experienced when first exposed to the wide variety of films.

The combination of these two major aspects of his background contributed to his filmmaking perspective. He developed an understanding of both Chinese national cinema as well as international film practices, which influenced his work throughout his career.

Zhang described To Live as the film he felt the strongest connection to because of the Cultural Revolution background in the film. The political background of Zhang's family was the label “double-counterrevolutionary”, which was the worst kind of counterrevolutionary. Different from other fifth-generation filmmakers such as Chen Kaige and Tian Zhuangzhuang, Zhang was in a desperate state and cannot trace back things that were lost during the Cultural Revolution. Zhang said “For me, that was an era without hope – I lived in a world of desperation”.

Zhang, in an interview, described how he used different elements that diverged from the original novel. The use of the shadow play and puppet theatre was to emphasize a different visual look. The ending of the film To Live is different from the novel's because Zhang wanted to pass the censorship in China and gain approval from the audience in mainland China, even though the film has not been publicly screened in China yet. On the other hand, Zhang's family had suffered enormously during the Cultural Revolution, but, as Zhang stated, they still survived. Thus, he felt that the book's ending where everyone in Fu Gui's family had died was not as reasonable. Furthermore, Zhang Yimou chose Ge You, who is famous for his comedic roles to play the protagonist, Fu Gui. Ge You actually inspired Zhang to add more humorous elements in the film, therefore it is more reasonable not to kill every character at the end.

=== Design ===
The production employed traditional artisans, such as Shaanxi master puppeteers Wang Tianwen and Pan Jingle, to orchestrate the shadow puppet sequences featured in the film.

=== Cinematography and visual style ===
The cinematography was overseen by Lü Yue, replacing Zhang's earlier collaborator Gu Changwei, who had shot Red Sorghum, Ju Dou, and Raise the Red Lantern. The film's visual approach is notably restrained compared with Zhang's earlier work, exchanging saturated colour fields and stylised tableaux for a quieter palette suited to a story of ordinary domestic life unfolding across decades. Critics have observed that Zhang and Lü Yue rely on emblematic compositions drawn from everyday detail: the red thumbprints sealing Fugui's gambling debts at the start of the film; a bayonet punching through the screen of a shadow-puppet performance to mark the arrival of the Civil War; the silhouettes of Fugui and Chunsheng tumbling down a snowy hillside as Communist forces overtake them.

As the narrative moves into the Mao era, the iconography of the Communist Party — slogans, big-character posters, propaganda murals, and especially portraits of Mao — saturates the family's domestic spaces, often appearing as the dominant visual element within a frame. Costume design by Dong Huamiao and art direction by Cao Jiuping shift in tandem, with garments and interiors growing progressively plainer and more uniform as the film advances from the 1940s through the 1970s. The film also avoids relying on prosthetics or visual effects to depict the characters' aging across thirty years; instead, Ge You and Gong Li convey the passage of time primarily through changes in posture, gait, and bearing, supplemented by alterations in costume and hairstyle.

=== Music ===
The score was composed by Zhao Jiping, who was already established internationally for his work with Fifth Generation directors, including Zhang Yimou's Raise the Red Lantern (1991) and Chen Kaige's Farewell My Concubine (1993). For To Live, Zhao combined a Western-style symphony orchestra with traditional Chinese instruments such as the banhu, xun, sheng, and erhu, using the latter to underscore moments of grief and quiet endurance. A simple, recurring melodic motif — sometimes described by critics as functioning like an aural ellipsis — recurs at the family's successive turning points, conferring a sense of continuity across the film's three decades of narrative time. Cues from the score, including "Fu Gui and Jia Zhen", were later collected on the Marco Polo anthology Electric Shadows: Film Music by Zhao Jiping, performed by the China Symphony Orchestra and released in 2000.

=== Post-production ===
Because To Live was a foreign-funded co-production with Taiwanese backing, Zhang's team sent the negative to Japan for laboratory work and post-production. According to a contemporary Variety report, this took place shortly before Chinese authorities issued a regulation requiring that the negatives of foreign-funded films receive domestic approval before being processed abroad — a sequence of events that contributed to the political fallout following the film's Cannes premiere.

=== Differences from the novel ===
- Moved the setting from rural southern China to a small city in northern China.
- Added elements of shadow puppetry.
  - A symbol of wealth. Shows that it is at the mercy of others and can do nothing about its own future.
- Second narrator and the ox not present in the film.
- Fugui has a sense of political idealism that he loses by the end of the film.
- The novel is a retrospective, but Zhang adapts the film without the remembrance tone.
- Zhang introduced the elimination of Yu Hua's first person narration
- Only Fugui survives in the novel, but Fugui, Jiazhen, Erxi, and Mantou all survive in the film.
- In the novel, the grandson is named Kugen (苦根, 'Bitter Root'), embedding the family's suffering into his identity. In the film, he's called Mantou (馒头, 'Steamed Bun') — humbler and softer, stripping the fatalism from his name.
- The cause of Youqing's death changes between the two versions: in the novel, he dies after being forced to give too much blood for the wife of the local magistrate (his father's old friend Chunsheng), whereas in the film he is killed when Chunsheng's car accidentally collides with a wall behind which the boy has fallen asleep.
- The novel’s ending portrays human helplessness in the face of tragedy, emphasizing how characters endure prolonged suffering and passively accept their pain to survive. Conversely, the film offers a more optimistic, open conclusion. It suggests that societal trauma caused by government policies will ultimately be healed by future progress and human development.

=== Adaptation ===
In the film of To Live, Zhang Yimou did not choose to directly express the theme of the novel, but to reduce the number of deaths, change the way of death, and cut into the doomed sense of fate to eliminate the audience's immediate depression brought by the story itself. In the film, these deliberately set dramatic turns highlight the theme that those infinitely small people, as living “others”, can only rely on living instinct to bear suffering in history, times and social torrents. The theme of the novel – the ability to bear suffering and the optimistic attitude to the world – is hidden in these little people who are helpless to their own fate, but still live strongly.

An extremely faithful adaptation of the novel would have been far too dark and depressing for an audience to endure. The original novel's characters continually experience misery and loss, and suffer without a break. It implies a bleaker philosophy on the trials the characters face: that life's suffering is pointless and humans continue living because they feel obligated to continue existing. The film is optimistic and presents an uplifting interpretation by comparison, portraying an appreciation for the simpler moments of life and that the suffering of life is eventually rewarded. Though Yu Hua continues to prefer his novel, the collaboration between Yu Hua and the film adaptation's screenwriters ensured the core focus of the story–the undying tenacity of the human spirit in the face of suffering–remains clear. Therefore, Zhang decided to alter certain aspects of the story, removing some of the more tragic elements, in order to make it more accessible. Scholars have analyzed To Live as a creative adaptation of Yu Hua's novel, focusing on the changes made by Zhang Yimou in transforming literary text into movies.

In a later interview reproduced in Michael Berry's Speaking in Images, Zhang Yimou said the change to the ending was made primarily so that the film could pass Chinese censorship and reach a domestic audience, but he also acknowledged that the wholesale extinction of the family in the novel did not match his own family's experience of having survived the Cultural Revolution.

Zhang Yimou significantly altered key elements of Yu Hua's novel—shifting the setting from rural southern China to northern small-town, adding shadow-puppetry, and preserving character survival to align with more hopeful cinematic storytelling.

== Release ==
=== Cannes premiere ===
To Live premiered in competition at the 1994 Cannes Film Festival on 18 May 1994. Although the film took home three major prizes — the Grand Prix (tied with Nikita Mikhalkov's Burnt by the Sun), the Prize of the Ecumenical Jury, and Best Actor for Ge You — Zhang Yimou himself did not attend the festival. According to Variety, his absence was widely interpreted as a deferential gesture toward Beijing authorities, who had not officially cleared the film for international submission. Clint Eastwood, who served as the president of the Jury that year, told The New York Times years later that To Live was his favorite film of the competition, but the other jurors preferred Pulp Fiction, which won the Golden Palm.

=== Limited release in North America ===
The film opened on September 16, 1994 in Canada and November 18, 1994 in the United States, expanding to 4 theaters, including Angelika Film Center and Lincoln Plaza in New York City. The film grossed $32,900 during its opening weekend of November 19 to November 20. It went on to gross $2.3 million in the United States and Canada. Worldwide gross has been reported at approximately US$2.33 million.

=== Chinese censorship ===
This film was banned in China due to a combination of factors. First, it has a critical portrayal of various policies and campaigns of the Communist Government, such as how the protagonists’ tragedies were caused as a result of the Great Leap Forward and the Cultural Revolution. Second, Zhang and his sponsors entered the film at the Cannes Film Festival without the usual government's permission, ruffling the feathers of the party. Lastly, this film suffered from the bad timing of its release, following Farewell My Concubine and The Blue Kite, films which cover almost the same subject matter and historical period. Both of these films had alerted the Chinese government, due to their similar critical portrayals of Chinese policies, and made them very cautious and aware of the need to ban any future films that tried to touch on the same topics.

The personal repercussions for the filmmakers extended well beyond the film itself. As reported by Roger Ebert in his review, Zhang Yimou and Gong Li were each prohibited from any further co-productions for two years, and were forbidden from publicly discussing the film during that period. Zhang was reported to have submitted a public letter of self-criticism to Chinese authorities as part of the resolution.

Despite being officially banned, the film was widely available on video in China upon its release and was even shown in some theaters. The official ban was reported to have been quietly lifted in late 2008, although the film has remained outside the channels of mainstream domestic theatrical distribution.

=== Home media ===
To Live was issued on VHS in North America by The Samuel Goldwyn Company in the mid-1990s and on DVD by MGM under the World Films label in 2003 (Region 1). The MGM disc went out of print, and as of 2026 the film has not received a North American Blu-ray release. Region-coded DVDs have also been issued in the UK, Australia (by AV Channel), and several territories in continental Europe and East Asia.

== Reception ==
=== Critical response ===
To Live received critical acclaim and various critics selected the film in their year end lists. To Live has an approval rating of 87% on review aggregator website Rotten Tomatoes, based on 23 reviews, and an average rating of 8.3/10. The website's critical consensus states: "To Live (Huo zhe) offers a gut-wrenching overview of Chinese political upheaval through the lens of one family's unforgettable experiences".

Reviewing the film for the Chicago Sun-Times, Roger Ebert gave it three and a half stars out of four and praised it as a strong and energetic work covering four decades of Chinese history through the lives of ordinary people. He highlighted Jiazhen's longing for a quiet life as the film's emotional core, and observed that the political fallout faced by Zhang and Gong Li had only sharpened the urgency of the work. Caryn James of The New York Times, reviewing the U.S. theatrical opening, described the film as a poignant family epic and singled out Ge You's performance for sustaining the picture across its long timeframe.

Jonathan Rosenbaum, writing in the Chicago Reader, praised the film for combining vast historical scope with a sense of intimacy, and for foregrounding the role of chance and fate in the lives of its characters. Kevin Thomas of the Los Angeles Times ranked the film fourth on his year-end list, and James Berardinelli of ReelViews awarded the film high marks, calling Zhang's work as honest as nearly any other film of 1994 and grouping it with the director's prior breakthroughs Ju Dou and Raise the Red Lantern.

In Variety, critic Derek Elley gave the film a more measured assessment, praising its craftsmanship and Ge You's "quirky, ironic edge" but arguing that Lü Yue's restrained cinematography parades through history rather than fully engaging the viewer's emotions for sustained passages. Lisa Schwarzbaum of Entertainment Weekly commended Zhang's facility for strong visual tableaux and the calibre of the central performances. Time Out described the film as less an indictment of the Mao era than a portrait of the resilience that allowed people to live through it.

There is, among film critics, almost a consensus that To Live is not merely a lament of difficult times, nor a critique of the evils of the totalitarian system, but more “an homage to the characters’ resilience and heroism in their odyssey of survival.” Some scholars further argue that the era's hostile and chaotic environment is not the story itself, but simply serves as a stage for the story.

=== Accolades ===
==== Year-end lists ====
- 4th – Kevin Thomas, Los Angeles Times.
- 5th – Janet Maslin, The New York Times.
- 5th – James Berardinelli, ReelViews
- 9th – Michael MacCambridge, Austin American-Statesman.
- Honourable mention – Mike Clark, USA Today.
- Honourable mention – Betsy Pickle, Knoxville News-Sentinel.

==== Awards and nominations ====
Awards	Year	Category	Result	Notes
Cannes Film Festival	1994	Grand Prix	Won	Tied with Burnt by the Sun
Cannes Film Festival	1994	Prize of the Ecumenical Jury	Won	Tied with Burnt by the Sun
Cannes Film Festival	1994	Best Actor (Ge You)	Won	
Cannes Film Festival	1994	Palme d'Or	Nominated	
Golden Globe Award	1994	Best Foreign Language Film	Nominated	
National Board of Review	1994	Best Foreign Language Film	Top 5	with four other films
National Society of Film Critics Award	1995	Best Foreign Language Film	Runner-up	
BAFTA Award	1995	Best Film Not in the English Language	Won	
Dallas-Fort Worth Film Critics Association Award	1995	Best Foreign Film	Runner-up	

==== Other accolades ====
- Time Out 100 Best Chinese Mainland Films – #8
- Included in The New York Times list of The Best 1000 Movies Ever Made in 2004
- included in CNN's list of 18 Best Asian Movie of All Time in 2008
- The film ranked 41st in BBC's 2018 list of The 100 greatest foreign language films voted by 109 film critics from 43 countries around the world.

== Themes ==
=== Survival and endurance ===
The Mandarin word huózhe (活着) translates simply as "alive" or "to be alive", and critics have identified survival as the film's most insistent theme. Rather than positing resistance, transcendence, or political awakening as the answer to historical violence, To Live privileges what scholar Rey Chow has described as the act of merely enduring: a sustained, ungrand persistence of ordinary life through whatever conditions history imposes on it. The Xu family's reactions to political shifts — Fugui's enthusiasm in painting Mao on his own wall, his careful preservation of the People's Liberation Army certificate, his urging of his son to obey the District Chief — are presented less as ideological commitments than as pragmatic survival strategies that often prove tragically futile.

=== Fate, Daoism and the cyclical nature of life ===
Several critics have read the film through the lens of Daoist thought, in particular the Daoist conception of fate as a cycle of fortune and misfortune that operates beyond individual control. In an essay in Film Criticism, Liang Shi argues that To Live embodies a Daoist cosmic discourse: the title's apparent simplicity masks a complex resignation to the arbitrary play of fate, and the plot's central pattern — Fugui's continual movement between fortune and misfortune — recurs in a manner consistent with classical Daoist accounts of cosmic alternation. The narrative is structured so that each rise in the family's circumstances is matched by a corresponding fall, often arriving precisely as Fugui has resolved to lead a more virtuous life.

=== Family ===
Scholars have noted that the film transforms the trauma of a family, such as Fugui’s, into a microcosm of the national broader history and politics. Furthermore, throughout the political upheavals depicted in the film, the family unit is presented as the primary refuge from external violence and the principal source of meaning in the characters' lives. Studies have noted that the film foregrounds traditional Chinese family values such as filial piety, spousal loyalty, and intergenerational care, and that its closing tableau — Fugui, Jiazhen, Erxi and Mantou eating together at home — is the most emphatic affirmation of those values in the picture. Furthermore, socholars have noted that the film transforms the trauma of a family, such as Fugui’s, into a microcosm of the national broader history and politics.

=== Political imagery and the figure of Mao ===
The image of Mao saturates the film's later scenes — appearing on walls, posters, badges, propaganda murals painted by Erxi and his comrades on the Xu family home, and even on the bedclothes used at Fengxia and Erxi's wedding. One scholarly reading argues that Mao functions almost as an additional, voiceless character within the film, an omnipresent force whose decrees translate directly into the family's tragedies. Zhang underplays explicit denunciation in favour of a quieter visual irony: the family's attempts to demonstrate political loyalty are shown to be just as futile, and just as fatal, as outright resistance would have been.

=== Food ===
- Dumplings: Youqing's lunch box with dumplings inside is never opened. These dumplings reappear as an offering on Youqing's tomb repeatedly. Rather than being eaten and absorbed, the dumplings are now lumps of dough and meat standing as reminders of a life that has been irreparably wasted.
- Mantou (steamed wheat bun): When Fengxia is giving birth, Doctor Wang, the only qualified doctor, passes out due to eating too many buns after a long time of hunger. Thus, he is unable to save Fengxia's life. The mantou, meant to ease his hunger, re-hydrates and expands within his stomach, shrunken with starvation. “Filling stomach” ironically leads to the death of Fengxia. The buns do not save a life – they are an indirect killer of Fengxia.
- Noodles: Youqing uses his meal as revenge for his sister. Although wasted in a literal sense, they are not wasted in Youqing's mind. Food is not merely for “filling a stomach” or “to live.” Similarly, “to live” does not depend solely on food.

=== Shadow puppetry ===
Zhang Yimou deliberately added elements of shadow puppetry to the film, as they were not present in the original novel by Yu Hua. He intended to strengthen the film's narrative and metaphors, allowing the shadow puppet performances to help drive the narrative throughout the story. This choice also aligns with Zhang Yimou's broader directorial style. He frequently incorporates traditional Chinese operatic cultural elements, including shadow play, to further the Chinese voice behind his films, aiming to amplify a distinctly Chinese aesthetic. The shadow play depicted in To Live is characteristic of the melancholic northwestern style of the Shaanxi and Gansu areas, contributing to the tragic mood forged by Yimou.

The shadow puppetry functions as a profound symbol in the film, initially representing a "symbol of wealth" for Fugui, and later metaphorically representing his life as a young man of prestige and power. Its use suggests that individuals are "at the mercy of others and can do nothing about their own future," directly paralleling the characters' helplessness against larger historical and societal forces. The film uses shadow play to present the theme that "life is like a play, and a play mirrors life".

Shadow puppet theatre (piying xi) is one of China's four major types of puppetry, alongside hand, rod, and string puppet traditions[. Historically, these puppet theatres entertained commoners and nobility, and also served as a means of historical narrative and moral teaching for the uneducated classes. The film highlights the rarity of seeing Chinese shadow puppetry outside of China, or even in feature films.

=== Recurring lines ===
In two places of the film, there is a similar line. The version that appears earlier in the film is: “The little chickens will grow to be ducks, the ducks will become geese, and the geese will become sheep, and the sheep will become oxen, and tomorrow will be better because of communism.” The version that appears later in the film is: “The little chickens will grow to be ducks, the ducks will become geese, and the geese will become sheep, and the sheep will become oxen, and tomorrow will be better.” Both of these interpretations derive from Yu Hua's original quote: “When these chickens grow up they'll become geese, and when the geese grow up they'll become lambs. When the lambs grow up they'll turn into oxen. And us, we'll get richer and richer!”. Despite the slight variations, this line consistently acts as a picture of the Chinese people's perseverance in the face of historical hardships, giving the feeling of hope for the audience.

The animal-transformation parable has also been linked by scholars to the Hans Christian Andersen folk tale "What the Old Man Does Is Always Right", in which a peasant successively trades a horse downward through a series of animals; one analysis suggests that Zhang's adoption of the motif invites viewers to question, rather than accept, the optimistic political slogans on which Fugui has come to rely. The dumplings that appear at multiple turning points have been read in the same allegorical register, since their shape echoes that of traditional Chinese gold ingots (yuanbao) and so silently links Mao-era promises of plenty to older, pre-revolutionary symbols of prosperity.

== Legacy ==
To Live is widely regarded as one of the major works of the Fifth Generation of Chinese filmmakers — the first cohort of directors trained at the Beijing Film Academy after the Cultural Revolution — and is frequently grouped with Chen Kaige's Farewell My Concubine (1993) and Tian Zhuangzhuang's The Blue Kite (1993) as part of an early-1990s wave of historical epics that examined the human cost of mid-twentieth-century Chinese politics.

The film also marked a turning point in Zhang Yimou's career. It was the last of the early dramas in which Gong Li played the female lead under his direction; their professional and personal partnership ended after their next film, Shanghai Triad (1995), and Zhang's subsequent work moved away from family melodrama toward rural-realist features such as Not One Less (1999) and, later, the wuxia spectacles Hero (2002) and House of Flying Daggers (2004).

In academic and educational contexts, To Live has become one of the most widely taught Chinese-language films in English-speaking universities. It is regularly used as a primary text in courses on twentieth-century Chinese history, East Asian studies, and film studies, where it is valued for compressing decades of political history into the perceptible scale of a single family's life. Yu Hua's source novel — also widely read in Chinese-language curricula and translated into more than a dozen languages — has been adapted in several other media, including a stage play and a 33-episode Chinese television series, Fugui (富贵), broadcast in 2005.

The film’s utilization of traditional Shaanxi artisans contributed significantly to the preservation of regional folk art. Prior to the release of To Live, the Huaxian shadow-puppet tradition had experienced a prolonged period of decline. The film, alongside Hou Hsiao-hsien’s The Puppetmaster (1993), brought Huaxian puppetry into the international spotlight and initiated its cultural revival. Following the film’s success, local farmers supplemented their incomes by producing and selling decorative puppets, which increasingly became commodities for tourists and private collectors. Although this commercialization transformed the puppets from performance tools into marketable cultural objects, it helped the tradition survive and contributed to its eventual recovery through renewed performances by the end of the twentieth century.

== See also ==
- Censorship in the People's Republic of China
- List of Chinese films
- List of films banned in China
- List of films featuring the deaf and hard of hearing
- Farewell My Concubine, a 1993 Chinese-Hong Kong film covering similar political movements
- The Blue Kite, a 1993 Chinese-Hong Kong film covering similar political movements
