= To Live (novel) =

1993 novel by Yu Hua

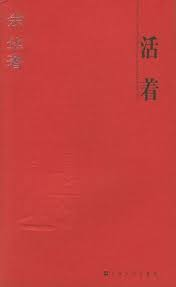
- The book cover of To Live
- Author: Yu Hua
- Original title: 活着/活著 – huózhe
- Translator: Michael Berry
- Language: Chinese
- Genre: Novel
- Publisher: Anchor Books & Random House of Canada Limited
- Publication date: 1993
- Publication place: China
- English publication date: 2003
- Media type: Print (Hardback & Paperback)
- Pages: 235
- ISBN: 1-4000-3186-9

To Live (simplified Chinese: 活着; traditional Chinese: 活著; pinyin: Huózhe) is a novel written by Chinese novelist Yu Hua in 1993. It follows the life of Xu Fugui as he transforms from the selfish idling son of a wealthy landowner to a solitary peasant during the Chinese Communist Revolution.

The story begins with the narrator traveling through the Chinese countryside to collect folk songs and local legends when he hears an old peasant's life story, which encompasses major historical events in China. Over the course of the story, Fugui describes witnessing the deaths of all his family members and loved ones.

The book was originally published in the Shanghai literary journal Harvest (traditional Chinese: 收穫; simplified Chinese: 收获). It has since been translated into more than a dozen languages. A film rendition, directed by Zhang Yimou, was released in 1994. The novel has also been adapted into a television series and stage play.

== Author ==
To Live, often regarded as his magnum opus, reflects Yu Hua's ability to intertwine personal tragedies with historical upheavals. Inspired by the resilience of ordinary individuals, the novel remains a cornerstone of modern Chinese literature, establishing Yu Hua as a powerful voice in capturing the human condition.

== Inspiration ==
Yu Hua was inspired and deeply moved by the American folk song "Old Black Joe". The song, written by Stephen Foster in the 19th century, reflects themes of nostalgia, loss, and resilience. These sentiments deeply resonated with Yu Hua, inspiring him to create a story that similarly portrays the quiet endurance of ordinary individuals amidst life's adversities. The song's simple yet profound message became a guiding metaphor for Fugui's life journey in To Live.

Yu Hua's inspiration for To Live also stems from his personal experiences growing up in a rapidly changing China. Witnessing societal upheavals and the resilience of those around him, he sought to capture the essence of survival and dignity in his writing. These observations, combined with the universal themes of 'Old Black Joe,' laid the foundation for this powerful narrative.

== Background ==
The novel describes a series of tragedies based on the context, including Chinese civil war, the Land Reform, Great Leap Forward, Great Chinese Famine, Three-anti and Five-anti Campaigns, and the Cultural Revolution. It allows the readers to see the cruelty of war, witnesses the deified Chinese political figures, thoughts, and movements. Covered by Mao's government propaganda, the deployed innovative farming techniques encountered failure and led to mass starvation and death, along with various political campaigns and struggles. Ordinary people like Fugui were the greatest casualties.

== Characters ==
- The Narrator "I": A popular folk song collector who comes to the countryside where Fugui lives. He listens to Fugui's story and records it.

=== Xu family ===
- Xu Fugui (徐福贵(Simplified)；徐福貴(Traditional))

The protagonist of the book. As the son of a landlord, Fugui spends his youth in a luxurious lifestyle and only devotes to gambling and interacting with prostitutes. After Fugui gambles away everything and goes through all the hardships, he becomes an honest and caring peasant. The story also talks about how events such as the Great Leap and Cultural Revolution have affected Fugui's and the Xu's life. At the end of the story, Fugui is alone with the only ox in the field.

Yu Hua commented Fugui as "After going through much pain and hardship, Fugui is inextricably tied to the experience of suffering. So there is really no place for ideas like 'resistance' in Fugui's mind—he lives simply to live. In this world I have never met anyone who has as much respect for life as Fugui. Although he has more reason to die than most people, he keeps on living."

The tragedy of Xu Fugui's life primarily stems from his incorrect outlook on life. He failed to appreciate and cherish wealth, developed many bad habits, and disregarded his family's advice. He squandered his fortune in casinos, eventually leading him into extreme poverty. Even after falling into hard times, Xu Fugui did not change his habits. As a result, his life spiraled into a vicious cycle, leading to the death of his parents, wife, and children. In the end, he was left alone, living a numb and poor existence. This tragic outcome is a result of Xu Fugui's failure to establish a correct worldview and values, his laziness, and his inability to save his family after they fell into poverty. He even used fate as an excuse to cover for his own mistakes.

- Jiazhen (陈家珍(Simplified)；陳家珍(Traditional))

Fugui's wife, Fengxia, and Youqing's mother. Jiazhen is the daughter of the rice merchant Chen Ji. After Fugui loses all family fortunes, Jiazhen leaves at the beginning. But after knowing Fugui quits gambling, she comes back to support Fugui, bears all hardships and hard work with Fugui, no matter what kind of challenge is in front of them. She is a kind-hearted and tenacious woman who has never made a complaint despite all the struggles and hardships, but she dies of soft bone disease under the loss of both her son and daughter.

Jiazhen is a crucial character in the story, portrayed as a strong woman who not only supports her husband through difficult times but also embodies maternal love and responsibility amidst a life full of hardships. Her character highlights the role of women in the family, with her resilience and sacrificial spirit holding profound significance in the novel. The love story between her and Fugui also reflects the emotional challenges within family life. However, despite the many admirable qualities Yu Hua endows her with, Jiazhen's character is often depicted as secondary to Fugui's. Throughout the story, she lacks independent thoughts and a life of her own, and her existence appears to revolve around Fugui. This portrayal of Jiazhen reflects a feudal female image, underscoring the oppressive influence of the feudal mentality that perpetuates the notion of "marry a chicken, follow the chicken" highlighting the societal constraints imposed on women.

- Xu Fengxia (徐凤霞(Simplified)；徐鳳霞(Traditional))

Fugui and Jiazhen's daughter, Youqing's elder sister. Fengxia becomes deaf and mute because of a fever, but she is just as beautiful and kind-hearted as her mother. This diligent and caring girl later gets happily married to Erxi. However, only after a short period of happiness, she dies while giving birth to their son Kugen.

- Xu Youqing (徐有庆(Simplified)；徐有慶(Traditional))

Fugui and Jiazhen's son. Because of the poor family situation, Youqing learns to take responsibility and help out the family as a child. The long distance between school and home makes him a great runner and makes his gym teacher loves him a lot. This kind boy later dies of donating too much blood to the magistrate's (Chunsheng's) wife.

- Wan Erxi (万二喜(Simplified)；萬二喜(Traditional))

Fengxia's husband. Erxi is a construction worker who has a crooked head. This quiet and honest man is deeply in love with his wife Fengxia, and after her death, he decides to only live for their son. Erxi later dies in a construction accident.

- Kugen (苦根(Simplified and Traditional))

Fengxia and Erxi's son. After both of his parents' deaths, Kugen starts to live with his grandfather Fugui and still cannot escape from poverty. He dies choking on beans Fugui prepared for him.

=== Other characters ===
- Long Er (龙二)

A gambler who comes after the Japanese surrender. He takes Mr. Shen's place as the top gambler in the town. After Fugui loses all his property to him, he also takes away the Xu family's house. Long Er is finally executed during the Chinese Land Reform Movement as a landlord.

- Chunsheng (春生)

A young boy Fugui meets on the battlefield. Fugui and Chunsheng has good friendship with each other. He later becomes the County Magistrate. In order to save his wife, who is the principal of Youqing, students are forced to donate their blood. Youqing dies because of being taken too much blood. He tries so hard to achieve Fugui and Fengxia's forgiveness. Later, during the Cultural Revolution, Chunsheng is labeled "anti-government" and he commits suicide.

- Old Quan (老全)

A veteran soldier Fugui meets in the cannon battalion. He used to be a deserter who ran away seven times. Though once he escapes from one unit, he can be captured by other units sooner than later. Old Quan, Fugui, and Chunsheng support each other when the unit is surrounded by the Liberation Army. He is killed by a straying bullet on the battlefield.

- Team Leader

The one who is in charge of the production and management of the village. He is implicated in the Cultural Revolution. He also is the matchmaker of Fengxia and Erxi's marriage.

- "FuGui" The Ox

This old ox Xu Fugui buys after begging for the butcher's mercy. Thus "Fugui" the ox, as a survivor of the butcher's knife, is actually a stand-in for Xu Fugui himself as a survivor of brutal reality and oppressions.

== Synopsis ==
To Live includes 11 chapters in total and one preface from Yu Hua.

=== Chapter 1 ===
While collecting popular folk songs in the countryside, the narrator "I" meets an old man named Xu Fugui, who talks to a plowing ox. He yells the names of six or seven oxen with only one ox present, so "I" talk to him and start a conversation about his past story. As the son of the landlord, Fu Gui says he is a prodigal son of the Xu family. He spends most of his life in gambling dens and brothels. He also treats his pregnant wife Jia Zhen badly. She kneels and begs Fu Gui to come home, and he chooses to have Jiazhen thrown out.

=== Chapter 2 ===
Eventually, Fugui loses his entire family fortune to Long Er. In order to pay off the debt, Fugui's father has to exchange their lands and house for copper cash and lets Fugui pick his way to pay off the gambling debt. Long Er became the owner of the lands and the house. Soon after moving out of their family house, Fugui's father, unfortunately, dies. Jiazhen, with her unborn son, is then picked up by a carriage sent by her father, Fugui's father-in-law. Fengxia, Fugui's elder daughter, is left behind with the Xu's.

=== Chapter 3 ===
To support his family, Fugui rents five mu of land from Long Er, the new landlord, and becomes a hardworking farmer. Fugui also meets the faithful old servant Changgen, who has become a beggar since the Xu's decline. But he still refuses to stay with Fugui's family. He gives Fengxia a gift once, and Fugui never sees him again after that. Finally, after a few months, Jiazhen comes back with her newborn son, Youqin. However, Fugui's mother then becomes ill, and on Fugui's way to seek medication for her, he is forcibly conscripted into the Nationalist Army.

=== Chapter 4 ===
In the military, Fugui suffers from hunger, cold, and death threat. He also witnesses the cruelty of the Chinese Civil War with Chunsheng and Old Quan. After almost two years of conscription, Fugui was finally sent home by the Liberation Army. Upon returning home years later, Fugui learns that his mother has died months after Fugui entered the army. A high fever has left his daughter Fengxia deaf and mute. During the land reform, the five mu of land Fugui rents before the war is now owned by him. Long Er is executed as a landlord during the reform.

=== Chapter 5 ===
To send Youqing to school, Fugui and Jiazhen decide to give Fengxia away to the family interest in getting a daughter-in-law. Months later, Fengxia comes back on her own because she misses her family. And Fugui does not want her to go back anymore as he finds out how much he loves his daughter. In 1958, people's communes were established. Most of the family supplies and properties (land, livestock) are confiscated by the village. The Great Leap Forward also starts, villagers' ironwares, including pots, are crackdowns to smelt iron.

=== Chapter 6 ===
Jiazhen, unfortunately, gets "soft bone" disease, and her condition worsens day by day. She can hardly stand up and work. Meanwhile, Fugui's family accidentally manufactures steel and receives praise from the team leader.

=== Chapter 7 ===
The people's commune shuts down the dining hall, leading to starvation in the village and town. Many people cannot even eat a grain of rice for months—Jiazhen's father supports the Xu's with a small bag of rice, along with grassroots and barks, the Xu's manages to survive.

=== Chapter 8 ===
Things finally get better after the grain harvest. Though, to save the wife of the county magistrate from losing too much blood while giving birth, Youqin dies from the over-blood donation. When Fugui discovers that the magistrate is his old-time friend Chunsheng, he cannot drive himself to get revenge anymore. A grieving Jiazhen also rejects Chunsheng's compensation for Youqing. Years later, the Cultural Revolution starts.

=== Chapter 9 ===
Fengxia meets Erxi, who has a crooked head. The village cadre has proposed Erxi as a suitor to Fengxia, advising that as Erxi is the leader of the local Red Guards, it would be very beneficial to Fugui and his family if they were to marry. Despite Erxi's quiet and introverted demeanour, he is a trustworthy and considerate man, instructing his Red Guards to help repair the roof of the Xu house. He soon asks Fugui for his blessing to marry Fengxia, which he eagerly grants. Every one of the Xus is happy with their marriage.

=== Chapter 10 ===
As the Cultural Revolution grows more intense, the Red Guards punish the team leader and Chunsheng, the magistrate, as "capitalist roaders" accuse them of oppressing and belittling the people and peasants. Chunsheng sneaks to meet the Xus once, and Jiazhen chooses to forgive him and ask him to hang on, saying "You still owe us a life, hold on to your life to repay us." Though after a month of torture, Chunsheng commits suicide. After that, Fengxia and Erxi came back to serve old Fugui and Jiazhen. Fengxia then gives birth to her first son, Kugen.

=== Chapter 11 ===
Fengxia dies in the delivery room due to hemorrhaging. Soon after that, Jiazhen passes away. Fugui moves into town and lives with Kugen and Erxi. When Kugen is four years old, Erxi is killed by two hard slabs of cement. Fugui then has to live with his only remaining family—grandson Kugen in the village till Kugen is seven. He chokes to death while eating beans. All by himself, Fugui saves up some money and buys an old ox from the butcher to accompany him, naming it "Fugui".

== Theme ==
=== Philosophy of life ===
What people in To Live do throughout their lives is not to fight against tragic fate and suffering or die to prove the greatness and value of their lives; on the contrary, they obey and endure in silence and challenge death by staying alive with determination and glimmer of hope. At the end of the story, Fugui ends up with an old ox but still enjoys the rest of his life in peace and calm. Surviving from a catalog of misfortunes, Fugui's persistence, and self-relief after tragedies are valuable attitudes Yu Hua sees among ordinary lives.

== Genre ==
=== From Avant-garde fiction to Literary Realism ===
Since the disintegration of the avant-garde novel, Yu Hua's novel writing has undergone significant changes. This change is marked by his three full-length novels, Cries in the Drizzles, To Live, and Chronicle of a Blood Merchant.

In the 1990s, Yu Hua's personal life underwent important changes. One of the most significant changes was the birth of his son. The sense of responsibility of becoming a father not only strengthened and enriched Yu Hua's understanding of "lives" but also became an opportunity for Yu Hua's creative transformation in the 1990s. To Live is a symbol of Yu Hua's transformation. By applying Realism to his work, Yu Hua was able to describe real-life in an observant and revealing form. Realism also enables him to describe realistic tragedies among lower classes during the special historical period in a more detailed and unembellished style.

From short stories to long ones, Yu Hua's stories have become more comprehensive. While dark humor is still a highlighting feature of his work, his focus has switched from blood and death to the reflection on the reality of society and the life of the general public. His works of this period were well recognized by readers and received praise.

== Writing style ==
Yu Hua uses a narrative style similar to zero-intervention to present the tragic beauty of To Live. The author can exclude the subject from making explicit value judgments and emotional penetration of the suffering life, as if standing in a "non-earthly position" and objectively and calmly narrating the human suffering. The use of an objective and neutral narrative position with a warm and deep emotional tone in the text makes To Live a symbol of Yu Hua's stylistic transformation.

The novel's use of symbolism is to use death to symbolize living. Few people may encounter the pain of sending away the gray-haired to the black-haired, and the gray-haired sending away the black-haired one by one may only be seen in fiction.The truth of art will make people believe that not only has there been a living Fugui in the world, but there will be many more in the future and invisibly anguishing in the dark side of society. In To Live, Yu Hua incorporates many of his concerns about the society and people, revealing those small but great people who struggle in the midst of it. At this time, Yu Hua's linguistic narrative has departed from objective and indifferent narration.

As Zhang Xuexin comments it, "Yu Hua turned to a serious exploration of survival at that stage, and the novels of this period can be called 'survival novels': they are 'grounded in the breadth and depth of the writer's thinking and imagination about the state of human existence', showing both 'a picture of the human state' and expressing 'the inner voice of the human soul in front of suffering and fate.'" In short, Yu Hua's creative turn at this stage is characterized by a shift from "formal avant-grading" to "ordinaries' survival".

== Awards ==
- Grinzane Cavour Prize (1998)
- Won the Hong Kong Boyi Top 15 Good Books Awards (1994)
- Won the third World Chinese Bing Xin Literature Award. (2002)

== Adaptations ==
=== Film ===
A film adaption (To Live) of this book starring well-known actors such as Gong Li and Ge You was released in 1994, premiering at the New York Film Festival, after numerous discussions between film director Zhang Yimou and the novelist author Yu Hua upon the proper film adaptation, keeping the plot within the frame of Yu Hua's artistic vision. Yu Hua has previously stated that he prefers his own novel to the film. The film changes the setting from rural southern China to a small city in northern China and added the element of shadow puppetry. The second narrator and the ox are not present in the film.

Michael Berry, the translator of the English edition of the novel To Live, has said that the novel has a "darker and more existential" message and a "much more brutal" reality and social critique, while the film renders the failure of Communist ideals and capitalist China as a more optimistic future. Berry says that the film "allows more room for the hand of fate to hold sway." When first released, the movie was officially banned by the Chinese government but was still shown in theaters in China.

=== Television series ===
On December 16, 2005, the 33-episode television series adaptation, Fugui 富贵 was broadcast on Chinese television. Directed by Zhu Zheng, the TV series features lesser-known actors and actresses such as Chen Chuang (陈创) as Fugui and Liu Mintao (刘敏涛) as Jiazhen.

=== Stage play ===
Two decades after the novel's release, it was adapted into a stage play titled To Live 活着 directed by influential contemporary drama director, Meng Jinghui (孟京辉) and starring actors Huang Bo (黄渤) as Fugui and Yuan Quan (袁泉) as Jiazhen. The play premiered at the National Centre for the Performing Arts in Beijing between September 4, 2012 to September 9, 2012, and later made its way to cities such as Hangzhou, Shanghai, Guangzhou, Shenzhen, Hong Kong and Taipei.
