= Index of sociology articles =

This is an index of sociology articles. For a shorter list, see List of basic sociology topics.

== A ==
ableism — abortion — absolute poverty — achieved status — acute disease — adaptation — adultism — affect control theory — affirmative action — affluent alienation — age grade — age structure — aging in place — ageism — agency — AGIL Paradigm — aggregate — agrarian society — agribusiness — AIDS — air pollution — alcoholism — altermodern — alienation — alien land law — alternative society — altruism — alzheimer's disease — Amae — amalgamation — Americanization — Anabaptist — anarchy — androgyny — animal abuse — animism — anomia — anomie — anthropology — antipositivism — antisemitism — apartheid — apollonian — applied science — approach — appropriate technology — The Archaeology of Knowledge — arms race — arms trade — arranged marriage — asceticism — Asch conformity experiments — ascribed status — assimilation — assisted living — attribution theory — autarky — authentic act — authoritarian personality — authoritarianism — authority — autocracy — automation — avant-garde

== B ==
baby boomer — balance of power — base and superstructure — The Bell Curve — belonging — berdache — biological determinism — bioethics — biosocial theory — Black Power — Black Panther Party — blended family — Boomerang Generation — bourgeoisie — brainwashing — bricolage — bureaucracy — bureaucratic collectivism — bystander effect

== C ==
capitalism — carrying capacity — cash crop — caste — Catholic Worker — Catholicism — causation — cause marketing — charismatic movement — CBD — Chicago Area Project — Chicago school — Chicano — child labor — chronic disease — church — citizenship — civil disorder — civil inattention — civil religion — civil rights — civil society — clan — class — class conflict — class consciousness — classism — cognition — cohabitation — cold war — collective action — collective behavior — collective consciousness —collective punishment — collective representation — collective violence — colonialism — commodity — commodity chain — commodity fetishism — communal riot — communication — communism — community — community care — comparable worth — comparative sociology — complex society — computational sociology — conflict theory — conformity — conglomerates — conscience collective — consciousness — consensus decision-making — consensus reality —consumerism — content analysis — contingent work — contradiction — conversation analysis — core countries — corporation — correlation — corruption — Counterculture — counter-revolutionary — coup d'état — created environment — creole language — crime — critical theory — crowd psychology — crude birth rate — crude death rate — cult — cultural bias — cultural capital — cultural deprivation — cultural imperialism — cultural lag — cultural materialism — cultural pluralism — cultural relativism — cultural reproduction — cultural system — cultural transmission — cultural universal — culture — culture of poverty — culture wars — curative medicine

== D ==
Darwinism — death — debt bondage — deconstruction — defensive medicine — deforestation — deinstitutionalisation — democracy — demographic transition — demography — dependency theory — dependent variable — depletion — desertification — deskilling — deterrence theory — devaluation — developmental state — deviance — deviance amplification — deviant subculture — dialectic — diaspora — differential association — differentiation — diffusion — dionysian — discourse — discrimination — division of labour — domestic worker — domestic violence — double standard — doubling time — dramaturgical perspective — Disneyfication — dyad — dysfunction — dystopia

== E ==
ecology — economic determinism — ecological modernization — economic interdependence — economies of scale — economy — ecosystem — education — education system — egalitarianism — elder abuse — elite — elite religion — embourgeoisement thesis — emigration — empirical studies — encounter — endogamy — entrepreneur — entropy — environmentalism — environmental sociology — epistemology — estate — ethnic group — ethnic minority — ethnocentrism — ethnography — ethnomethodology — ethnostatistics - eutrophication — evolution — evolutionary sociology — evolutionism — exclusivist — existentialism — exogamy — experiment — exponential growth — export-processing zone — extended family

== F ==
false consciousness — family — fascism — fecundity — feedback — femininity — feminism — Ferdinand Tönnies Society — fertility — fetishism — feudalism — First World — flextime plan — folk religion — forces of production — Fordism — forms of activity and interpersonal relations — functionalism — fundamentalism — futures studies — futurist — futurology

== G ==
gang — GDP — Gemeinschaft and Gesellschaft — gender — gendered division of labour — gendering — genealogy of power/knowledge — generalized other — genetic engineering — genocide — gentrification — geopolitics — German Society for Sociology — gestalt psychology — ghetto — globalization — Glocalization — GNP — government — Great Depression — grounded theory — group action — group behaviour — group dynamics — The Great Transformation — Green Revolution — greenhouse effect — guerrilla movement

== H ==
habitus — health maintenance organization — hegemony — heterophobia — heterosexuality — hidden curriculum — higher circles — higher education — Hispanic — historical materialism — historical sociology — holocaust — homelessness — homophobia — homosexuality — house work — hunter-gatherer — human ecology — hybridity — hyperreality — hypothesis — honor killing

== I ==
'I' and the 'me' — iatrogenesis — ideal type — identity — identity politics — ideology — imagined communities — immigration — imperialism — ingroup and out-group — income — independent variable — industrial democracy — industrial production — industrial society — industrial sociology — industrialisation — industrialization of war — infant mortality— informal economy — information technology —infrastructure — inner city — instinct — institution — institutional discrimination — imprinting — institutional racism — insurgency — intelligence — intelligence quotient — intelligentsia — intentional community — interaction — interest group — intergenerational mobility — internal colonialism — international division of labor — interpersonal violence — interpretive

== J ==
Japanization — Jim Crow laws — jingoism — Judaism — justice, distributive — juvenile delinquency

== K ==
kin selection — kinship — kindness

== L ==
labeling theory — labour power — laissez-faire — late modernity — Latino/a — latent function — law — legitimacy — legitimation crisis — Leipzig school — lesbianism — liberal democracy — life-course — life-cycle — life expectancy — lifeworld — limited war — literacy — local knowledge — longevity — longitudinal study — looking-glass self — love — luddite — lumpenproletariat

== M ==
macrosociology — malthusianism — managed care —managerial class — manifest function — marginalization — marriage — Marxism — masculinity — mass action — mass media — mass society — master status — materialism — matriarchy — matrilineality — matrilocal residence — McDonaldization — mean — means of production — mechanical solidarity — mechanization — median — medicaid — medical gaze — medical model — medicalization — medicare — megalopolis — mental disorder —mercantilism — medical sociology — meritocracy — metanarrative — methodology — microsociology — middle class — militarism — military-industrial complex — millenarianism — minority group — mixed economy — mode — mode of production — mode of reproduction — modernity — modernization — monogamy — monopoly — monotheism — moral panic — mores — mortality rate — multiculturalism — multilineal evolution — multinational corporation — murder

== N ==
nation state — nationalism — nature — neocolonialism — neoliberalism — neo-locality — new international division of labour — non-state actor — non-tariff barriers to trade — norm — normal type — normlessness — nuclear family

== O ==
objectivity — oligarchy — oligopoly — ontological security — ontology — organic solidarity — organization — organization studies — organized crime

== P ==
paradigm — participant observation — participatory democracy — pastoral society — Passing - patient dumping — patriarchy — patrilineality — peasant — peer group — periphery countries — phenomenology — Physician Assistant — plea bargaining — pluralism — pluralist theory — police brutality — political economy — political party — politics — political sociology — pollution — polyandry — polyarchy — polygamy — polygyny — polylogism — polytheism — popular culture — positivism — post-Fordism — post-realism — post-structuralism — post-industrial society — postmodernism — postmodernity — poverty — power — power elite — pragmatism — on pragmatic sociology, for now, see: George Herbert Mead — prejudice — primary deviance — Primary and secondary groups — primary labor market — primary sector — private health care — privatism — profanity — professionalism — proletariat — prostitution — proto-globalization — psychopathy — psychosis — public order crime — public health — public sphere — purchasing power parity —

== Q ==
qualitative research — quantitative research

== R ==
race — racism — radical — rape — rationality — rationalization — realism — rebellion — recidivism — reciprocity — reductionism — reflexivity — reform movement — reify — relations of production — relative deprivation — relative poverty — relativism — religion — remodernism — representative democracy — research methods — reserve army of labour — resocialization — retirement home — revolution — riot — risk — rite of passage — ritual — role — role conflict — rural sociology — ruling class

== S ==
sacred — sampling — sanction — Sapir–Whorf hypothesis — scapegoating — schizophrenia — science — scientific management — Second World — secondary data — secondary deviance — secondary group — secondary labor market — sect — secularization — self — self-consciousness — semi-periphery countries — semiotics — serial monogamy — serial reciprocity — sex role — sexism — sexual harassment — sexual script — sick role — significant other — simulation — snowball sampling — for entries beginning with social, see sections below — socialism — socialization — society — sociobiology — sociocultural context — sociocultural evolution — for entries beginning with sociological, see sections below — sociology — for entries beginning with sociology of, see sections below — solid waste — solidarity — sovereignty — split labor market theory — standing army — state (polity) — stateless nation — status — status generalization — status group — status inconsistency — status offense — stem cell — stepfamily — stereotype — stigma — Strategic Defense Initiative — stratification — strike — structural unemployment — structuration — structure — subculture — suburbanization — surplus value — surveillance — survey — symbol — Symbolic Convergence Theory — symbolic interactionism — symbolic system — systems theory

=== Social ===
social actions — social activism — social analysis — social animal — social anthropology — social assistance — social artifact — social attitude — social balance theory — social behavior — social bookmarking — social capital — social center — social change — social character — social chauvinism — social choice function — social choice theory — social circle — social class — social club — social closure — social cognition — social commentary — social complexity — social computing — social condenser — social conflict — social conservatism — social contact — social contract — social construction — social constructionism — social construction of technology — social context — social control — social cost — Social Credit — social cycle theory — social dance — social Darwinism — social democracy — social demography — social diffusion theory — social dilemma — social disobedience — social ecology — social effect of evolutionary theory — social effects of rock and roll — social elite — social engineering — social environment — social enterprise — social epistemology — social equality — social evolution — social exchange theory — social fact — social phobia — social forces — social forum — social function — social geography — social geometry — social good — social group — social guidance film — social hacking — social hierarchy — social history — social housing — social hygiene movement — social identity — social implosion — social indicator — social inequality — social influence — social informatics — social infrastructure — social injustice — social insect — social institution — social insurance — social interaction — social issues — social judgment theory — social justice — social learning theory — social liberalism — social life — social loafing — social mania — social model of disability — social mobility — social movement — social network — social norm — social order — social organization — social parasitism — social phenomenon — social philosophy — social policy — social position — social positivism — social power — social pressure — social prestige — social problem — social progress — social psychology — social rank — social reality — social reform — social relation - social reproduction — social research — social resonance — social responsibility — social risk — social risk positions — social robot — social role — social rule — social sciences — social simulation — social skills — social space — social statistics — social status — social stereotype — social stigma — social stratification — social structure — social studies — social support — social theory — social unrest — social work — social trend — social science fiction — Social Solidarity

=== Sociological ===
sociology books — sociological framework — sociological imagination — sociological naturalism — sociological perspective — sociological positivism — sociological theory

=== Sociology of ===
See Subfields of sociology for the full list of subfields of sociology

sociology of aging — sociology of architecture — sociology of art — sociology of the body — sociology of childhood — sociology of conflict — sociology of deviance — sociology of disaster — sociology of education — sociology of emotions — sociology of the family — sociology of fatherhood — sociology of film — sociology of food — sociology of gender — sociology of government — sociology of the history of science — sociology of immigration — sociology of knowledge — sociology of language — sociology of law — sociology of leisure — sociology of markets — sociology of medicine — sociology of the military — sociology of music — sociology of punishment — sociology of race — sociology of religion — sociology of science and technology — sociology of sport — sociology of terrorism — sociology of work-sociology of motherhood

== T ==
taboo — Taylorization — technology — terrorism — tertiary sector of economic activity — the Enlightenment — the Renaissance — theory — Third World — total institution — total war — totalitarianism — totemism — trading network — traditional state — transgender — transnational company — trust — temperament

== U ==
unconscious — underclass — underdevelopment — unemployment — unilineal evolution — unintended consequences — unions — universal health care — upper class — urban ecology — urban renewal — urbanism — urbanization — urban sociology

== V ==
value — value-added theory — verstehen — vertical mobility — Vested interest (communication theory) — victimless crime — violence — visual sociology

== W ==
Wage labour — wealth — wealthfare — welfare — welfare state — whisper campaign — white-collar crime — white flight — white guilt — white privilege — women's liberation movement — work - working class — world-systems theory

== X ==
xenophobia — xenocentrism

== Y ==
youth — youth subculture — youth welfare

== Z ==
zero population growth

Please help the Wikipedia sociology project by adding relevant articles to this list. Articles marked red are yet to be created.
