= Eileen Cheng-yin Chow =

Sinologist, teacher and translator

Eileen Chengyin Chow (Chinese: 周成蔭) is a Taiwanese sinologist, Chinese translator and University Teacher. She works for the Duke University and for the Shih Hsin University in Taipei, Taiwan.

She graduated in literature from Harvard University and studied her Ph.D. in comparative literature at Stanford University. Together with Carlos Rojas, in 2009 she translated to English Brothers, the longest novel written by the Chinese novelist Yu Hua. The novel was shortlisted for the Man Asian Literary Prize and was awarded France's Prix Courrier International in 2008.

She is director of the Cheng Shewo Institute of Chinese Journalism at the Shih Hsin University.

She is the granddaughter of Cheng Shewo, a journalist, publisher, and educator of the Republic of China, who founded the Shih Hsin University in Taiwan, and the niece of Taiwanese sociologist Lucie Cheng.

== Selected publications ==
- Rojas, C., and E. C. Y. Chow. Rethinking chinese popular culture: Cannibalizations of the canon, 2008. ISBN 9781134032242
- Yu, H. Brothers: A Novel by Yu Hua. Translated by Carlos Rojas and E. Cheng-yin Chow. Pantheon, 2009. ISBN 9780307386069
- Rojas, C., and Eileen Cheng-yin Chow, eds. The Oxford Handbook of Chinese Cinemas. New York: Oxford University Press, 2013. ISBN 9780199765607
- Rojas, C., and E. Chow, eds. Oxford Handbook of Chinese Cinemas. Oxford University Press, 2013
- Lung Yingtai, translated by Eileen Cheng-yin Chow: 1949: China, Trauma and Memory, Los Angeles Review of Books, 2020. ISBN 9781940660691
