= Economic imperialism =

Foreign control of assets and decisions

Economic imperialism is the foreign control of assets and decisions, even when such control exists in practice but not in law. It can occur in both informal, postcolonial settings as well as formal, colonial ones, and involves the one-sided transfer of capital, labour, or natural resources from one nation to another.

In 1921, French Professor Achille Viallate (1866-1943) discussed economic imperialism as a trade and finance phenomenon in terms of "imperialist expansion [...] dictated by the desire of 'the great industrial nations' to find 'outlets both for the utilization of their available capital and for the surplus of their production'."

== Definition and contexts ==
Scholars have identified five modes of economic imperialism: colonialism, internal colonialism, settler colonialism, investment imperialism, and unequal exchange.

=== Colonialism ===
Colonialism is a system of domination characterised by a foreign group's control over another territory, its natural resources, and its people. It is most often applied to the domination of European societies over non-European ones via conquest and settlement from the Age of Discovery in the 15th century to decolonisation in the 20th century, however historical examples also include Europeans colonising other Europeans and non-Europeans colonising other non-Europeans. While colonialism sometimes indirectly led to development dependent on the autonomy/independence of the colonised population and their position in the international division of labour, it was overall harmful due to its role in the history of genocides, famine, and war, and evidenced by the poles of contemporary global inequality. Regions that were relatively rich in 1500 and were subsequently colonised became relatively poor.

Early industrial societies exported their unemployment (caused by technical change and the displacement of small producers) to their colonies, either through settler migration or through enforcing free trade and flooding colonial markets with goods produced in the metropole (causing unemployment in the colony). An example of this was the deindustrialisation of India under British rule. Natural resources from colonies also fueled the metropole's industrial development, and the nature of colonial trade meant colonies were effectively paid for their exports out of their tax revenue, effectively eliminating their export surpluses. This all served to drain wealth from the colonies.

=== Internal colonialism ===
Internal colonialism is the uneven effects of economic development on a regional basis, otherwise known as "uneven development", as a result of the exploitation of minority groups within a wider society which leads to political and economic inequalities between regions within a state. It is "a geographically-based pattern of subordination of a differentiated population, located within the dominant power or country". Internal colonies provide the metropole with accessible, cheap, disposable labour, land, and natural resources.

Historical examples identified by scholars have included the United States and African Americans and Chicanos, the United Kingdom and Ireland, and the Soviet Union and Ukraine.

=== Settler colonialism ===
Settler colonialism is "a specific mode of domination where a community of exogenous settlers permanently displaces to a new locale, eliminates or displaces indigenous populations and sovereignties, and constitutes an autonomous political body". It involves "land confiscation, the expulsion of the indigenous population, and the dispossession of its wealth and property". Settler colonies have also tended to subject indigenous populations to dual labour markets and economic exploitation more often associated with internal colonialism. They typically can develop independently through "accumulation by dispossession".

=== Investment imperialism ===
Investment imperialism refers to the export of capital, in the form of foreign direct investment (FDI), portfolio investment, and loans, as a form of economic imperialism. Both John Hobson and Vladimir Lenin saw the export of capital as resulting from economic inequality, which caused a savings glut (excessive wealth) among the rich and underconsumption among the poor. This underconsumption, combined with domestic competition, led to a lack of opportunities for high-return investment, thereby incentivising investment in foreign markets. This investment can build pressure for political or military intervention due to the desire to protect high returns. The Hobson-Lenin thesis has historically received criticism; scholars have acknowledged that this criticism stems from a misinterpretation.

In contrast, Britain and France reimported capital from earlier investments, draining capital from foreign markets. For Britain, property income derived from overseas outweighed capital outflows for most of the 19th century, with most of the outflows going to settler colonies. In underdeveloped countries, labour and natural resources were cheap enough that FDI was unnecessary. Likewise, the United States today is dependent on capital inflows from foreign markets. While British colonial investment in Africa did not produce superprofits, exploitation of labour ensured profitability, and exporting capital alleviated pressure from diminishing marginal returns in the metropole (i.e., less-profitable domestic alternatives), thereby improving the metropole's economic growth. While FDI is hypothetically conducive to diffusing technology and increasing living standards globally, in practice, after an initial growth spurt, if unregulated, it leads to monopolies and a net outflow of capital for dependent countries.

=== Unequal exchange ===
Unequal exchange refers to exploitation in international trade, where one country contributes more labour or ecological resources than it receives in exchange. This derives from higher wage rates in some countries which encourages capital-intensive rather than labour-intensive production, resulting in the "unequal exchange of labour time in monetarily equivalent trade between low-wage and high-wage countries in the world economy", where workers in one country can buy proportionately more of another country's output with one hour of their labour.

In developed countries, real wages rose from the late 19th century, following the success of the trade union movement, high demand for labour, and the implementation of mass democracy, which built political pressure to maintain this. On the contrary, underdeveloped countries saw deindustrialisation, disarticulation, and labour market segmentation in their dual economies, which resulted in low wages.

== Sources ==
- Harry Magdoff, Charles E. Nowell, Economic imperialism at the Encyclopædia Britannica
