= Jin Sha =

Jin Sha may refer to:

- Jin Sha (poet) (born 1924), or Cheng Youshu, Chinese diplomat and poet
- Jin Sha (singer) (born 1981), or Kym, Chinese singer and actress

== See also ==
- Jinsha (disambiguation)
