= Latina Transnational Motherhood =

Transnational motherhood is defined as "mothers from all backgrounds, cultures, ethnicities, and social locations who live in different countries from their dependent children and maintain emotional, economic, and communication links across geographical boundaries." It is the phenomenon of continuing to be a mother to your children from across national borders. It is typically a dynamic in which mothers from a poorer nation will migrate to a wealthier nation to work and provide for their families back home.

== Context ==
Mothering is usually understood as a practice with physical nurturing and the training of children for adulthood, with different variations of these practices that span across class, culture, and race. There has been a long legacy of African American women from the South who leave their biological children behind to seek work in more lucrative and accepting areas. Likewise, since around the early 1980s, thousands of Latin American women have made the trip northward, into the United States, in search of jobs in order to provide for their families in their country of origin. This pattern has given rise to what scholars call transnational motherhood, the phenomenon where women continue parenting across borders while working in another nation. They are physically separated because of the economic necessity to provide.

Latina transnational mothers are often employed as nannies, housekeepers, or caregivers. These are roles that require them to care for other families while being physically unable to take care of their own. This paradox has drawn attention in feminist and migration scholarship, highlighting how global care economies depend on the labor of migrant women, particularly from the Global South.

== Historical background ==
1965 is often regarded as one of the most significant years in U.S. immigration history. After the passage of the Immigration and Nationality Act of 1965, national origins quotas were eliminated. These quotas were established earlier in the 1900s to restrict so-called "undesirable" Europeans and effectively limit migration from Asia and Africa. While the 1965 Act was praised for its more egalitarian approach to race and ethnicity, it also introduced the first numerical caps on immigration from the Western Hemisphere, including Latin America. This marked a significant departure from previous policy, which had allowed relatively unrestricted migration from Mexico and other neighboring countries.

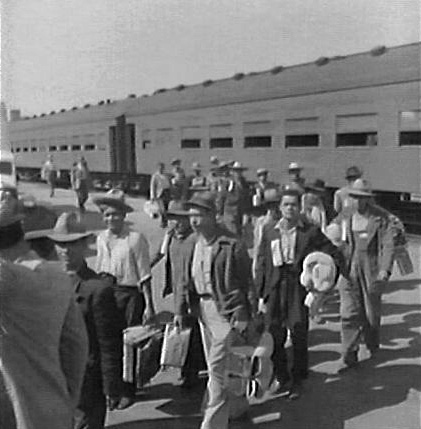
1942. Some of the original workers involved in the Bracero Program

Along with this new immigration act, the Bracero Program also ended in 1964. This, starting in 1942 at the behest of WW2, was a program that legally brought Mexican laborers into the United States to fill labor positions in the agricultural sector and expected them to return home after their work permits expired. Despite this program ending, the need for this labor persisted. In light of the new quotas that affected Latin migrants, a new form of migration occurred, being undocumented immigration, which was less circular and more permanent.

In 1986, the Immigration Reform and Control Act (IRCA) offered legalization to some undocumented migrants but also penalized employers for hiring undocumented workers and tightened border security, making circular migration more difficult. The Illegal Immigration Reform and Immigrant Responsibility Act of 1996 (IIRIRA) further intensified these effects by adding mandatory detention, a militarized border, increasing deportations, and imposing multi-year bans on reentry for migrants who overstayed their visas or entered without inspection. These acts ruptured many family structures and created a barrier for circular migration for these Latin immigrants. Furthermore, visa backlogs create a dilemma in which relatives may have to wait years or decades for entry or reunification. Without legal status, many mothers are barred from sponsoring their children.

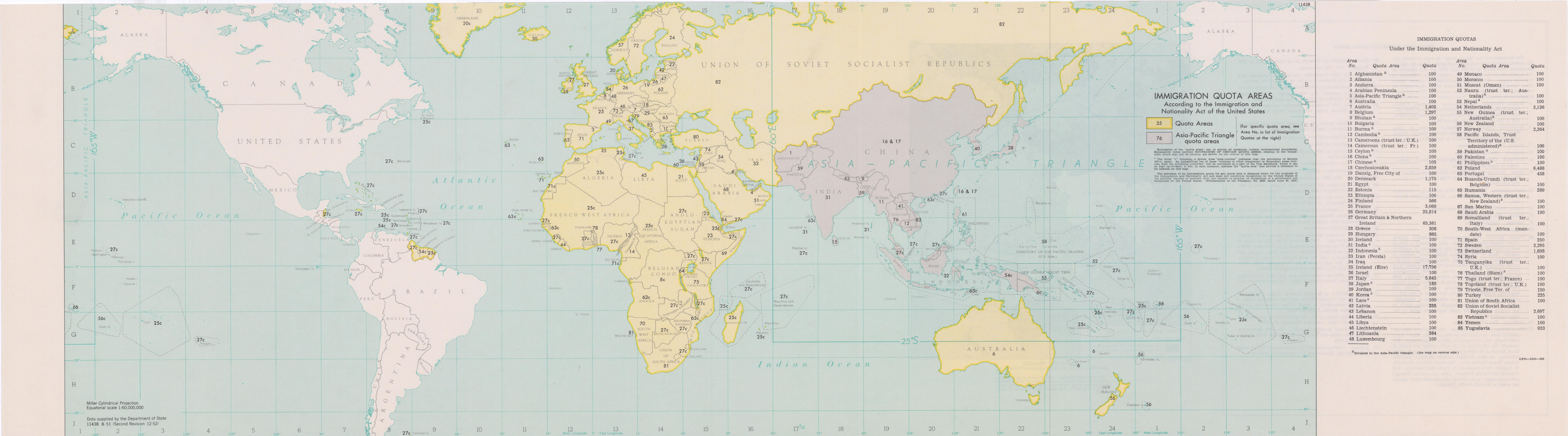
Immigration Quota Areas According to the Immigration and Nationality Act of the United States

This shift in migration patterns had a direct impact on family structures for migrants who could no longer move back and forth easily. Migrant women, especially from Mexico and Central America, began to enter the U.S. in growing numbers. Doing so, often these women would have to leave their children behind, and in the care of extended family members back in their home countries. This new kind of migration laid substantial groundwork for what would be later coined transnational motherhood, a form of motherhood that stretches across national borders.

== Push factors and country conditions ==
Over 50% of the immigrant population within the United States comes from Mexico and Latin America, the largest region where immigrants come from. The decision of Latina mothers to leave their children behind in their countries of origin to travel abroad for work is rooted in structural hardships and a lack of opportunity. These struggles range from nation to nation, race to race, and class to class, including poverty, gender inequality, political violence, and unstable economies. It is estimated that around 60% of migrants from Latin America immigrate for economic reasons. Many migrants list these conditions as not only struggles and motivation to immigrate, but a necessity for survival, in order to gain access for their families, food, housing, education, and healthcare.

Throughout the 1950s-1990s, much of Latin America was ruled by dictatorial governments and military juntas backed by Cold War geopolitics. Countries like El Salvador, Guatemala, Nicaragua, and Chile experienced periods of civil war, political repression, and widespread human rights violations. In Central America in particular, internal armed conflicts displaced thousands of families, while U.S. foreign policy played a significant role in funding or propping up anti-communist regimes. During the same period, many Latin American countries underwent economic restructuring under pressure from international lenders like the International Monetary Fund (IMF) and the World Bank. These structural adjustment programs often required governments to reduce spending on public services such as healthcare, education, and housing, disproportionately affecting women and children in working-class communities.

In light of all these struggles in Latin America, the United States has become a symbol and destination of economic opportunity and hope. Recent scholarship on transnational migration relate a great deal of the causation falls at the hand of the receiving nations' immigration policies. A lack of legal documentation or citizenship status is a major factor for migrants in determining whether to bring their children with them or leave them behind. Despite the perilous journey, legal barriers, and separation from family, the economic opportunity offered within the U.S. is seen as "worth it."

== Lived experience of transnational motherhood ==
Transnational motherhood is an often unrecognized and unexplored migration reality, lacking much media presentation. Being a transnational mother is to navigate the responsibilities of mothering across national borders, but also to continue to provide financially. Latina women who take on this role describe the process as a sacrifice, all in hopes of providing a better life for their children. Oftentimes, alternative caregivers, being extended family, are assigned to manage the role of parenting these children left behind. Many scholars describe migration as a strategy in which women ensure survival for both their children but also themselves. Motherhood is often defined in the traditional sense of physical presence and affection, yet, these transnational mothers redefine this connotation. In order to be involved with their children's lives, transnational Latina mothers have utilized gifts, frequent phone calls, video chats, and economic and emotional support from afar.

It is found that some transnational mothers experience emotional distress at the reality of leaving behind their children in their country of origin. This emotional distress varies from sadness to depressive symptoms. On top of this, the separation between mother and child causes detrimental effects on the intimacy of the relationship. With a lack of face-to-face contact and visits, the children feel abandoned and look to terminate the caring arrangements. This can lead to mothers resorting to an increase in monetary remedies and gifts.

Along with personal struggles over mothering and working, within the United States, these new Latina migrants are often faced with discrimination, xenophobia, and even violence. Studies show that Latin American migrants are viewed as the most negative of any migrants from four global regions (Asia, Europe, the Middle East, and Latin America). Through political rhetoric and media presentation, Latin American immigrants are viewed as the source of the American immigration "problem," making these transnational mothers' migration experience just that much more difficult.

== Gendered dimensions of migration and caregiving ==
Transnational mothers are not exclusively paid to do domestic work, but the work is organized in a way that creates separation and temporary work. Domestic workers forfeit the primary care of their biological families to take care of and provide for other, more privileged families. These jobs often require the worker to live-in, as the employers expect round-the-clock services. The expectations and work conditions of these Latina migrants further restrict their access to returning to their biological children. These occupations are almost exclusively gendered for females, where Latinas find a lot of their work. Scholars argue that this reflects a global "care chain", in which wealthier households in the Global North outsource their caregiving needs to poorer women, who in turn outsource their own caregiving responsibilities to extended family in their home countries.

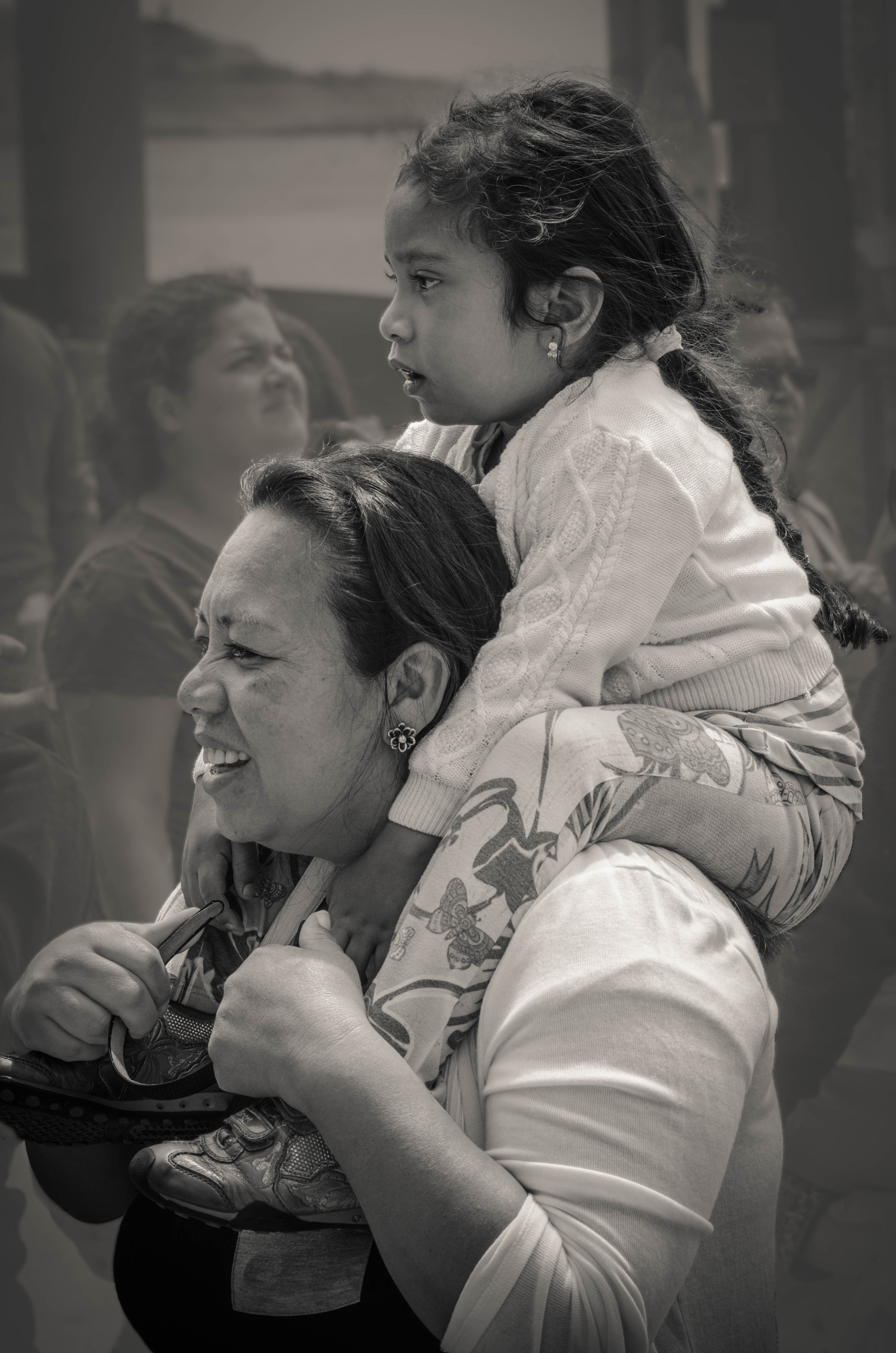
Although mothering is often associated with physical presence and care, transnational mothers must maintain their roles through emotional and economic support across borders.

The migration experience and contrast between Latino men is also apparent. Latino men, when they migrate, are expected to serve as the financial providers while their emotional distance from their children is socially tolerated and even normalized. Latina women, on the other hand, are still held responsible for emotional caregiving, even when they migrate to another nation. This leads to 'intensive mothering' from afar, for example, the as mentioned frequent phone calls, gifts, and financial and emotional support. Moreover, these mothers often face greater moral scrutiny than their male counterparts, as the act of leaving children behind contradicts dominant cultural narratives of "good motherhood." In some cases, transnational mothers are stigmatized as selfish or neglectful, even as they are also viewed as self-sacrificing providers.

== Relevance and challenges ==
Within the United States, 51.7% of immigrants are women. It is hard to determine how many of these migrant women are mothers separated from their children, but continued studies on transnational motherhood continue to expand, especially venturing into the well-being of the children of transnational families. Despite their economic contributions, many transnational mothers live in legal insecurity. This causes them to work in informal sectors with little access to labor rights, healthcare, or immigration pathways that would allow for family reunification. At the same time, their maternal roles are often stigmatized in both their nation of origin and within the U.S., where dominant cultural norms idealize physically present motherhood in contrast to their transnational form of motherhood.

Recent scholarship has emphasized the need for immigration policy reforms that consider the realities of transnational families. This is explored particularly by reducing visa delays, expanding protections for undocumented parents, and recognizing caregiving labor as essential work.
