= Primary labor market =

Labor market segment, economics

The primary labor market is a market that generally consists of high-wage paying jobs, social security, and longer-lasting careers, but others define it as jobs that "require formal education", but in addition to white collar jobs like teaching, accounting, and the law, it also includes the skilled trades like being a plumber or a photocopy repair technician. It is contrasted by the secondary labor market, which usually consists of low-wage paying jobs, limited mobility within jobs, and temporary careers. The primary and secondary labor markets are intended for division of the standard of jobs within labor (heavy work) services.

The workforce as a whole in a primary market is motivated to serve their employer because of health benefits, insurance policies, pension wages and job security. The job market here consists mainly of white- and blue-collar jobs. In the primary labor market, the employees are always trying to prove themselves to their employers by portraying their skills and educational credentials.

== See also ==
- Dual labour market
- Labor market segmentation
- Secondary labor market
- White-collar worker
