= Coorie =

Scots word

Coorie is a Scots word meaning "to stoop, bend, cringe, crouch for protection" and "to snuggle, nestle." It has been positioned as a "lifestyle trend," similar to the Scandinavian concept of hygge, which involves ideas such as cosiness.

In 2017, the Scottish tourist authority promoted còsagach – a Gaelic word which they suggested meant "snug, sheltered or cosy" but which can also mean a damp, mossy nook or cranny. The best-selling book The Art of Coorie in 2018 suggested that coorie is a well-established concept involving hearty Scottish cuisine, such as Cullen skink, and invigorating outdoor activities such as swimming in lochs.
