= Zhifan =

Zhifan can be a transliteration of several Chinese given names. Notable people with the name include:

- An Zhifan (Chinese: 安志藩; 1911–2011), Chinese politician
- Cheng Zhifan (Chinese: 成之凡; 1927–2021), Chinese-French musician
- Wu Zhifan (born 2001), Chinese mountain biker
- Zhu Zhifan (Chinese: 朱寘鐇; died 1511), Ming dynasty prince
