= Jinsha =

Jinsha may refer to:

== Mainland China (PRC) ==
- Jinsha River (金沙江), westernmost of the major headwater streams of the Yangtze
- Jinsha site (金沙), in Chengdu
- Jinsha County (金沙县), Guizhou
- Jin Sha Blog, a website about the Chinese luxury travel market

Towns (金沙鎮)

- Jinsha, Anhui, in Jixi County, Anhui
- Jinsha, Fujian, in Minqing County, Fujian
- Jinsha, Jiangsu, in Tongzhou District, Nantong, Jiangsu

== Taiwan (Republic of China) ==
- Jinsha, Kinmen, in Kinmen County, Fujian

== See also ==
- Jin Sha (disambiguation)
