= Edna Bonacich =

American sociologist

- Born: 1940; Connecticut, U.S.

Academic background
- Education: University of Natal (BSS, 1961) Harvard University (MA, 1966; PhD, 1969)

Academic work
- Discipline: Sociology
- Institutions: University of California, Riverside (Professor Emeritus)
- Main interests: Race and labor, social inequality
- Notable ideas: Split labor market theory Middleman minority

Edna Bonacich is an American sociologist. She is Professor Emeritus of Sociology and Ethnic Studies at the University of California, Riverside.

Bonacich is credited as the originator of the Split labor market theory and a significant contributor to the theory of the Middleman minority.

== Books ==
- with Richard P. Appelbaum. Behind the Label: Inequality in the Los Angeles Apparel Industry (University of California Press, 2000)
- with Lucie Cheng. Labor Immigration Under Capitalism: Asian Workers in the U.S. Before World War II (University of California Press, 1984)
- with Ivan Light. Immigrant Entrepreneurs: Koreans in Los Angeles, 1965–1982 (University of California Press, 1988)
- with John Modell. The Economic Basis of Ethnic Solidarity: Small Business in the Japanese American Community (University of California Press, 1980)
