= Geographic mobility =

Measure of how populations and goods move over time

Geographic mobility is the measure of how populations and goods move over time. Geographic mobility, population mobility, or more simply mobility is also a statistic that measures migration within a population. Commonly used in demography and human geography, it may also be used to describe the movement of animals between populations. These moves can be as large scale as international migrations or as small as regional commuting arrangements. Geographic mobility has a large impact on many sociological factors in a community and is a current topic of academic research. It varies between different regions depending on both formal policies and established social norms, and has different effects and responses in different societies. Population mobility has implications ranging from administrative changes in government and impacts on local economic growth to housing markets and demand for regional services.

== Measurement ==
National geographic mobility data is available from census and public government records in the United States, the European Union, China and many other countries. International mobility data is available from tourism statistics and transportation carriers information. On the basis of these sources, the Global Transnational Mobility Dataset offers estimates of the number of people moving country-to-country on a yearly basis. .

=== United States ===
Mobility estimates in the Current Population Survey (CPS), produced by the United States Census Bureau, define mobility status on the basis of a comparison between the place of residence of each individual to the time of the March survey and the place of residence one year earlier. Non-movers are all people who were living in the same house at the end of the migration period and the beginning of the migration period. Movers are all people who were living in a different house at the end of the period rather than at the beginning. They are further classified as to whether they were living in the same or different county, state, region, or were movers from abroad. Movers are also categorized by whether they moved within or between central cities, suburbs, and non-metropolitan areas of the United States.

The CPS includes information on reasons for a move. These include work-related factors, such as a job transfer, job loss or looking for work, and wanting to be closer to work. Housing factors include wanting to own a home, rather than rent, seeking a better home or better neighborhood, or wanting cheaper housing. Additional mobility factors include attending college, changes in marital status, retirement, or health-related moves.

=== European Union ===
The Eurobarometer survey measures mobility in a similar manner to the US census. Direct comparison of the two is difficult due to social constraints of traveling between countries in the European Union not encountered with interstate travel within the United States. Differences include language barriers, cultural resistance, and the added hurdle of international labour laws.

=== China ===
Several scholarly surveys have been conducted to measure geographic mobility in China, but no single comprehensive census is available. Since the year 2000 the National Bureau of Statistics of China has added migrant worker estimates to their annual household survey. The Chinese Development Research Center of the State Council also undertook a study in 2010 characterizing the scope of migration for work and relevant statistics of that population. The survey measured demographics such as age, education level, job type, income, expenses, housing, and leisure activities.

=== Other measures ===
Population turnover is a related statistic that measures gross moves in relation to the size of the population, for example movement of residents into and out of a geographic location between census counts.

== Influencing factors ==
=== Economic reasons ===
Most theoretical models attribute the desire to relocate to the impact of wages and salary and employment on personal expected earnings. The prospect of gainful employment in another region leads to movement to capitalize on new opportunities and resources unavailable in the original community. Perceptions, gaps in prospective incomes, availability of accurate information, and geographic distance all play a part in the decision to migrate. Studies have shown that unemployment rates statistically correlate to measured migrations in the EU (a relatively mobile society). Further, there is evidence that comparable statistical results can be obtained using labor availability interchangeably with population migration data.

Surveys show potential movers also face anxiety about the prospects of actually finding a suitable job in their new location. The capacity to migrate depends on current income or access to credit to support the move, and is always up to chance. Economists have shown that the decline in home values in the US in the late 2000s diminished state-to-state migration, with roughly 110,000 to 150,000 fewer individuals migrating across state lines in any given year. Socialized unemployment insurance programs help to increase individual liquidity and lessen the burden of search costs and movement risk. Research has shown that overall the presence of social insurance does not have a strong effect on the rate of personal movement because while it lowers relative movement costs, it also increases the opportunity costs of movement.

Current international laws present challenges to ideal geographic mobility. Migrants must have a physical means (legal or illegal) over which to travel to a new country. An increase in individual income was shown to increase access to long distance transportation and enable individuals more freedom of travel. Seeking a job in another country often requires sponsorship, visas, or may not even be possible in a given situation. Government support is in no way guaranteed for international geographic mobility. Existing language and cultural barriers also severely hamper geographic mobility on both regional and national levels.

=== Personal preferences ===
Personal preference factors besides economic logic can exert a strong influence on an individual's geographic mobility. Concerns such as climate, the strength of regional housing markets, cultural comfort, family, and local social capital all play into the decision to move or not. Individualization of the job market in industrializing countries has led to an increased preference among workers to follow market opportunities. Media driven self-awareness and highly individualistic symbolism exported from the western world have allowed people to imagine themselves living completely different lifestyles. Western media glamorizes the image of the self-sufficient youth, showing examples of both men and women who lead strong, individualistic, empowered lifestyles. Globalization has destabilized previously immutable social institutions, shifting cultural value away from old traditions to new more individualistic and market friendly ideas. This combined with a privatization and individualization of labor has in many ways made fluidity more the norm than structure.

The availability of geographic mobility can also directly affect an individual's self-empowerment. Large numbers of women in South Korea, Japan, and China are taking advantage of newly available travel opportunities: experiencing life overseas and touring or studying. In South Korea progressive educational reforms have led to large numbers of women receiving higher level degrees, but structural inequality in the job market makes it difficult for them to get middle or upper class jobs. 93% of women graduate from high school and 63% from college, but only 46.7% of college grads are employed. Further, those employed women suffer from a 76% wage differential compared to like qualified men. Japan has similar structural issues where half of the employed women in the country only work part-time. Geographic relocation presents social opportunities to both seek a more favorable job climate and a social order more accepting of educated women. The prospect of greater control over their own lives and careers draws many of these young women to build their futures away from their immediate surroundings: 80% of Japanese people studying abroad are women.

=== Social forces ===
Social forces can also foster individual geographic mobility. Support from the community can increase the probability of relocation—it has been shown that the chances of migration in India improve when groups of houses from the same sub-caste all decide to move together. Worldly exposure also increase one's tendency to be mobile. Public health studies measured higher geographic mobility among female sex workers who: drank, had experienced violence, had worked for more than four years, and had a regular non-paying partner than those who did not. American World War II veterans, who had traveled to distant continents and then returned, were more willing to relocate for jobs than the previous generation of Americans.

Demographically, research shows that one's level of education tends to correlate to higher mobility, especially among university graduates. Youth and a lack of a family or children correlate to increased mobility too, with the peak in mobility occurring in the mid to late 20s for populations surveyed in Europe.

== Economic effects ==
=== Labor supply ===
Geographical mobility of labor allows the labor supply to respond to regional disparities, limiting economic inefficiencies. Low labor mobility quickly leads to inequality between static economic regions and a misappropriation of labor resources. Geographic mobility can help alleviate asymmetric shocks between regions with diversified economies, like in the European Union. A mobile population allows a region to shed workers when jobs are scarce and gives those workers the opportunity seek employment elsewhere where opportunities might be better. While an increase in geographic mobility increases overall economic efficiency, the increased competition for jobs on the local level in otherwise prosperous regions could lead to higher unemployment than before the migration.

Female labor supply rates actually have larger statistical effect on mobility than male rates. Traditionally male jobs in the developing world have much more inelastic demand than female ones, so the variations in the female rate lead to more drastic changes in employment that more strongly affect mobility.

=== Resource allocation ===
Labor mobility theoretically leads to a more balanced and economically efficient distribution of jobs and resources overall. Individual employees can better match their skills to potential jobs on the open job market. They can seek out ideal jobs instead of artificially limiting themselves to their geographic areas. The opportunity to study abroad is a major vehicle of entry to western countries for Asian women. Moving to the West to study is a common career move for Asian women in their 20s, allowing them to abandon the traditional marriage track and pursue economic ventures outside the home.

On the other hand, mobility can also have negative consequences on a region facing widespread emigration. Brain drain and labor resource diminishment make it more difficult for troubled regions to recover after an economic stumble. Additional people migrating into a region can also place extra stress on existing social infrastructure for services like healthcare, welfare, and unemployment.

=== Remittances ===
Geographic mobility allows for remittances from distant family members back to support local needs. Loans and transfers can flow back from migrated members of a community to sustain those who remain behind. Remittances are one of the primary benefits of migration to the country of origin, not only substantially enhancing local family income but also spilling over into benefits of increased capital flow in the entire local economy. Remittances play a large role in sustaining the economies of many developing nations, for example bringing over US$1bn into the Philippines every month and eclipsing the entire tourism profit of Morocco.

== Female mobility ==
=== Empowerment ===
With heightened self-awareness, educated women hope to grasp opportunities from moving, leading to increased female individualization and empowerment. Given access to travel, international education provides one of few avenues for women in China to live non-traditional personally emancipated lives. In Japan geographic mobility offers an opportunity to gain real job experience and advance a career too. Japanese society places a significant social pressure on women to get married, but many young women feel the need to "escape" and can find their independent selves in another setting.

Many migrants do choose to continue to benefit and rely on older home ties though. These women cannot change behavior too much from social norms or risk being cut off. Studies show that household choices in India are affected by distance from the ancestral home, especially within the caste system.

There are also other new risks for women in new locations. Female sex workers have statistically higher sexually transmitted diseases and HIV rates when more mobile. There is also potential for male backlash in a new setting. Domestic violence can be sparked by power struggles when newly empowered women regain some control traditionally held by men.

=== Participation ===
Female labor participation is vital to improving regional disparities in a competitive world and will increase in value over time. Women's participation and creative energy is vital for the success of economies on a global scale. Female labor participation can act as a substitute for more generalized labor mobility too. In the European Union women provide a dynamic substitute for male labor with fluctuations in the economy. This allows for more geographic stability while maintaining the variability of a flexible labor economy. When families do migrate, woman often get employed first and become the breadwinner for the home. Even if this only lasts for a duration of time, the experience is empowering and helps shape social dynamics within the home.

Often a relocation is primarily motivated by lack of any better opportunities in their prior situation though. Many of the women go through the trial of moving and starting over due to economic and social circumstances outside of her control. Research also seems to indicate that women and minorities migrating into a new area often act as economic substitutes for local minorities rather than paving their own new ground. Female income effects from migration will only kick in if there are sufficient differences between males and females too, so long term changes will likely not happen quickly.

=== Transportation access ===
Women have traditionally had more limited access to improved means of personal transportation and thus had more limited local mobility. Women surveyed in England were less likely overall than men to have drivers licenses and took longer to get to key destinations. Women often seek work closer to home compared to men, taking jobs in a more geographically confined area and relying more on non-automobile transportation. Access to personal transportation can improve women's choice of feasible destinations and decrease average trip time.

== Effects on children, family, and education ==
Increased geographic mobility can offer new opportunities to previously isolated groups. In India, increasing mobility allows families the chance to strengthen family ties by sending children to traditional homes or expand educational opportunities with options to attend urban schools. Additional economic freedom bolstered by additional capital from remittances can allow children to stay in school longer without having to worry about supporting the core family.

Increased geographic mobility and long distance moves do place strains on the household and family. The loss of established strong ties decreases social support and can lower productivity, especially among adolescents. Geographic isolation from previous relationships increases personal dependence on the nuclear family unit and can lead to power unbalances within the household.

Migration for work allows the migrants themselves to develop new skills and receive new technical training abroad. Migrants surveyed in Australia and the US have lower rates of continual training than their native born peers as a whole, but are likely to continue gaining technical skills after establishing an initial technical aptitude. The appeal of new educational opportunities to migrants also loses appeal with age; older movers see less of an incentive to spend time to improve upon their existing skills.

Increased global mobility has helped to destabilize the prospects of young people looking for reliable work and led to a greater assumption of risk on behalf of young people. Coping strategies push them to put off long-term commitments, decreasing the formation of families and lowering birth rates. Labor market volatility increases the dangers of settling down since incomes are cannot be relied upon long term. Women in the workplace also face more disincentives to having children since they could be more easily replaced if forced to leave their job temporarily.

== Effects on culture ==
=== Cultural exchange ===
Increased geographic mobility increases the depth and quality of cultural exchange between communities. Travel and cooperation bring people together across cultural divides and facilitate the trade of customs and ideas. New community members bring unique talents and skills that can improve overall services and bring additional opportunity to an area. Additional population "churn" can also increase diversity and lower tensions that would arise otherwise with large concentrations of particular demographic groups. On the other hand, accelerated cultural exchange can dilute existing customs and cause social friction between competing immigrating populations too. Residents in communities with a large percentage of highly mobile occupants also worry about long term social cohesion. Rapid turnover can lead to cultural isolation and sometimes prevents neighbors from building close cohesive relationships.

=== Social networks ===
Increasing long range personal mobility tends to lead to geographic expansion of an individual's support network. Long-distance connections require more time to visit and minimizes the occurrence of unplanned social interaction. Increased mobility can decrease an individual's attachment to a local community and weaken local support networks. People often turn to information technology to maintain connections across distance, strengthening distance relationships and allowing people to pursue career opportunities despite geographic distance from a partner.

=== Effects on Culture and Community ===
Social psychologists have looked at differences between areas that have higher rates of residential mobility versus lower rates. Areas with higher rates of residential mobility tend to have lower rates of pro-community actions, such as purchasing special license plates to support local initiatives. Researchers also brought participants to the laboratory to play a series of games either in stable groups or groups that changed each round. At the end of the experiment, participants in the stable groups were more likely to help a team member who pretended to need help with a trivia question.

People in communities with higher rates of residential mobility and individuals who have moved more in their lives tend to be more individualistic. In the laboratory, participants asked to imagine moving in the future become more interested in expanding their social networks. However, mobility is linked to more low-commitment groups. For example, college students who had moved more times in their life tended to join college clubs that required less commitment than students who had moved less before college. These studies suggest that residential mobility is linked to a broader-but-shallower socialization style.

== See also ==
- Activity space
- Human migration
- Circular migration
- Labor mobility
- Freedom of movement
- Migrant worker
