= Primary deviance =

Primary deviance is the initial stage in defining deviant behavior. Prominent sociologist Edwin Lemert conceptualized primary deviance as engaging in the initial act of deviance. This is very common throughout society, as everyone takes part in basic form violations. Primary deviance does not result in a person internalizing a deviant identity, so one does not alter their self-concept to include this deviant identity. It is not until the act becomes labeled or tagged, that secondary deviation may materialize. According to Lemert, primary deviance is the acts that are carried out by the individual that allows them to carry the deviant label.

== Influences on primary deviant behavior ==
=== Family and home life ===
Parental support and the influence that parents have on their children is one of the highest contributors to the behaviors in adolescents. This is the primary stage in which behaviors, morals and values are learned and adopted. The guidance from parents is intended to mold and shape the behaviors that will qualify them to properly function in society. Praise, love, affection, encouragement and many other aspects of positive enforcement are some of the largest components of parental support. However, this is not all it takes to prevent deviant behaviors from forming and occurring. Parents must enforce "effective discipline, monitoring, and problem-solving techniques." Children who come from homes where parents do not enforce positive behaviors and do not punish deviant behaviors appropriately, are children who are likely to engage in deviant behaviors. This type of bond is considered weak and cause the child to act out and become deviant."

=== Peers ===
Strong parental bonds are essential to the social group that the child will choose to associate with. When there is little to no control in the home, no positive enforcement from parents, and the child does not have positive feelings towards schooling and education; they are more likely to associate with deviant peers. When associating with deviant peers, they are more accepting of deviant behaviors than if they chose another social group. This is why it is vital that the parent-child bond be strong because it will have an ultimate influence on the peers they choose and will have an influence on if they choose to engage in primary deviant behaviors as juveniles.

== Sociological contributors ==
=== Frank Tannenbaum ===
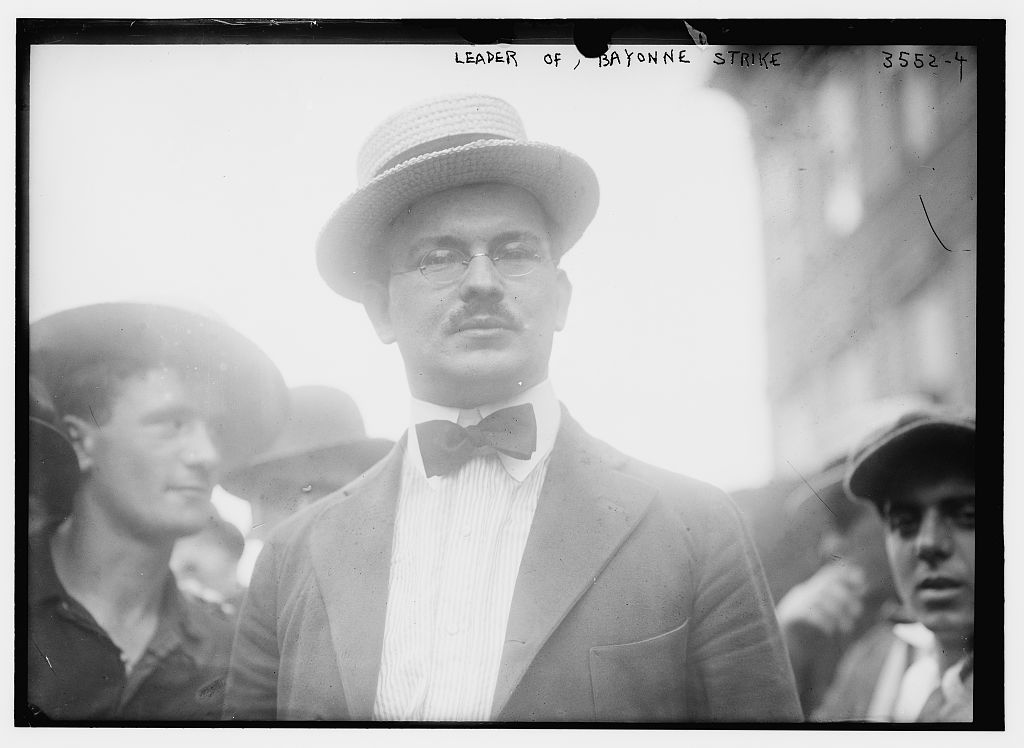
Frank Tannenbaum

Frank Tannenbaum theorized that primary deviant behaviors may be innocent or fun for those committing the acts, but can become a nuisance and viewed as some form of delinquency to their parents, educators and even those in law enforcement. Tannenbaum distinguished two different types of deviancy. The first one being the initial act which the child considers to be of innocence but are labeled as deviant by the adult, this label is called "primary deviancy". The second is after they have been initially labeled, that they graduate to secondary deviance, in which both the adult and child agree that they are a deviant. Tannenbaum stated that the "over dramatization" of these deviant acts can cause one to be labeled and accept the label of being a deviant. Due to them accepting this label, they will eventually graduate from being a primary deviant to a secondary deviant thus committing greater crimes.

== Theoretical approaches ==
=== Labeling Theory ===
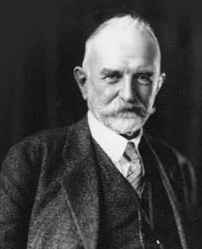
George Herbert Mead

The most prevalent theory as it relates to primary deviance was developed in the early 1960s by a group of sociologists and was titled "labeling theory". The labeling theory is a variant of symbolic interactionism. Symbolic interactionism is "a theoretical approach in sociology developed by George Herbert Mead. It emphasizes the roles of symbols and language as core elements of human interaction. Labeling theory according, to labeling theorists, is applied by those put in place to keep law and order, such as police officers, judges; etc. Those are the people who typically label the people who have violated some law or another. The label "deviant" does not come from the person who has committed the act, but someone who is more powerful than the person being labeled. This theory has been tremendously criticized for not being able to explain what causes deviance early on. However, the labeling theory's main focus is to explain how labeling relates and can cause secondary deviance.

=== Anomie theory ===
Robert Merton developed the anomie theory which was dedicated specifically to the causes of deviance. The word anomie was derived from the "Godfather of Sociology" Emile Durkheim. Anomie is "the breakdown of social norms that results from society's urging people to be ambitious but failing to provide them with legitimate opportunities to succeed". Merton theorized that society places substantial emphasis on the importance of achieving success. However, this goal is not attainable for people of all social classes. Due to the absence of resources for people of lower social classes to achieve a great level of success, Merton theorized that people are forced to commit deviant acts. Merton has labeled the deviants behavior's as innovation.

=== Social learning theory ===
The social learning theory theorizes that deviant behavior is learned through social interactions with other people. Edwin Sutherland developed an explanation for this theory which explains how one learns deviant behavior. This explanation is called differential association.

=== Differential association ===
Differential association theorizes that "If an individual associates with people who hold deviant ideas more than with people who embrace conventional ideas, the individual is likely to become deviant." The person that is presenting the deviant act is not always necessarily the deviant. The emphasis of differential association is that if someone is presented with the opportunity they will likely commit the act. Although someone may associate with both deviants and those who hold conventional ideas, if the deviant contacts outweigh the conventional contacts then deviancy is likely to occur. Differential Association's main key point refers particularly to the association aspect. Differential Association is theorized to be "the cause of deviance".

== Example of primary deviance ==
=== Charles Manson ===
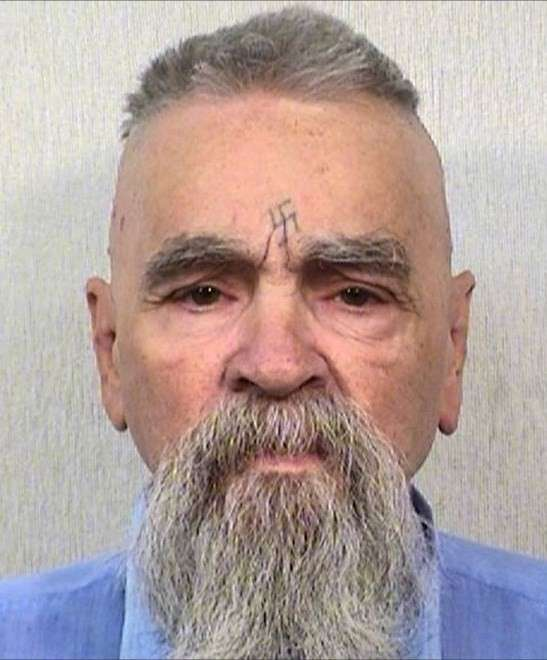
Charles Miles Manson

One person who was labeled as deviant was the infamous murderer Charles Manson. Manson was born to a 16 year old Kathleen Maddox on November 12, 1934, in Cincinnati, Ohio. Manson's Father, Colonel Scott left Manson's mother to raise him alone. When Charles was seven years old, he was sent to live with his aunt and uncle in McMechen, West Virginia, after his mother was sentenced to five years in prison for armed robbery. Living with his aunt and uncle, Manson was given a more stable life that could allow him to be a positive contributor to society. However, the absence of his mother and the yearning he had for that motherly love and affection caused Manson to indulge in primary deviant behavior at a young age, which ultimately manifested into secondary deviance as he became older.

Following the counsel of another uncle, a "mountain man" who lived in the mountains of Kentucky, Manson labeled himself a rebel. Manson's first act of deviancy began at the age of 9 years old when he set his school on fire and was sent to reform school. Throughout his adolescent, Manson was sent to several reform schools in hopes of rehabilitating him. Between 1942 and 1947 after her release from prison, Manson's mother was unable to properly care for him and was unsuccessful in finding him a foster home. She turned him over to the courts and allowed them to place him in an all boys school called Gibault School for Boys. Ten months later, Manson ran away from the Gibault School for Boys in hopes of rekindling a relationship he had longed for with his mother. After she rejected him Manson turned to a life of deviancy. Manson thrived off of high-consensus deviant acts such as burglary and theft. Manson was then sent to Father Flanagan's Boys' Home in 1949. After 4 days at Father Flanagan's Boys' Home, Manson ran away and pursued other deviant acts; such as auto theft, burglary, and armed robbery. Manson ran away 18 times from the National Training School for Boys where he alleged he was molested and beaten. This behavior in Manson's early years, caused this label of deviant to shadow him through his adult life, where he eventually graduated to Secondary deviance and eventually led the dangerous cult The Manson Family.
