= Edwin Lemert =

American sociologist

- Born: Edwin McCarthy Lemert; May 8, 1912; Ohio, US
- Died: November 10, 1996 (aged 84)
- Occupation: Sociologist

Edwin M. Lemert (May 8, 1912 – November 10, 1996) was a sociology professor at the University of California, Davis.

Lemert was born in Cincinnati, Ohio. He acquired his bachelor's degree in sociology from Miami University (class of 1934) and his doctorate from Ohio State University (class of 1939). He distinctly specialized in sociology and anthropology. For a short period of time he became a professor at Kent State and at Western Michigan Universities.

Even with all of the other sociologists back then, Lemert was able to view how most of the social acts are viewed as deviant acts. While studying drug addiction, he admired a powerful force at work. Beside the physical changes due to the addiction and all of the economic issues it can cause, there was an immense process of learning one's identity and justifying every action, "I do these things because I am this way."

Activities such as drinking and/or shoplifting do not reflect on an individual's personality. Lemert once wrote: "His acts are repeated and organized subjectively and transformed into active roles and become the social criteria for assigning status.....When a person begins to employ his deviant behavior or a role based on it as a means of defense, attack, or adjustment to the overt and covert problems created by the consequent societal reaction to him, his deviation is secondary".

== See also ==
- Interactionism
- Labelling theory
- Primary Deviance
- Secondary deviance
- Deviance (sociology)
