= Cheng Zhifan =

Chinese-French musician (1927–2021)

- 成之凡
- Born: 27 June 1927; Nanjing, China
- Died: 1 February 2021 (aged 93); Rambouillet, France
- Education: Shanghai Academy of Music
- Occupations: Musician, painter, collector, political activist
- Years active: 1951–present
- Notable work: Music of the Tao
- Spouse: Philippe Bertrand
- Parent(s): Cheng Shewo; Yang Fan
- Relatives: Cheng Youshu (sister); Cheng Siwei (brother); Lucie Cheng (half-sister)

Cheng Zhifan (Chinese: 成之凡; pinyin: Chéng Zhīfán; 27 June 1927 – 1 February 2021) was a Chinese-French musician, painter, collector, and political activist. She has run for the President of France three times. She has held a number of personal exhibitions in Paris. Her works are collected in the Paris Oriental Museum and the Musée d'Art Moderne de la Ville de Paris.

== Biography ==
Cheng was born in Beijing in 1927, to Cheng Shewo (1898–1991), a journalist, publisher, and educator, and Yang Fan (杨璠). She has an older sister, Cheng Youshu (1924–2021), a diplomat and poet, and a younger brother, Cheng Siwei (1935–2015), an economist, chemical engineer, and politician.

At the age of 11, Cheng was accepted to Shanghai Academy of Music; after graduation, she taught at the Shanghai Conservatory of Music.

In 1947, Cheng moved to Hong Kong and taught at Hong Kong School of Sacred Music. In May 1951, the French pianist Germaine Mounier visited China and took her as an apprentice; in November, the pianist took her to Paris. In 1953, she married Philippe Bertrand (贝尔覃) in a Christian church.

In April 1973, Cheng founded the French Taoist Association and served as its president.

In October 1981, Cheng ran for the President of France for the first time but was unsuccessful. In 1988, she ran for the office for the second time and failed again. She ran for the third time in 1995, but the French Interior Department has no proof of her participation in the presidential election. Zhifan died on 1 February, 2021, at the age of 93.

== Award ==
- 1995 Silver Medal for Paris Artists
