= Yeh Ming-hsun =

Chinese journalist and newspaper editor (1913–2009)

- Born: 25 September 1913
- Died: 21 November 2009 (aged 96); Taiwan
- Occupation: Journalist
- Employer: Chunghwa Daily

Yeh Ming-hsun
- Traditional Chinese: 葉明勳
- Simplified Chinese: 叶明勋
Transcriptions
Standard Mandarin
- Hanyu Pinyin: Yè Míngxūn
- Wade–Giles: Yeh Ming-hsün

Yeh Ming-hsun (25 September 1913 – 21 November 2009), was a Chinese journalist and newspaper editor. A native of Fujian Province, he became president of Chunghwa Daily, a newspaper belonging to the ruling Kuomintang, in 1950. In the late 1950s, Cheng Shewo and Yeh co-founded the Shih Hsin School of Journalism (now Shih Hsin University). Yeh served as the school's vice president in 1966 and its chairman from 1991 to 2006.

Yeh died in Taiwan on 21 November 2009. At his funeral, President Ma Ying-jeou presented a state citation.
