= Hubert M. Blalock Jr. =

American sociologist

- Awards: Paul F. Lazarsfeld Memorial Award

Academic background
- Education: University of North Carolina at Chapel Hill

Academic work
- Discipline: Sociology
- Institutions: University of North Carolina at Chapel Hill; University of Washington
- Notable ideas: Middleman minority

Hubert Morse Blalock Jr. (August 23, 1926 – February 8, 1991) was an American sociologist noted for his work on statistical research methods. He was a professor of sociology at the University of Washington, president of the American Sociological Association and a member of the National Academy of Sciences. According to the National Academies Press, Hubert Blalock "played a major role in shaping the field of sociology during the latter half of the twentieth century".

== Personal life ==
He married Ann Bonar and had three children, Susan, Kathleen, and James.

== Awards and Distinctions ==
- the Stouffer Award, presented by the American Sociological Association - 1973
- fellow of the American Statistical Association - 1974
- fellow of the American Academy of Arts and Sciences - 1975
- elected to the National Academy of Sciences - 1976
- president of the American Sociological Association in 1978–1979

== Notable works ==
- textbook Social Statistics (McGraw-Hill Kogakusha Ltd., Tokyo 1960 and 1972)
