= Split labor market theory =

Split labor market theory was proposed by sociologist Edna Bonacich in the early 1970s as an attempt to explain racial/ethnic tensions and labor market segmentation by race/ethnicity in terms of social structure and political power rather than individual-level prejudice. Bonacich argues that ethnic antagonism emerges from a split labor market, where two or more racially/ethnically distinct groups of workers vie for the same jobs, and where the total cost to the employer (including wages) of hiring workers from one group is significantly lower than the cost of hiring from the other group. Employers (or capitalists) prefer to hire cheaper workers and will do so absent active opposition from higher-priced workers, creating an antagonism between higher- and lower-priced groups. Differences in the price of labor are sociological and political in nature, not a matter of personal preference, so that, e.g., native, unionized workers, who enjoy full political rights will demand higher wages and be more likely to resist employer prerogatives than undocumented immigrant, non-union workers from poorer countries. According to Bonacich, likely outcomes of a split labor market include not only antagonism but, depending on the political power of higher-priced workers, a caste-like system where lower-priced workers are restricted to specific occupations, or total exclusion of the lower-priced group from the labor market.

== Dynamics of three labor groups ==
Conflict develops between these three classes because each has a different interest.

Business or employers (capitalists) aim to have a cheap and docile labor force in order to compete effectively with other businesses and maximize economic return. Business will dispense with and undercut the white working-class if they could, and have done so when they have the opportunity.

Higher paid labor, otherwise called the "primary labor market", is threatened by introduction of cheaper labor into their market fearing that it will force them to leave the workplace or reduce their pay level. If the Higher Paid Labor is strong enough or possess the power resources, they can prevent being replaced or undercut by cheaper labor through exclusion movements or creating caste systems (exclusiveness or aristocracy of labor).

Cheaper labor, also called the "secondary labor market", is used by the employer to undermine the position of more expensive labor through strikebreaking and undercutting. Cheaper laborers are usually unskilled, but can be trained.

== Economics of discrimination ==
The split labor market theory attributes events to social structure rather than to individual preferences. It is a form of conflict theory in that it sees discrimination as a result of the conflict between competing interest groups. "The business owner or capitalist recognizes that racial discrimination is dysfunctional for the business enterprise and prefers not to discriminate. The objective of the capitalist is to get the best worker for the cheapest wage, and it is therefore in the capitalist's interest not to discriminate, because discrimination limits the pool of workers available for the position. Accordingly, those doing the hiring discriminate not because they have a 'taste for discrimination', but rather because they might have been forced to do so by the laborers that do benefit" (Farley). Higher paid laborers may be able to impose a system of discrimination in a number of ways. Discrimination occurs in a split labor market because workers benefit when they eliminate minority competition.

== Ethnic antagonism in relation to split labor market ==
Ethnic antagonism is produced when competition arises from a price differential. A source of antagonism between ethnic groups is assumed to be a split labor market or one in which there is a large differential in price of labor for the same occupation/work. The price of labor is not a response to the race or ethnicity of those entering the labor market. A price differential results from differences in resources and motives which are often correlates of ethnicity.

== Conclusion ==
According to Bonacich, "The central hypothesis [deriving from split labor market theory] is that ethnic antagonism first germinates in a labor market split along racial lines". Split labor market theory traces the roots of racial/ethnic stratification to social and political differences that predate inter-group contact in the labor market, but the specific outcomes (caste system, exclusion, or something else) result mainly from the actions of the higher paid segment of the working class and their power relative to that of capital.

In one of the best-known applications of split labor market theory, William Julius Wilson argued in The Declining Significance of Race that a split labor market provided much of the racial antagonism between blacks and whites during the earlier years of what he called the period of industrial race relations. Wilson argued that this did not last, however, as "the passage of protective union legislation during the New Deal era, and the equal employment legislation in the early sixties have virtually eliminated the tendency of employers to create a split labor market in which black labor is deemed cheaper than white labor regardless of the work performed".

== See also ==
- Social stratification
