= Cheng Youshu =

Chinese diplomat and poet (1924–2021)

- 成幼殊
- Born: 1924; Beijing, China
- Died: 5 May 2021 (aged 96–97); Beijing, China
- Education: Saint John's University, Shanghai
- Occupations: Diplomat, poet
- Spouse: Chen Luzhi (m. 1948)
- Children: 4
- Relatives: Father: Cheng Shewo sister: Cheng Zhifan brother: Cheng Siwei half-sister: Lucie Cheng half-sister: Cheng Chia-lin
- Writing career
- Pen name: Jin Sha (金沙)
- Language: Chinese, English, Danish
- Period: 1937–2022
- Genre: Poetry
- Notable works: The Surviving Rice; Nb – Some Memories of Niels Henrik David Bohr
- Notable awards: The Surviving Rice; 2005 3rd Lu Xun Literary Prize

Cheng Youshu (Chinese: 成幼殊; pinyin: Chéng Yòushū; 1924 – 5 May 2021) was a Chinese diplomat and poet. Cheng was fluent in English and Danish.

== Biography ==
Cheng was born in Beijing in 1924, with her ancestral hometown in Xiangxiang, Hunan. Her father Cheng Shewo was a newspaperman. She is the second of five children. Her sister, Cheng Zhifan (Chinese: 成之凡) (born in 1928), is French Chinese. Her brother Cheng Siwei was a Chinese politician.

Cheng Youshu began writing poems at the age of 13. After high school, Cheng was accepted into Saint John's University, Shanghai, where she joined the Wenhui Fellowship—a Christian Fellowship.

In 1945, Cheng and her schoolmate founded the Yehuo Poetry Club (Chinese: 野火诗社). In May 1945, Cheng joined the Chinese Communist Party, and served in the New Fourth Army in Shanghai.

In 1948, Cheng went to Hong Kong to work as a reporter. While in Hong Kong, Cheng met her future husband, Chen Luzhi. Cheng married Chen (Chinese: 陈鲁直) in Hong Kong. They have four children.

In October 1949, Cheng moved in Guangzhou, her father went to Taiwan with Kuomintang.

After the founding of the Communist State, Cheng worked in the Chinese Foreign Ministry. From 1955 to 1961, Cheng worked in India as a diplomat. In 1984, Cheng went to Denmark with her husband when he served as China's Ambassador to Denmark.

Cheng died in Beijing on 5 May 2021.

== Works ==
=== Poems ===
- The Surviving Rice (Chinese: 幸存的一粟)

=== Translation ===
- Nb—Some Memories of Niels Henrik David Bohr (Chinese: NB—关于尼尔斯·波尔的一些回忆)

== Awards ==
- The Surviving Rice – 3rd Lu Xun Literary Prize (2005)
