= Ethnostatistics =

Study of the social activity of producing and using statistics

Ethnostatistics is the study of the social activity of producing and using statistics. The premise of the area of study is that statistics are themselves not neutral facts, but are themselves influenced by the social biases of the persons involved in their production. The concept was suggested in John Kitsuse or Aaron Cicourel in their 1962 article, "A Note on Official Statistics", published in Social Problems, where they suggested that "criminal statistics" are indicative of the social organization of the agencies responsible for assembling them. The concept was developed by sociologist Robert Gephart in his 1988 book, Ethnostatistics. The field of study "uses concepts from ethnomethodology to study sensemaking practices that social scientists employ in the production, interpretation, and display of statistics created in social research". As of the early 2000s, there were three "levels" of ethnostatistics, the first examining the social production of statistics, the second using computer simulations to examine the degree to which methods of gathering statistics may distort data, and third examining the persuasive effect of statistics on their end consumer.
