= Circular migration =

Temporary movement of a migrant worker

Total permanent and temporary net migration rates per 1,000 people

Circular migration or repeat migration is the temporary and usually repetitive movement of a migrant worker between home and host areas, typically for the purpose of employment. It represents an established pattern of population mobility, whether cross-country or rural-urban. There are several benefits associated with this migration pattern, including gains in financial capital, human capital, and social capital. There are also costs associated with circular migration, such as brain drain, poor working conditions, forced labor, and the inability to transfer acquired skills to home economies. Socially, there are strong connections to gender, health outcomes, development, poverty, and global immigration policy.

== Overview ==
=== Definition ===
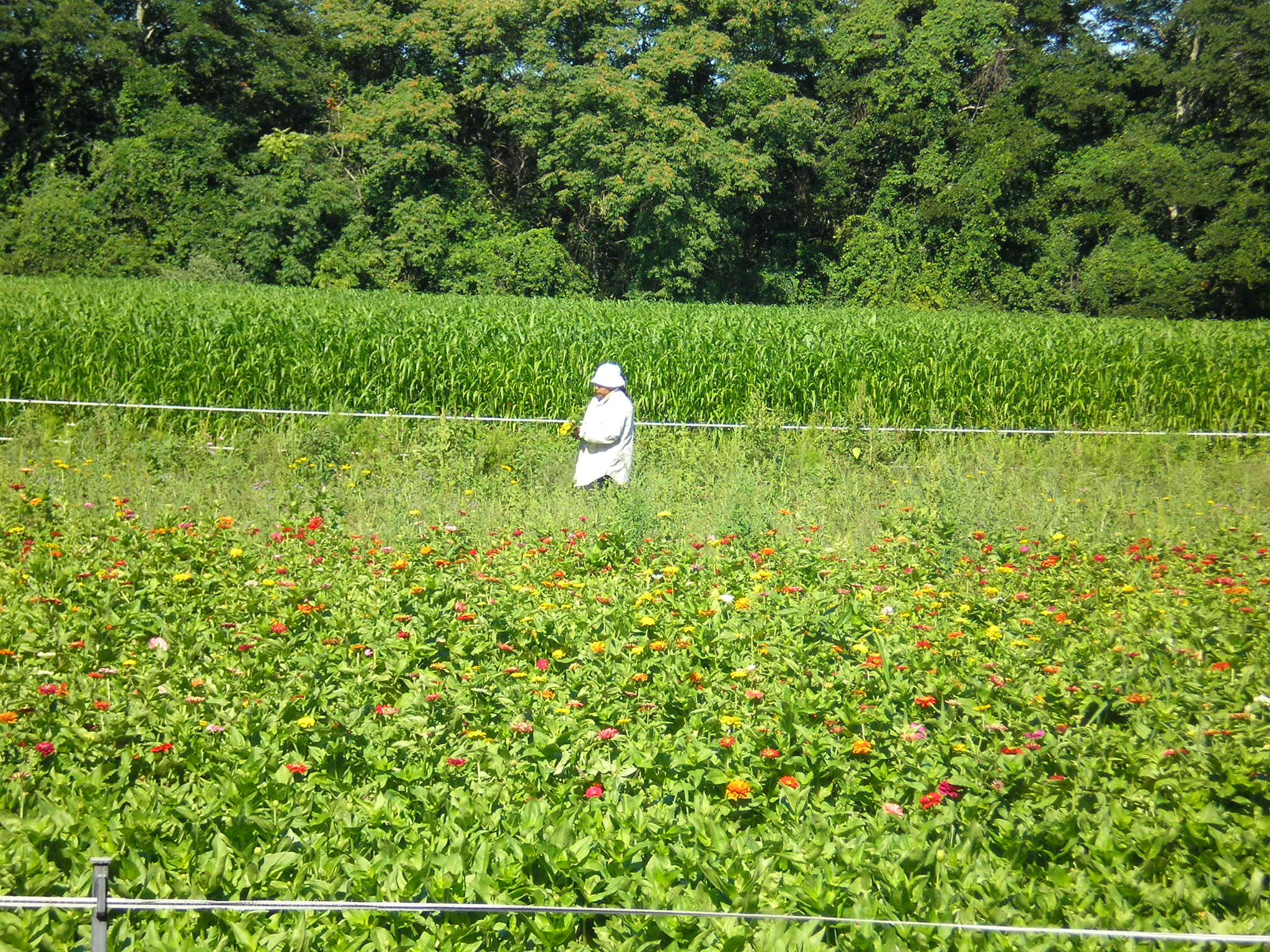
Migrant worker

The term "circular migration" describes the fluid movement of people between areas, usually for the purpose of employment. The term itself first came into use in the 1960s and 1970s, mostly related to urbanization, development, and internal migration. There are six criteria that define migration as being circular:

- Temporary
- Renewable
- Circulatory
- Legal
- Respectful of the migrants’ rights
- Managed so as to optimize labor markets for both origin and destination countries

Current migration policy rarely takes into account circular migration and instead mainly focuses on the dichotomous concepts of "permanent" and "temporary". In contrast to temporary migration, circular migration allows the worker to simultaneously be engaged with both the home and host countries. Furthermore, it typically involves both return to the country of origin and repeated moves to the destination country. In many ways, being connected to both places provides an advantage for the migrant worker, because they do not have to make a definitive choice to stay in one. This allows for the maximization of capabilities, a concept articulated by Amartya Sen and Martha Nussbaum. By working in a high-income location with better earnings and spending in low-income, low-cost countries, the migrant worker is able to realize the best capabilities for both themselves and their families. Circularity also allows for the maintenance of traditions, citizenship, and family, an important part of human capabilities.

The circular patterns of migration can be divided into several categories: seasonal migration, non-seasonal low-wage labor, and the movement of professionals, academics, and transnational entrepreneurs. Of these, seasonal migration is the most familiar between high-income and low-income countries. Although it is mostly related to the agricultural sector, in can also apply to other industries that vary by season, such as tourism, landscaping, and construction.

=== Determinants ===
Work is an important factor in determining the duration and frequency of the migration. The circular nature allows for a migrant worker to take advantage of employment opportunities in both the origin and destination countries, as they become available. The economy and job opportunities of the location of origin are often an important determinant of migration. In addition, circular migration is influenced by labor market segmentation, because the working populations in many high-income countries are less likely to be employed in low-wage and low-status jobs, instead leaving these positions to migrants. Employers often look for the cheapest labor in areas with little connection to the potential destination markets, and this expanding labor frontier is slowly linking the most rural of areas with urban centers. Furthermore, the variety of occupations in the international labor market has increased. For example, in many middle-income countries, migrants provide much of the labor in the agricultural, construction, and domestic service industries.

Several factors may determine the extent to which circular migration is impactful upon the return of the migrant. Firstly, the size of the returning population is important, as large numbers of migrants may form a critical mass necessary for true change to occur. Secondly, the duration of the absence of the migrants is influential, as too short of an absence brings little change and too long of an absence leads to difficulties in readjustment. Thirdly, it is important to consider social class, as the elite may have a greater impact than unskilled workers. Fourth, the extent to which the origin and destination areas are different can have an effect, as those who migrate to metropolitan areas will have a greater impact if returning to an urban rather than a rural area. Lastly, the quantity and quality of the skills that the migrant acquires while abroad can determine the impact of migration.

Not everyone is able to maintain transnational lives. Those who have secure residential status in both the home and the host countries can better travel between them without concern for legal status. In terms of who migrates, circular migrant workers are more likely to be male, have primary education, and come from more rural and less developed areas. Education, gender, age, and the reasons for return from the first migration all affect the choice of migration form. In addition, circular migration rates are high among the poor.

=== Promoting factors ===
There are several factors that promote circular migration. Modern forms of transport and communication, increased social networks, and the growth of international corporations all contribute to the growing phenomena. Advances in transportation have reduced the time and money necessary to travel between locations, making it easier for migrants to return home more frequently and in the case of an emergency. New methods of communication facilitate closer connections with the migrants’ homes than before. Border-crossing social networks are especially important to the success of migrants. Through these networks, migrants are able to help each other by providing information about where to go, the best way to get jobs, where to live, etc., helping them to overcome many of the costs and barriers of entry. Furthermore, through these social networks, workers are able to keep up with families, economic activities, political interests, and individual cultures. This also contributes to the self-perpetuating nature of circular migration. With each return visit, migrants learn more about work, housing, and the process of migration itself. These social relationships and experiences, referred to as "migration-specific capital", lower the risk and costs of moving and improve the changes of success.

== Benefits ==
=== Triple-win ===
The concept of circular migration has been described as a triple-win scenario, providing benefits for the host country, the home country, and the migrants themselves. Developed countries allow migrants to enter in order to fill labor shortages, but with the understanding that the settlement is not permanent, distinguishing it from immigration. Developing countries benefit in the sense that they are not truly losing their skilled migrants, as these workers will return after a period of time to continue working. The migrants themselves benefit through the skills they learn abroad, as well as their increase in wages. The form of benefits in this triple-win discourse often take three forms: financial capital, human capital, and social capital. Circularity is the most beneficial whenever migrants move voluntary between locations in the pursuit of different interests, as well as when migrants have positive experiences while abroad, including financial and educational success.

=== Financial capital ===
Financial capital is mostly earned through remittances. Remittances are the transnational exchange of funds earned by migrants working abroad. In recent years, they have become an important global economic resource. In the 1990s, the estimated value of remittances doubled to over $105 billion each year. The United Nations estimates that the annual figure is around $232 billion, but the unofficial flow is unknown; it is possible that more than half of the remittances earned go unrecorded each year. Remittances vary in the channels used to transfer money, the amount transferred, and the manner in which the money is invested, saved, and consumed. There is evidence that circular migrants are able to send back greater remittances than permanent migrants.

=== Human capital ===
Human capital mostly involves the flow of skilled labor. Host countries view the circular migration of highly skilled and educated migrants as positive, while low-skilled labor is often viewed more negatively. Circular migration also allows for the international mobility of labor for shortages in specific sectors in developed countries with the surpluses present in developing countries. The skills that workers acquire while abroad may then benefit the home country upon return. Origin countries seek to increase their access to the labor markets of wealthier countries in hopes of reducing unemployment, increasing remittances, and retaining access to skilled nationals who work abroad. The networks that these skilled laborers establish can greatly benefit the home country, contributing to the social capital. Social capital also involves social remittances, non-material entities such as ideas and practices learned.

While the loss of skilled labor represents a potential cost for countries of origin, it can also at times be beneficial. For instance, if there is no room in the economy of the home country to use the skilled labor, then it is better for the workers to migrate and send back remittances. When these remittances are greater than what the migrant would have made in the home country, it is also beneficial. Another example is when the migrants return with new skills, knowledge, and capacities. Lastly, the movement of skilled labor is beneficial for the country of origin when migrants forge strong economic connections between the home and host country.

== Costs ==
=== Brain drain ===
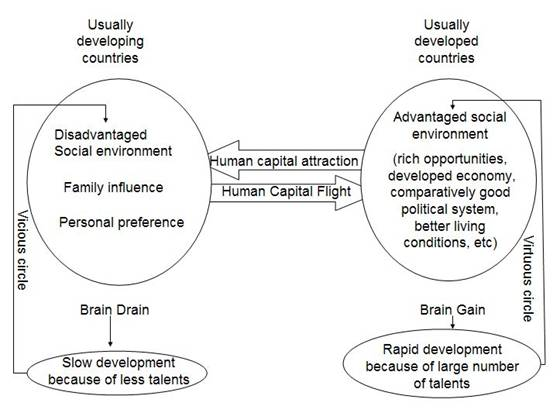
Diagram showing the process of brain drain

There are also several costs associated with circular migration. One of these is brain drain, where a migrant who migrates because of skills or education creates a loss of human resources in the country of origin. These highly skilled workers are in demand in the more developed countries, where in some areas the barriers to immigration have been reduced to allow for both permanent and temporary migration. At the same time, barriers against unskilled workers have been strengthened. The ability to use skills also varies and can constitute a cost to the migrant and the economy, If the migrants had unskilled jobs while working abroad, they will have little experience that will contribute to the development of their home country upon return. Additionally, even if the worker learned new technical or industrial skills, they may not be able to use them if their country of origin does not have the infrastructure or institutional framework to support them. Circular migration also has a social impact on the families of migrant workers. If labor migrants have children, these minors may be temporarily abandoned while their parents are abroad working. This issue is problematic and some authorities have begun to formulate policies to monitor the situation.

=== Freedom ===
Another issue to consider is the freedom of the migrants. Some scholars have questioned whether these workers are moving into a state of "unfreedom". Recruitment into circular migration may involve false promises and deception, leading to forced labor and debt bondage. Migrants have varying degrees of control concerning the choice and circumstances of migration, thus making the distinction between voluntary and forced migration unclear. Once in their destination country, migrants are sometimes met with abusive treatment, inadequate nutrition, poor lodging, and insufficient food. These factors are unlikely to bring a worker back to that area, thus discouraging circular migration. This dishonest recruitment leads to the question of whether the migrants are marginalized. Circular migrants are marginal in the area of destination in the sense that their true home is back in their home area, and they do not plan on living in the host area permanently.

=== Inequalities ===
Circular migration may also perpetuate existing inequalities. A worker's social class predicts the work that he or she will qualify for, and those who are most successful in their home country are most able to continue to be successful by improving the economic and social situation of their household. The optimistic "win-win-win" discourse can often overlook the many costs involved in circular migration, as well as the difficulty that exists in implementing policies specifically for circular migration.

=== Gender issues ===
Gender plays an important role in circular migration. In some countries such as Albania, women are significantly less likely to be migrants, particularly a circular migrant. Traditional gender roles often dictate that these women maintain childcare and household upkeep, while men are expected to be the primary sources of income. That said, there has mostly been an increase in the involvement of women in circular migration, such as through the increase in the number of female international students and those being recruited into high-skill executive and professional jobs. In many areas, though, women remain at the lower end of the labor market. For example, in Indonesia has a large degree of labor market segmentation, as women tend to work in domestic labor, factory work. Development in parts of the Middle East and Asia has created a demand for domestic workers, and institutions have been developed that recruit, train, send and place these workers. In countries like Indonesia, the number of women seeking to migrate as domestic workers is increasing exponentially despite cultural barriers and stories of exploitation, so the supply exists to meet the demand.

Policy and intervention programs may seek to increase the formal and informal protections for the women involved. More accurate information concerning the costs and benefits could also be provided to potential women migrant workers. Furthermore, women could also receive training that teaches them necessary skills while also empowering them to handle problems that arise. Lastly, effective and accessible help could be made available in areas of destination.

=== Health issues ===
Circular migration is also connected to health issues around the world. First, many circular migrants work in situations where they are more vulnerable to contracting sexually transmitted diseases (STDs). Several factors seem to create the perfect storm for the spread of diseases such as HIV. Many times, migrants are young, isolated, lonely, and have cash, which may lead them to sex and drugs. Evidence supports the idea that circular migrants become ill while working in urban areas and return home to die with their families. In addition to their personal elevated risk of contracting and dying from STDs, they are also at risk of spreading the diseases to their home communities upon return. Circular migrants make up a substantial proportion of those dying from HIV/TB, and that number continues to increase dramatically.

Circular migration has also been connected with the current spread of severe acute respiratory syndrome (SARS). This is partly because migrants can have a difficult time moving to new environments, as they lack the natives’ resistance to local diseases and infections. Many migrants are also at greater risk of becoming sick because of the marginal conditions in which they live. However, as described above, the majority of the attention has been on circular migrants as disease carriers. Contact with migrant workers places their rural partners at greater risk for acquiring STDs. Due to the nature of their work, circular migrants are gone from home often and for great lengths of time, which can disrupt the balance of their family and sex lives.

In addition to the possibility of single workers infecting partners in their home communities, migrant couples are also at a high risk of infection. In many cases, it was actually the female partner who stayed in the home community who was HIV-positive. Several possible policy interventions exist. First, employers in the area of destination should provide more family-friendly housing instead of single-sex hostels. Second, dealing with the more fundamental aspect of the issue, rural development should be encouraged. If the conditions in the home community were to be altered and improved, there would be less need for the men to seek temporary employment in urban areas in the first place.

== Case studies ==
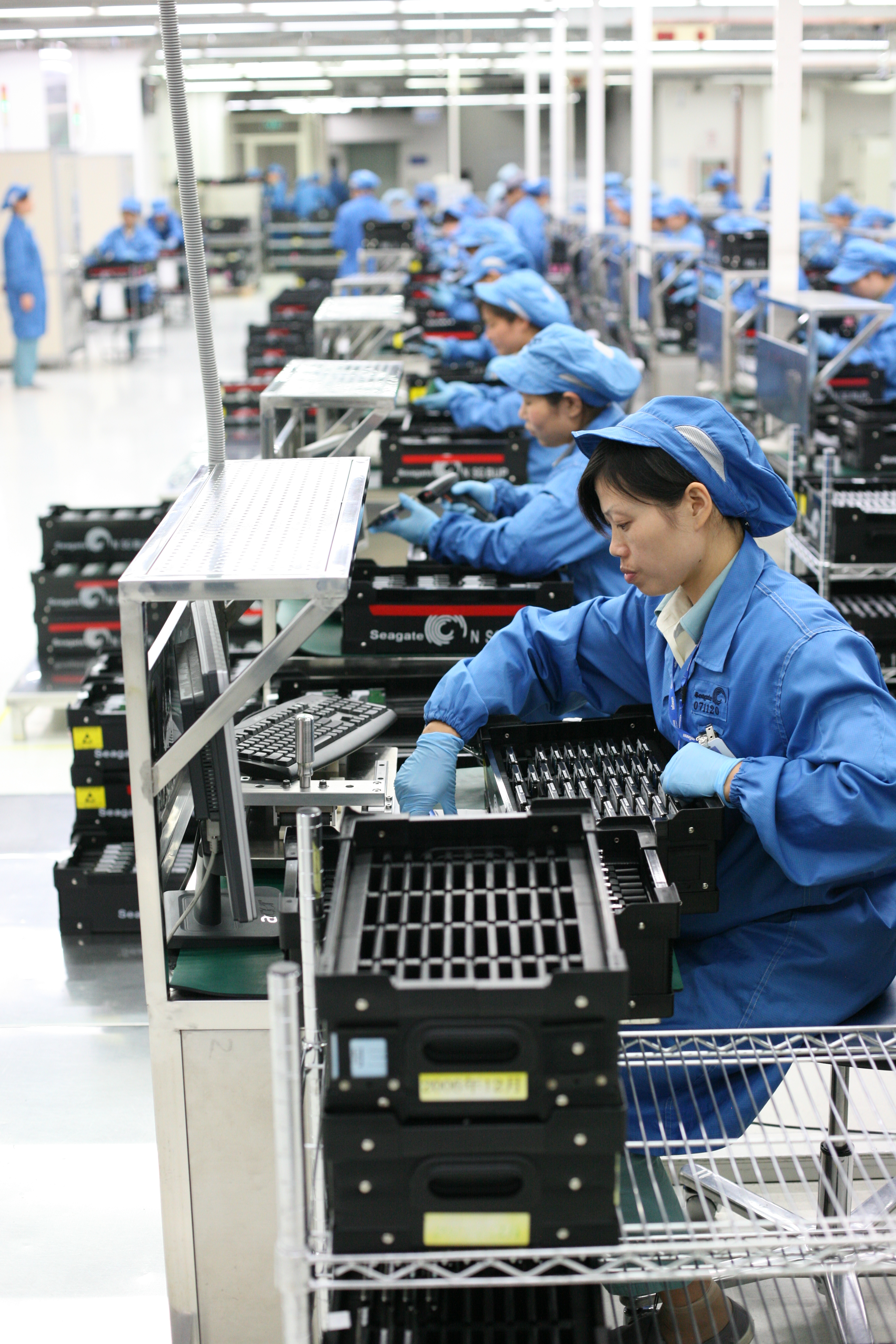
A glimpse into factory life for women in China. Several women sit in a row working at large machines.

=== China ===
The case of China provides one perspective on the rural-urban aspect of circular migration. Instead of traveling between countries, many circular migrants travel between their rural villages and urban centers. Legal restrictions and structural barriers prevent permanent settlement in their host destinations, forcing the workers to return home. Women in particular have begun to migrate from rural to urban areas as economic growth in China widens the cultural gap between the two areas. Urban areas offer a wide range of jobs to choose from, including domestic and factory work, working as a hostess in one of China's popular karaoke bars or even owning one's own business. These migrant women are often empowered by the greater freedoms and autonomy having a personal source of income grants them. Rural areas tend to maintain more traditional gender roles, as much of the women's earnings are incorporated into the family. Women who participate in circular migration in China experience significant, lasting changes in their lives. For some, migration is associated with the desire for fewer children and a decrease in domestic violence. When these women migrate they have the opportunity to build social networks both within their home village and within their host community. For others, migration is associated with the low status of female migrant workers in urban areas and a decrease in the ability to participate in household decision making. Unfortunately, most women who migrate to the city are forced to work long hours for low wages and receive few benefits. In some cases, women have to enter a physically hostile working environment to provide for their families, such as working as a hostesses in a karaoke bar.

=== Mexico ===
Throughout much of the 20th century, a great deal of circular migration existed between the United States and Mexico. In general, this movement was seasonal migration spurred by the agricultural sector, and border crossings were frequently undocumented due to the lack of a border patrol. From 1942 to 1964, the Bracero Program facilitated the temporary migration of more than 4 million workers, often for multiple contracts that allowed for them to return repeatedly to the United States. Following this, the United States shifted towards stricter border control and began to grant fewer visas, disrupting the trend of circular migration. Because of the risks associated with illegal immigration, many former circular migrants began to settle permanently in the United States, though circular migration is still a common phenomenon in U.S.-Mexico immigration relations.

Many of the temporary labor programs in the United States are subject to abuse. The H-2A visas and H-2B visas, which typically go to Mexican migrants, are tied to specific jobs, giving the employers a lot of control over the migrants who work for them. Because of the lack of regulation, enforcement, and supervision in both Mexico and the United States, many migrants are exploited in the process of moving locations. Often, a migrant will purchase a visa for a particular job from a recruiter, only to cross the border and be forced to work in a different position or in poor working conditions with insufficient pay. Though the aim of the system is to promote legal circular migration, the system actually results in illegal and permanent stays.

=== Puerto Rico ===
Puerto Ricans can travel to and from the United States without visa permits because of Puerto Rico's commonwealth status. Thus, the relative ease of migration between the United States and Puerto Rico makes this case particularly pertinent. In the 1970s, migration from Puerto Rico to the United States was surpassed by reverse migration back to the homeland. This circular flow of migration is facilitated by the establishment of "mobile livelihoods" by these migrants. Circulators establish "dual home bases", in their place of origin and their U.S. destination. They maintain strong social, familial, economic and political ties to their homeland. These connections broaden the cultural identities and opportunities available to circulators.

For Puerto Rican women, circular migration is often affected by familial and marital status. Single women and mothers, or women who have recently experienced a change in marital status, such as divorce, are more likely to migrate to the United States than those women in stable and/or large families. Additionally, once women migrate to the United States they are less likely to return to Puerto Rico than men.

=== South Africa ===
In South Africa, circular migration exists partly because of the population mobility associated with Apartheid. Cheap labor for men existed primarily in mines and industry in urban areas, pulling men from rural areas around the country. However, their family members who were unemployed were legally bound to remain their rural villages, thus establishing a pattern of circular migration that continues to this day. The mining and industrial centres attract workers from rural areas within South Africa as well as rural areas in neighboring countries. There is a minimum of 2.5 million legal migrants, but the number of undocumented workers is likely very high, and 55% of households in 2001 had at least one temporary migrant.

In recent years, the number of female circular migrants has increased rapidly. In the second half of the nineteenth century, South Africa's internal policies permitted only men to legally migrate to the city. "Influx control" measures were lifted in 1986, thus paving the way for women to begin migrating to urban areas. However, the change first affected permanent migration patterns, as female circular migration did not begin to increase substantially until over a decade later, mostly because of changing economic conditions. Overall, mobility in South Africa is high and continues to grow, as circular migration is carried out to look for work and raise children in areas with better schools.

== Circular migration and development ==
=== Policy implications ===
Circular migration also plays an important role in international development, and policy initiatives have the potential to aid in this development. Many policy makers from both national and international institutions are advocating for policies that make the movement of migrant workers between their home and host countries easier. Ideally, established circular migration systems facilitated and protected by the law would allow for the "triple-win" scenario that benefits countries of origin, countries of destination and the migrants themselves. The International Organization for Migration advocates that destination countries should provide mechanisms that promote repeat and regular circular migration, while also providing incentives to return to their same job. There are several possible measures that would increase the ease and impact of circular migration. The provision of legal residential status and flexible work visas would likely allow for increased circular migration between countries. Giving returning migrants priority for residency permits for additional temporary employment over first-time migrants would make it easier for circular migrants to obtain official legal status, which has shown to be beneficial for migration.

In addition, long-term multi-entry visas provided to return migrants would encourage multiple and repeated trips. Furthermore, one of the most simple policy recommendations is that governments should promote the free movement of individuals within the borders of their own countries. Lastly, in an effort to combat brain drain, the World Bank has called for developed countries to pay a tax to developing countries in order to make up for the loss of human capital.

The European Union's policy on circular migration is addressed in a 2007 Communication on circular migration and mobility partnerships between the European Union and third countries, which arose from a 2006 European Council decision to explore how best to facilitate circular and temporary migration.

=== Relevance ===
The issue of circular migration and its relation to development is especially relevant today. First, understanding the importance of transnationalism and the temporary and repetitive movement of migrants between countries has facilitated new thinking, specifically with regards to remittances and organized labor schemes. Second, the "win-win-win" discourse is being considered seriously as a potential option for development to provide benefits for all parties involved. Third, in the current political climate many parts of the developed world are against migration, so circular migration is an option that policy makers believe is more in touch with public opinion. Lastly, advances in technology have enabled government officials to monitor migrants as they move between their home and host countries.

== See also ==
- Human migration
- International migration
- Urbanization
- Rural flight
- Internal migration
