= Middleman minority =

Minority whose main occupations link producers and consumers

A middleman minority is a minority population whose main occupations link producers and consumers as traders, moneylenders, service providers, etc. This often results in the minority having a disproportionately large role in trade, finance, or commerce, without holding the significant political power associated with a dominant minority.

A middleman minority does not hold an "extreme subordinate" status in society, but may suffer discrimination and bullying for being perceived as outsiders to both elite and majority populations. Middleman minorities are more likely to emerge in stratified or colonial societies, where significant power gaps may exist between dominant elites and subordinate consumers, thereby fulfilling a niche within the economic status gap.

Middleman minorities often are associated with stereotypes of greed or clannishness. During periods of economic or political instability, middleman minorities often arouse the hostility of their host society or are used as scapegoats, which has been theorized by Bonacich to perpetuate a reluctance to assimilate completely. Economic nationalism or exclusion from gainful employment can further reinforce tendencies to start businesses or create new economic value outside of existing value chains.

The "middleman minority" concept was developed by sociologists Hubert Blalock and Edna Bonacich in the 1960s and by following political scientists and economists, such as Thomas Sowell.

== Examples ==
In Africa

- Indians in East Africa, especially British Commonwealth countries
  - Indians in Uganda
  - Indians in Kenya
  - Indians in Tanzania
- Igbos in Nigeria
- In South Africa:
  - Indian South Africans
  - Cape Malays
- Syrians and Lebanese in West Africa

In South Asia

- Kashmiri Pandits in India
- Gujaratis in India
- Marwaris in India
- Parsis in India
- Bohras in India
- Marwaris in Nepal
- Thakalis in Nepal
- Newars in Nepal
- Tibetans in Nepal
- Tamils in colonial Sri Lanka

In North America

- Jewish Americans
- Armenian Americans
- Indian Americans
- Japanese Americans
- Korean Americans
- Chinese Americans
  - Chinese Americans in the Mississippi Delta
- Greek Americans
- Lebanese Americans

In South America

- Japanese in South America
- Lebanese in South America
- The majority of the 19th and early 20th centuries Middle Eastern immigrants to Brazil (Lebanese, Syrians, etc., collectively called "arabes" or "turcos", the latter term because they came from the Ottoman Empire) were peddlers, merchants and other types of non-"producers".

In West Asia

- Ottoman Greeks
- Arab Christians in the Arab world
- Hadhrami Arabs
- Armenians in the Ottoman Empire
- Armenians in Baku during the Russian Empire
- Persian Armenians in Safavid dynasty
- Azerbaijanis during the Imperial era of Iran (16th–20th centuries) and in contemporary Iran
- Azerbaijanis in the Tsardom of Russia, in the Russian Empire and in contemporary Russia
- Ottoman Jews
- Radhanite Jews

In East and Southeast Asia

- Particular Han Chinese subgroups in modern-day China
  - Min-speaking people
  - Wu-speaking people
  - Cantonese people
  - Hakka people
- Koreans in Manchuria in the late Qing Dynasty era and in modern-day Northeast China
- Hui people in China
- Chinese in Mongolia during Qing rule
- Chinese in Southeast Asia
  - Chinese Filipinos
  - Thai Chinese
  - Chinese Indonesians
  - Malaysian Chinese
    - Peranakan Chinese
- Indians in Southeast Asia
- Bugis and Minangkabau in Indonesia and Malaysia

Elsewhere

- Indo-Fijians
- European Jews
- Vietnamese in the Czech Republic

== See also ==
- Colonialism, particularly exploitation colonialism and plantation colonies
- Dominant minority
- Minoritarianism
- Model minority
- Neocolonialism
- World on Fire, which discusses the similar concept of "market-dominant minorities"
- Yuri Slezkine's book The Jewish Century (2004) discussed the concept of "Mercurian" people "specializ[ing] exclusively in providing services to the surrounding food-producing societies," which are characterized as "Apollonians"
