= Secondary labor market =

The secondary labor market is the labor market consisting of high-turnover, low-pay, and usually part-time or temporary work. Sometimes, secondary jobs are performed by high school or college students. The majority of service sector, light manufacturing, and retail jobs are considered secondary labor.

Secondary market jobs are sometimes referred to as "food and filth" jobs, a reference to workers in fast food, retail, or yard work, for example.

A secondary-market job is distinct from a "secondary worker". The latter term refers to someone in a family (traditionally, the wife or a child) who earns a smaller income than the "breadwinner" in order to supplement family income.

== See also ==
- Ethnic enclave
- Labor market segmentation
- Primary labor market
- Temporary work
- Underemployment
