= Secondary deviance =

From a sociological perspective, deviance is defined as the violation or drift from the accepted social norms.

Secondary deviance is a stage in a theory of deviant identity formation. Introduced by Edwin Lemert in 1951, primary deviance is engaging in the initial act of deviance, he subsequently suggested that secondary deviance is the process of a deviant identity, integrating it into conceptions of self, potentially affecting the individual long term. For example, if a gang engaged in primary deviant behavior such as acts of violence, dishonesty or drug addiction, subsequently moved to legally deviant or criminal behavior, such as murder, this would be the stage of secondary deviance.

Primary acts of deviance are common in everyone, however these are rarely thought of as criminal acts. Secondary deviance is much more likely to be considered as criminal in a social context. The act is likely to be labelled as deviant and criminal, which can have the effect of an individual internalizing that label and acting out accordingly.

Lemert made another distinction between primary deviance and secondary deviance. Originally, there may not be a distinguished group of "deviant" people, but instead we all switch in and out of deviant behavior and a minority or these individuals starting the rule-breaking acts actually get the attention of others. In that very moment, a person is engaging in secondary deviance and it is said that they start following a more deviant path, or a deviant career - would be a set of roles shaped by the reactions of others in different situations. One's self-identity is vulnerable to all of the social judgement and criticism, and once more we see the continued interplay between the mind, self and society. As Erving Goffman (1961, 1963) showed, when an individual is labelled with a "discrediting" social attribute like shyness can often serve as a permanent mark on one's character.

== Deviancy process ==
Lemert listed out the process, which he decided, was the way that an individual becomes a secondary deviant.

1. Primary Deviation;
2. Societal Penalties;
3. Further primary deviation;
4. Stronger penalties and rejections;
5. Further deviation;
6. Crisis reached in the tolerance quotient, expressed in formal action by the community stigmatizing the deviant;
7. Strengthening of the deviant conduct as a reaction to the stigmatizing and penalties, and;
8. Ultimate acceptance of deviant and social status and efforts at adjustment on the basis of the associated role.

== Secondary deviance in culture and society ==
=== Japan ===
In Japan the punitive sanctions tend to be more important. The conditions in prison are harsh and some of the interrogated offenders have their rights disregarded. However, Japan has decreased their criminal recidivism rate. Criminal Recidivism is repetition of criminal behavior by an offender previously convicted and punished for an offence. It is also a measure of the effectiveness of rehabilitation programs or the deterrent effect of punishment. Explaining recidivism in the U.S., the labeling or secondary deviance perspective has some merit to go with it. Individuals in both countries have common point of views that are unique to their own cultures. As part of the individualism enforced in the United States, individuals are taught to seek self-importance and personal autonomy. One learns that he or she is not supposed to submit to others but should always try to ascend above and beyond others. The offender surfaces in the weak relationship built between the individual and the society in which it requires them to accept authority. The offender is usually prepared to test their social power and have a negative response in order to prove that they are still more important than society itself. Opposite to the conventional labeling perspective which is said to promote secondary deviance, social reaction actually provides for aggravating secondary deviance. In Japan, an individual appreciates the society in which he was born and raised. That tendency comes from what is learned culturally about integration with the society. The social reaction towards offenders in Japan has slighter recidivist consequences rather than in the United States.

== See also ==
- Deviance (sociology)
- Drug addiction
- Edwin Lemert
- Erving Goffman
- Interactionism
- Labelling theory
- Primary deviance
- Recidivism
