= Social contact =

Social contact can refer to:

- In the sociological hierarchy leading up to social relations, an incidental social interaction between individuals
- In social networks, a node (representing an individual or organization) to which another node is socially

== See also ==
- Social contract
- Interpersonal relationship
