= Cheng Shewo =

- 成舍我
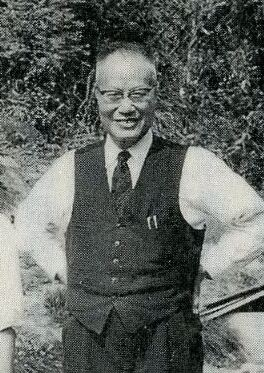
- Cheng Shewo in 1956
- Born: Cheng Xun (成勛); August 28, 1898; Nanjing, Qing Empire
- Died: April 2, 1991 (aged 92); Taipei, Taiwan
- Other name: Cheng Ping (成平)
- Education: Peking University
- Occupations: Newspaperman, educator
- Years active: 1913–1991
- Spouse(s): Yang Fan (楊璠); Xiao Zongrang (蕭宗讓); Han Jingliang (韓鏡良)
- Children: Cheng Youshu, Cheng Zhifan, Cheng Siwei; Cheng Jialing, Lucie Cheng
- Parent: father: Cheng Bi (成壁)
- Relatives: grandfather: Cheng Ceda (成策達)

Cheng Shewo (Chinese: 成舍我; pinyin: Chéng Shěwǒ; Wade–Giles: Ch'eng She-wo; 28 August 1898 – 1 January 1991) was a journalist, publisher, and educator of the Republic of China. He was the founder of Shih Hsin University in Taiwan.

== Biography ==
Cheng was born in Nanjing in 1898, with his ancestral home in Xiangxiang, Hunan. His father, Cheng Bi (成壁), was an officer.

In 1912, Cheng went out into the world when he was 14 years old. At age 17, Cheng worked as an editor in Jianbao (健報). In 1913, Cheng started to publish articles. In 1915, Cheng went to Shanghai to found the Maiwen Company (賣文公司). In 1917, Cheng moved to Beijing, he graduated from Peking University in 1921, where he majored in Chinese Literature. After graduation, Cheng founded World Evening News (世界晚報), World Daily (世界日報), and World Illustrated (世界畫報). In 1927, Cheng returned to Nanjing to found Min Sheng Bao (民生報).

From 1930 to 1931, Cheng visited France, Switzerland, Belgium, Germany, and the United Kingdom. In this trip Cheng observed modern European societies and cultures for the first time.

In 1933, Cheng founded Beijing News College (北京新聞專科學校). In 1935, Cheng founded Lihpao Daily (立報).

Cheng was elected a member of the Constituent National Assembly in 1946 and to the Legislative Yuan, representing Beijing, in 1948.

When the People's Liberation Army occupied Beijing, Cheng escaped to Hong Kong. Cheng settled in Taiwan in 1952.

In the late 1950s, Cheng Shewo and Yeh Ming-hsun co-founded the Shih Hsin School of Journalism (now Shih Hsin University) in Taiwan.

In 1991, Cheng died of illness in Taipei.

== Personal life ==
Cheng was married three times. He had two children (two daughters) with Yang Fan, three children with Xiao Zongrang (蕭宗讓) and no children with Han Jingliang (韓鏡良).

With Yang Fan:

- Cheng Youshu (成幼殊) (1924–2021), a Chinese diplomat and poet.
- Cheng Zhifan (成之凡) (born 1928), a Chinese-French musician

With Xiao Zongrang:

- Cheng Siwei (成思危) (1935–2015), a Chinese politician
- Cheng Chia-ling (成嘉玲), (born 1937), a Taiwanese educator
- Lucie Cheng (成露茜), (1939–2010) a professor in Shih Hsin University
