= Cultural deprivation =

Cultural deprivation is a theory in sociology where a person has inferior norms, values, skills and knowledge. The theory states that people of lower social classes experience cultural deprivation compared with those above and that this disadvantages them, as a result of which the gap between classes increases.

For example, in education, lower-class students can suffer from cultural deprivation as their parents do not know the best school for their child, but middle-class parents "know the system", and so can send their children to the best school for them. This puts the lower-class students at a disadvantage, thus increasing inequality and the gap between middle-class and lower-class students.

Proponents of this theory argue that working class culture (regardless of race, gender, ethnicity or other factors) inherently differs from that of people in the middle class. This difference in culture means that while middle-class children can easily acquire cultural capital by observing their parents, working-class children cannot, and this deprivation is self-perpetuating.

The theory claims that the middle class gains cultural capital as the result of primary socialization, while the working class does not. Cultural capital helps the middle class succeed in society because their norms and values facilitate educational achievement and subsequent employability. Working-class members of society that lack cultural capital do not pass it on to their children, perpetuating the class system. Middle-class children's cultural capital allows them to communicate with their middle-class teachers more effectively than working-class children and this contributes to social inequality.

Bourdieu claimed that state schools are set up to make everybody middle-class, although only the middle class and some high-achieving working class have the cultural capital to achieve this. From a Marxist perspective, cultural deprivation observes that the resources available to the working class are limited and that working-class children enter school less well-prepared than others.

== Sources ==
- Willis, Paul E. (1977). Learning to Labor: How Working Class Kids Get Working Class Jobs. Columbia University Press. ISBN 978-0-231-05357-0.
- Webb, Jen; Schirato, Tony; Danaher, Geoff (29 March 2002). Understanding Bourdieu. SAGE Publications. ISBN 978-0-7619-7463-5.
- Morais, Ana; Neves, I.; Davies, B.; Daniels, H. (1 January 2001). Towards a Sociology of Pedagogy: The Contributions of Basil Bernstein to Research. Peter Lang Publishing, Incorporated. ISBN 978-0-8204-5585-3.
