= John Kitsuse =

American sociologist (1923–2003)

John Itsuro Kitsuse (1923, Imperial Valley, California, US - 27 November 2003, Santa Cruz, California, US) was an American professor of sociology who contributed to the sociology of social problems, criminology and deviance. Kitsuse is famous for his pioneer work in studying social problems as social constructions. From 1977 until his death, Kitsuse and his colleague Malcolm Spector published some of their research in this field in their book Constructing Social Problems. As a second generation Japanese American, Kitsuse was imprisoned in an American internment camp from 1942 to 1943, due to the ongoing war between the United States and Japan.
