= Gibault School for Boys =

School in Indiana, United States

Coordinates: 39°23′21.4″N 87°23′49.8″W

Conceived in 1909 by the Indiana Knights of Columbus, and named for Fr. Pierre Gibault, the Gibault School for Boys was dedicated on October 9, 1921, in Terre Haute, Indiana as a "home for wayward boys". The first director of the school was Rev. Michael Gorman.

== History ==
The Indiana Knights of Columbus founded Father Gibault Home for Boys in 1921 and was originally administered by Priests of the Archdiocese of Indianapolis. As the facility quickly exceeded its original capacity of 25 boys, two new halls were added: Chartrand Hall was completed in 1922, and Aldering Hall in 1926. The staff was expanded in 1934, when the administration of the school turned over to the Catholic Brothers of Holy Cross from Notre Dame, IN. All administrators, teachers, counselors, and overseers where now employed by the Congregation of Holy Cross in partnership with the Indiana Knight. The first Holy Cross era director was Rupert Poudrier, and under his administration, the school was expanded to allow boys from every midwestern state.

In 1936 there were 54 boys at Gibault. In an official report, Isaac McIntosh expressed the hope that the juvenile offenders could be returned to society as considerate and eager young man, who would be "fit in every way to fight the battle of life" after their rehabilitation. One of the priests was cited saying that most of the boys had suffered parental neglect, a lack of home training and an unfavorable environment, before their arrival at Gibault.

School corporal punishment was still normal, when Charles Manson was admitted in 1947. According to him the punishment for any kind of infraction included beatings which were performed either with a wooden paddle or a leather strap.

Today, Gibault, Inc. is known as Gibault Children's Services. Gibault serves both boys and girls at three locations and employs over 250 staff members.

== Notable former students ==
After committing his first crimes as a juvenile offender, William Heirens, who became known as the Lipstick Killer, was sentenced to attend the school for one year by a juvenile court in the early 1940s.

At the age of 13, Charles Manson was sent to Gibault after he was found guilty for stealing in 1947. Manson ran away, before his time at the school was officially terminated.
