= Status generalization =

In sociology, as defined by Murray Webster JR. and James Driskell, status generalization is:

"the process by which statuses of actors external to a particular interaction are imported and allowed to determine important features of that interaction."

As an example, Webster and Driskell cite the tendency of white male executives to become group leaders even if their executive skills are not relevant to the group's task.

== Research ==
Timothy Brezina and Kenisha Winder (2003) researched white people's racial stereotyping of blacks and the association between black people and lower socioeconomic statuses. They found that negative racial stereotyping is fueled by the continuing association between race and economic disadvantage. The mindset is that “if blacks continue to fall behind economically, then they must not be trying hard enough”.

Paul Thomas Monroe focuses on the situation in which a low-status person gains legitimate authority or power in higher-status positions. This theory was tested using an experiment designed to have two-by-two groups working on cooperative tasks.

- One person in the group was a confederate trying to display dominant characteristics
- The reaction of the second group member to the dominant behaviors served as the dependent variable in the study. These results show that performance evaluation had an effect on influence and status consistency.

== Context ==
The concept of status generalization can be applied to groups that are assembled to perform a task. A group member's external status (race, age, gender, or occupation), as opposed to his or her skill, may determine their roles within the group.

Julian Oldmeadow, Michael Platow, and Margaret Foddy state:

“the underlying psychological process that gives rise to (status generalization) in naturally occurring task-groups is psychological group formation, understood as self-categorization and social identification with other task-group members.”
