= Social ecology =

Social ecology may refer to:

- Social ecology (academic field), the study of relationships between people and their environment, often the interdependence of people, collectives and institutions
- Social ecological model, frameworks for depicting the conceptual interrelations between environmental and personal factors
- Social-ecology, a French political movement

== See also ==
- Socioecology, the scientific study of how social structure and organization are influenced by an organism's environment
