= Lifestyle trends and media =

Lifestyle changes have been increasing slowly since the introduction of media. Lifestyle changes include how people eat, dress, and communicate. Media – films, television shows, magazines, and more recently, the Internet (i.e. self-written blogs and popular websites) are the main sources of lifestyle influence around the world. Douglas Kellner writes, "Radio, television, film, and the other products of media culture provide materials out of which we forge our very identities; our sense of selfhood; our notion of what it means to be male or female; our sense of class, of ethnicity and race, of nationality, of sexuality; and of "us" and "them.""

Lifestyle trends are influenced by public figures through leisure visibility and paid advertisements. The advent of newspapers, magazines, and television enabled public observation of various lifestyles. Following its creation, the Internet became a primary medium for observing and influencing trends among both public figures and the general public.

The average American household has two personal computers, making the Internet easily accessible. The computer era has changed the way people obtain their news, perspectives and communication. Magazines are still popular, but advertisers now often supply a web address where consumers can visit for more information than a print ad can provide. Advertisers have tapped into social media, including Facebook, Twitter, and Tumblr to take advantage of word-of-mouth marketing. The rise of user-generated content is exemplified by the fact that anyone with Internet access can create a blog or an online journal, whether personal or commercial, which might detail someone's experience in a new restaurant, a purchased item of clothing or knickknack, or a review for a film.

== Celebrity-endorsed beauty and health products ==
Media affects how people diet. Commercials advertise special pills, juice fasts, raw diets, and all-soy diets. Celebrities endorse food products and diets that promise dramatic results in little time. Audiences are impressionable depending on their age range. Salma Hayek, who has been using juice cleanses for 15 years, promises health with her own line, Cooler Cleanse. Jennifer Aniston is famous for her yoga-body and has revealed her secret, which the public has taken as a big health influence. So Feminine provides health and lifestyle advice taken from celebrities and their personal assistants and trainers. Reality star Kim Kardashian endorsed QuickTrim, a weight-loss product designed to get rid of unwanted weight. According to news articles, the product is potentially harmful, and Kardashian faced a lawsuit for her endorsement.

Along with cleanses, celebrities also endorse beauty products. Salma Hayek has a CVS-exclusive line of hair care and cosmetic products, called Nuance. Websites such as Cosmopolitan and Celebrity Beauty Buzz list favorite skincare and makeup products of celebrities so readers can purchase the same products in hopes of achieving similar results. The Harvard School of Public Health states, "With [media reports'] emphasis on short, 'newsworthy' pieces, the media often only report the results of single studies, and many stories are chosen simply because the results run contrary to current health recommendations." Popular magazines and websites often focus on reporting these quick-fix celebrity health and beauty routines and forgo substantial research.

Celebrity endorsements are effective due to their high-profile presence in the media. Their physical attractiveness is central to their ability to sell products to an impressionable audience. Celebrities are also effective because they are what many people aspire to be or look like, and thus act as symbols of personal desire. "In an attempt to communicate the merits of their product or brand," says Michael A. Kamins (New York University), "advertisers have often chosen to use endorsement as a promotional strategy." Additionally, "the use of celebrity spokespeople has always been a favorite strategy among agencies." Kamins explains that advertisers are well aware of how easily celebrities influence consumer habits; it is the combination of their physical appeal and their high status that draws in the public. He writes, "Indeed, a considerable amount of research exists both in the social sciences and in marketing supporting a strategy by showing that a physically attractive source facilitates attitude change toward issues, products, and ad-based evaluations."

Research suggests that there is a link between the product itself and the image of the celebrity. The physical attractiveness of the celebrity endorser improves the appearance of the product, or rather, the advertisement. In simpler terms, advertising may be more effective if "the characteristics of the product 'match-up' with the image conveyed by the celebrity," as suggested by Kamins' research. He continues, "This 'match-up' hypothesis suggests that the visual imagery contained in the ad conveys information over and above that contained in explicit verbal arguments." The match-up hypothesis "specifies that perceivers distinguish multiple types of good looks, and that in advertising, certain beauty ideals are more appropriately paired with specific products than with others." Kahle and Homer write, "In the match-up hypothesis, the message conveyed by the image of the celebrity and the message about the product ought to converge in effective advertisements."

Research also notes that physical attractiveness is the key detail when analyzing consumer behavior. If a celebrity is less than attractive according to society's standards, the advertising campaign may potentially be less effective. Still, advertisements starring celebrities are generally effective due to their popularity and presence in media. There are times when physical attractiveness of the celebrity is not relevant, such as when the product showcased in the advertisement does not claim to enhance the consumer's appearance. Under this circumstance, the "match-up" hypothesis does not apply because the product is not particularly attractive. Attractive products include luxurious sports cars, designer clothing, anti-aging products, beauty products (i.e. foundation that smooths fine lines, blemishes, pigmentation, and promises a flawless canvas onto which the rest of a woman's makeup may be applied), hair care (i.e. shampoos, conditioners, and shine-enhancing serums that boast rare ingredients and professional results), modern-day technology products such as everything Apple produces (iPhone, Mac computers) and the brands that strive to mimic these products' sleek appearances, etc. "Unattractive" products include toilet paper, household cleaning items, groceries and food, personal hygiene products, music, movies, etc. Though, it can be debated that music and movies do not depend on the attractiveness of its performers; attractiveness vs. talent in the respective fields depends on many factors regarding the consumers, such as age and gender.

B. Zafer Erdogan says, "Because of their fame, celebrities serve not only to create and maintain attention, but also to achieve high recall rates for marcoms messages (marketing communication) in today's highly cluttered environments." This serves as proof that advertising agencies use celebrities to cut through the clutter that is mass media. Having celebrities in their advertising campaigns helps them promote their products in the sense that notable figures are what gets the attention of the public, rather than the product itself.

== Beauty ideal and plastic surgery ==
Among the many beauty and health products advertised and media showcasing celebrity beauty as the most desired beauty, is the frustration that comes with consumers using these products and not achieving the results they want. A psychological study found a significant association between the acceptance of cosmetic surgery and prevalence of celebrity influence. "Celebrity worship" is when a person has formed a strong adoration towards a celebrity and sees him or her as a role model. The study shows that this worship is considered a normal aspect of self-identity as it is usually formed as the identity is being developed. Worship of the celebrity may give people a sense of satisfaction or fulfillment. The study mentions that "'entertainment-social' celebrity worship reflects the social aspects of parasocial attachment, and is driven by an attraction to a favourite celebrity because of their perceived ability to entertain. For some individuals, a compromised identity structure may lead to psychological absorption (intensive and compulsive feelings) with a celebrity, or what has been termed 'intense-personal' attitudes. In extreme cases, this absorption may become addictive, leading to 'borderline-pathological' attitudes and behaviours that serve to maintain an individual's satisfaction with the parasocial attachment."

Additionally, celebrities may be used as symbols exemplary of a person's physical ideal. They may believe that their physical attractiveness will bring them things equal to or similar to the celebrity's level of popularity and exterior happiness, and cosmetic surgery can help them attain this. The study explains that "celebrities may represent prominent and unique social comparison targets, whose physical attractiveness and condition provide information about socially-idealised standards of beauty."

Celebrity worship makes people more prone to mental health problems such as high levels of neuroticism, anxiety, depression, and an overall strong sense of worry. Being fixated on how a celebrity looks can increase anxiety because it causes the person to constantly compare themselves to them, thus creating excessive worry and high maintenance of their appearance, and eventually depression due to the fact that they cannot look like or be their role model. These people are likely to seek procedures such as plastic surgery in order in hopes of becoming as physically appealing as their celebrity role model, and hopefully happier as a result. They consider plastic surgery a cure, or a fix, for their unhappiness, and therefore are more likely to find it acceptable.

== Effect of blogs and Internet ==
Kellner states, "Media images help shape our view of the world and our deepest values: what we consider good or bad, positive or negative, moral or evil. Media stories provide the symbols, myths, and resources through which we constitute a common culture and through the appropriation of which we insert ourselves into this culture." For example, fashion and beauty blogs focus on the values of looking a certain way, or what society deems as "stylish". These websites bring together people with the same goals – i.e. looking good – and cultivate a culture in which the beauty myth is prevalent.

One such blog, fashion magazine Nylon, is geared toward pre-teens and teenagers who aim to live fashionably. The magazine dispenses beauty advice for how to look like their favorite television star and promotes expression of style. Its influence is prevalent in the blogosphere. Young women with blogs take photos of themselves in their daily outfits. They often cite Nylon, among other sources, as one of their influences. Style blogs showcase young women posing in the latest fashions. The thin ideal often comes into play. Young girls see these images and want to emulate their style.

Another example is Gwyneth Paltrow's popular lifestyle blog/website Goop, which is geared towards parents, specifically women. She provides spirituality articles, family meal recipes, glimpses into her Hollywood life, and child-raising tips. Paltrow advises wardrobe changes every season and provides essential-clothing suggestions that are far out of reach for the average woman.

In addition to blogs, social networking cites such as Facebook play a role in media influence. Many celebrities and clothing stores have Facebook profiles in which fans subscribe to receive a constant stream of news from these pages on their Facebook news feeds. Celebrities promote their latest films, television appearance, favorite charities, self-endorsed items, and those who are subscribed to them remain in-the-know and are kept up to date of their words. Clothing stores update their pages with photos of their seasonal collections, showcasing attractive young models dressed in their fashions, thus creating images of desire in their audiences.

== Sexuality and social media ==
Adolescents use the Internet for various purposes, such as keeping in contact with friends or partners. Particularly, some of them have used it for online sexual activities (OSA), especially for cybersex. OSA can be seen as a means of sexual exploration, important and healthy in the adolescent development. Many television shows, music, and magazines aimed towards teens tend to be dominated by a certain type of highly sexualized content and imagery. Even before social media, newspapers were publishing articles about sex and sexuality. In Thailand, the way girls practice their sexuality and sexual relationships due to social media has caused public concern and moral panic because the girls are challenging traditional sexual moral standards. Due to the fact that many social media accounts have easy access to things that could influence sexuality and the vast amount of television shows characterizing LGBTQ social media and the media in general have had a huge influence on sexuality and the lifestyle of humans all over the world.
