= Lucie Cheng =

Taiwanese sociologist

- 成露茜
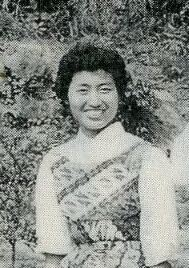
- Born: February 11, 1939; British Hong Kong
- Died: January 27, 2010 (aged 70); Zhongzheng District, Taipei, Taiwan
- Other name: Lucie Cheng Hirata
- Citizenship: Taiwanese, British, USA
- Education: National Taiwan University (BA); University of Chicago (MS); University of Hawaiʻi at Mānoa (MA, PhD)
- Known for: First director of Asian American Studies Center, UCLA; Founder of the Cheng She-Wo Institute for Chinese Journalism, Shih Hsin University
- Scientific career
- Fields: Sociology
- Workplaces: University of California, Los Angeles; Shih Hsin University, Taiwan
- Thesis: Immigrant Integration in a Polyethnic Society (1971)

Lucie Cheng (Chinese: 成露茜; pinyin: Chéng Lùxī) was a Taiwanese sociologist who was known for her work in Asian American studies, as well as being the first permanent director of the Asian American Studies Center at the University of California, Los Angeles (UCLA). She was also one of the first academics from the United States to visit mainland China after the country normalized its relations with China.

== Early life ==
Cheng was born to journalist Cheng Shewo and Hsiao Tsung-jang (蕭宗讓) in Hong Kong during the Second Sino-Japanese War. As a result of her father's job, Cheng moved frequently with her family during her youth to places around China, including Guilin, Chongqing, and Beiping. After the end of the war, the family returned to Hong Kong, though Cheng's older brother later returned to People's Republic of China to help further the socialist cause. In 1952, the family moved Cheng and her elder sister Catherine Chia-lin Cheng (成嘉玲) to Taiwan.

== Education ==
After attending Taipei First Girls' High School, Cheng graduated from National Taiwan University with a bachelor's degree in foreign languages. In her second year as an undergraduate, she studied music abroad at the University of Hawaii, despite her father's objections. During her stay, Cheng worked as a babysitter for a wealthy American family; the experience piqued her interest in class stratification. She then went on to earn an M.A. in sociology from the University of Hawaiʻi at Mānoa, an M.S. in library studies from the University of Chicago, and her Ph.D. from the University of Hawaii in 1970.

== Career ==
=== United States ===
Cheng became an assistant professor of sociology at UCLA in 1970. Due to her engagements with politics and student movements, she became the first permanent director of the university's Asian American Studies Center since it was founded in 1969. Cheng developed and expanded the center, employing major scholars like Valerie Matsumoto, Robert A. Nakamura, and Russell Leong. Under Cheng, the center was run under socialist principles, with students and teachers rejecting hierarchical structures considered typical in capitalist America.

In 1978, alongside the Chinese Historical Society of Southern California, Cheng organised the 'Southern California Chinese American Oral History Project'. The project focused on the oral testimonies of the cultural struggles that grassroots Chinese Americans faced in the United States.

After the United States normalized its relations with China, Cheng visited a Chinese university with other members of UCLA and became one of the first academics from the country to visit the mainland. Cheng had, however, visited China throughout the 1970s in a personal capacity, searching for her brother and sister on her father's behalf. During one visit, she met with Zhou Enlai, who informed her that her father was no longer considered an enemy by the Communist Party.

In 1985, Cheng founded the Center of Pacific Rim Studies at UCLA.

=== Taiwan ===
Cheng took over her father's Taiwan-based paper, the Li pao (Chinese: 立報; pinyin: lì bào), in 1991 and continued to support leftist causes. She then divided her time between the United States and Taiwan, teaching at Shih Hsin University, before becoming a professor there in 1993, when she founded a course on gender and development.

In 2006, she founded Sifang pao (Chinese: 四方報; pinyin: sìfāng bào), a paper aimed at Vietnamese and Thai immigrants and migrant workers.

== Honours ==
- 2011 35th Golden Tripod Award - special contribution.
- The Lucie Cheng Prize is awarded by the Amerasia Journal, and recognises outstanding student essays in Asian American and Pacific Islander Studies.

== Selected works ==
=== Books ===
- Lucie Cheng; Edna Bonacich (1984). Labor Immigration Under Capitalism: Asian Workers in the United States Before World War II. University of California Press. ISBN 9780520048294.
- Lucie Cheng (1984). Linking Our Lives: Chinese American Women of Los Angeles. The Society. ISBN 9780930377007.
- Paul Ong; Edna Bonacich; Lucie Cheng (1994). The New Asian Immigration in Los Angeles and Global Restructuring. Temple University Press.
- Lucie Cheng (2012). Xia Xiaojuan 夏曉鵑 (ed.). 理論與實踐的開拓：成露茜論文集 [Pioneer of Theory and Praxis: Selected Works of Lucie Cheng] (in Chinese). Taiwan shehui yanjiu zazhi she. ISBN 9789868673557.

=== Articles ===
- Bernard B. Black; Lucie Cheng Hirata (1973). "Mental Illness Among the Chinese: Myth or Reality?". Journal of Social Issues. 29 (2): 146–166. doi:10.1111/j.1540-4560.1973.tb00078.x.
- Lucie Cheng Hirata (1979). "Free, Indentured, Enslaved: Chinese Prostitutes in Nineteenth-Century America". Signs: Journal of Women in Culture and Society. 5 (1): 3–29. doi:10.1086/493680. S2CID 143464846.
- Lucie Cheng; Yen Espiritu (1989). "Korean Businesses in Black and Hispanic Neighborhoods: A Study of Intergroup Relations". Sociological Perspectives. 32 (4): 521–534. doi:10.2307/1389136. JSTOR 1389136. S2CID 145565753.
- Lucie Cheng; Arthur Rosett (1991). "Contract with a Chinese Face: Socially Embedded Factors in the Transformation from Hierarchy to Market, 1978-1989". Journal of Chinese Law. 5 (2): 143–244.
- Lucie Cheng; Ping-Chun Hsiung (1994). "Women, Export-oriented Growth, and the State: The Case of Taiwan". In Joel D. Aberdach; David Dollar; Kenneth L. Sokoloff (eds.). The Role of the State in Taiwan's Development. New York: ME Sharpe. pp. 321–352. ISBN 9780765636478.
- Lucie Cheng; P. Q. Yang (1996). "Asians: The 'Model Minority' Deconstructed". In R. Waldinger; M. Borzormehr (eds.). Ethnic Los Angeles. New York: Russell Sage Foundation. pp. 305–344. ISBN 978-0871549020.
