= Dual labour market =

The dual labour market (also referred to as the segmented labour market) theory aims at introducing a broader range of factors into economic research, such as institutional aspects, race and gender. It divides the economy into two parts, called the "primary" and "secondary" sectors. The distinction may also be drawn between formal/informal sectors or sectors with high/low value-added. A broader concept is that of labour market segmentation. While the word "dual" implies a division into two parallel markets, segmentation in its broadest sense may involve several distinct labour markets.

In a dual labour market, a secondary sector is characterized by short-term employment relationships, little or no prospect of internal promotion, and the determination of wages primarily by market forces. In terms of occupations, it consists primarily of low or unskilled jobs, whether they are blue-collar (manual labour), white-collar (e.g. filing clerks), or service industry (e.g. waiters). These jobs are linked by the fact that they are characterized by "low skill levels, low earnings, easy entry, job impermanence, and low returns to education or experience."

The informal economy consists of labour that is often "pay-under-the-table". This market tends to attract the poor and a disproportionate number of minority group members. The dual labour market theory generally ignores the micro-level decisions such as an individual’s cost-benefit analysis. Instead, it focuses on immigration as a “natural consequence of economic globalization and market penetration across national boundaries” (Massey, et al., 1993, p. 432). In whole, it is not concerned with individual decisions to migrate but focuses on what pulls them, as a collective group, to migrate. It argues that international migration starts from the labour demands of modern civilization.
