= Shih Hsin University =

University in Taipei, Taiwan

Coordinates: 24.9899°N 121.5454°E

- 世新大學 (Chinese)
- Motto: 德智兼修、手腦並用
- Motto in English: Master virtue and wisdom through practicality
- Type: Private
- Established: 1956; 70 years ago
- Affiliations: U12 Consortium; UMAP
- Chairman: Nathan Chow
- President: Joe Y. C. Wu
- Location: Taipei, Taiwan
- Website: shu.edu.tw (in Chinese) english.web.shu.edu.tw (in English)

Shih Hsin University
- Traditional Chinese: 世新大學
- Simplified Chinese: 世新大学
Transcriptions
Standard Mandarin
- Hanyu Pinyin: Shìxīn Dàxué
- Wade–Giles: Shih⁴-hsin¹ Ta⁴-hsüeh²
Southern Min
- Hokkien POJ: Sè-sin Tāi-ha̍k

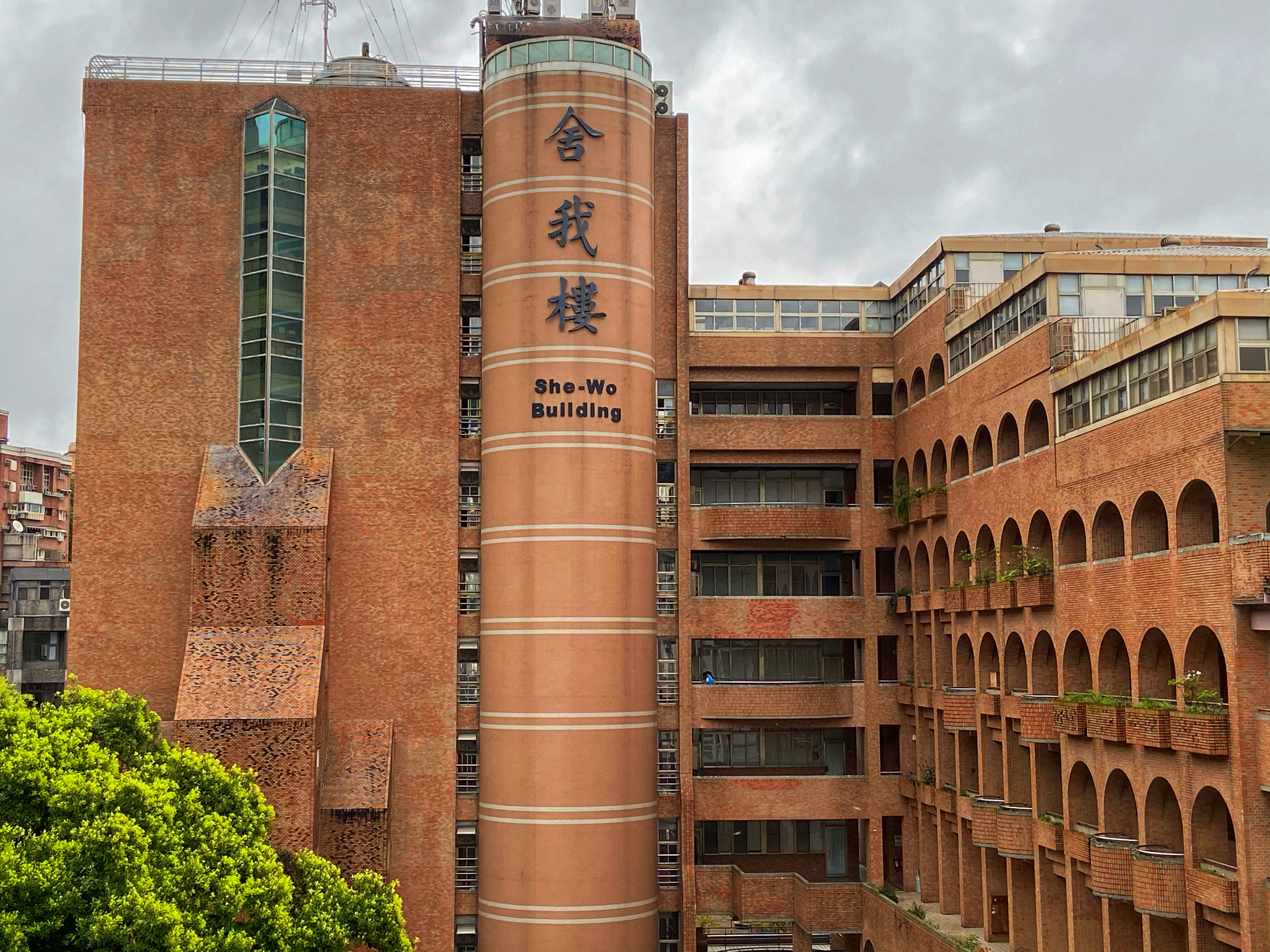
She-Wo Building

Shih Hsin University (SHU; Chinese: 世新大學; pinyin: Shìxīn Dàxué) is a private university in Wenshan District, Taipei, Taiwan.

== History ==
Shih Hsin University was re-established in Taiwan in 1956 as Shih Hsin School of Journalism by the journalists and publishers Cheng Shewo and Yeh Ming-hsun. Originally an institution devoted to training professional journalists, the school became a full-fledged university in August 1997. In Chinese, shih means "the world", and hsin means "new" or "news".

As re-establishing Yenching University in Taiwan was denied, SHU became the most liberal re-established Northern Chinese university in Taiwan, equal to National Tsing Hua University, Fu Jen University and Providence University with its emphasis on media freedom.

Now it has four colleges with an enrollment of around 10,000 students: the College of Journalism and Communication, the School of Management, the College of Humanities and Social Sciences, and the School of Law.

In October 2023, the university decided to close down its Chinese Literature Department within two years due to declining student enrollment .

== Schools and programs ==
With four colleges, Shih Hsin University has 19 departments and three graduate institutes; 19 offer bachelor's degrees, 17 offer master's degrees, and three offer PhD degrees.

College of Journalism and Communication

- Communications (PhD)
- Journalism (BA, MA)
- Radio, TV & Film (BA, MA)
- PR & Advertising (BA, MA)
- Graphic Communication (BA, MA)
- Speech Communication (BA, MA)
- Information Communication (BA, MA)
- Digital Multimedia Arts (BA, MA)
- Communication Management (BA, MA)

College of Management

- Information Management (BA, MA)
- Tourism (BA, MA)(ranked top in Taiwan in TSSCI)
- Finance (BA, MA)
- Public Policy and Management (only innovative Management specialization-oriented Undergraduate PPM course in Taiwan, including Management Mathematics and Finite Mathematics) (BA, MA, PhD)
- Business Management (BA, MA)

College of Humanities and Social Sciences

- Social Psychology (BA, MA)
- English and Applied Communication (BA)
- Chinese Literature (BA, MA, PhD)
- Japanese (BA)
- Economics (BA, MA)
- Graduate Institute for Social Transformation (MA)
- Graduate Institute for Gender Studies (MA)

College of Law (ranked 5th among Private Universities in Taiwan)

- Graduate Institute for Intellectual Property Rights (BA, MA)
- Law (BA, MA)

== Cooperative/Sister schools ==
Shih Hsin University's notable sister/cooperative schools include but are not limited to:

=== Japan ===
- Hiroshima University
- Ritsumeikan University
- Saitama University
- Kokugakuin University
- Meisei University
- Tsurumi University
- Meijo University
- Kansai University of International Studies
- Mejiro University
- Rissho University
- Prefectural University of Hiroshima
- Keisen University
- University of Shimane
- Tohoku Gakuin University
- Tohoko University of Community Service and Science

=== Korea ===
- Sungkyunkwan University
- SungKungHoe University
- Myeongji University
- Keimyung University
- Busan University of Foreign Studies
- Chung-Ang University
- Gimcheon University

=== Hong Kong ===
- The University of Hong Kong (library partnership)
- City University of Hong Kong
- Chu Hai College of Higher Education
- Hang Seng Management College

=== Malaysia ===
- One World Hanxing College of Journalism & Communication
- New Era University College
- Han Chiang University College of Communication
- Universiti Tunku Abdul Rahman
- In-House Multimedia College

=== Europe ===
- Griffith College
- Tomas Bata University in Zlín
- Roma Tre University
- Nicolaus Copernicus University
- University of Information Technology and Management in Rzeszów
- Lomonosov Moscow State University
- ISTC Strategies and Communications
- University of the West of England
- Liepaja University
- Pan-European University
- University of Presov

=== USA ===
- University of South Florida
- John Marshall Law School
- University of Missouri
- University of Kansas
- California State University at Fullerton
- California State University at Los Angeles
- Juniata College
- University of Wisconsin-River Falls
- Southern New Hampshire University
- Saginaw Valley State University
- State University of New York at Fredonia
- Chiao Hsin Chinese Language School
- Chi'ing Tsao School of Mandarin and Well-Being

=== Oceania ===
- Swinburne University of Technology

== Notable alumni ==
- Wu Rong-ming, politician
- Bianca Bai, model and actress
- Chen Chu, President of Control Yuan
- Claire Kuo, singer and television host
- Justin Chou, member of Legislative Yuan (2005–2012)
- Lai Shin-yuan, Minister of Mainland Affairs Council (2008–2012) and Chinese Taipei's representative to the World Trade Organization (2012–2016)
- Lee Chia-fen, educator and politician
- Lin Shu-fen, member of 7th, 8th and 9th Legislative Yuan
- Megan Lai, actress and singer
- Sandrine Pinna, actress
- Wang Shaw-lan, businessperson

== University presidents ==
- Chang Shewo (1956–1975)
- Hung Wei-pu (1975–1980)
- Chou Liang-yen (1980–1981)
- Chang Kai-yuan (1981–1990)
- Lin Nien-sheng (1990–1991)
- Cheng Chia-ling (1991–2001)
- Mu Tzunn-tsan (2001–2008)
- Lai Ting-ming (2008–2014)
- Wu Yung-chien (2014–present)

== Chorus ==
The Shih Hsin University Chorus was established on March 22, 1965. It offers scholastic performances, a Winter Music Camp, external performances in spring vacation, and annual performances in June.

== Transportation ==
=== Main campus ===
==== MRT ====
- Taipei Metro Wanfang Hospital station
- Taipei Metro Jingmei station
- Taipei Metro Dapinglin station
- Taipei Metro Guozikou station

=== Shanghai college ===
==== MRT ====
- Shanghai Metro Line 10/ Line 11 Jiaotong University station

== See also ==
- List of universities in Taiwan
- U9 League
