= Labor market segmentation =

Labor market segmentation is the division of the labor market according to a principle such as occupation, geography and industry.

One type of segmentation is to define groups "with little or no crossover capability", such that members of one segment cannot easily join another segment. This can result in different segments, for example men and women, receiving different wages for the same work. 19th-century Irish political economist John Elliott Cairnes referred to this phenomenon as that of "noncompeting groups".

A related concept is that of a dual labour market (DLM), that splits the aggregate labor market between a primary sector and a secondary sector.

== Neoclassical economics ==
The theory of labor market segmentation contrasts with neo-classical economic theory, which posits the existence of a unified market for labor, consisting of buyers and sellers in open competition. The labor market thus functions as do other markets. In this model, the difference between different workers' wages and conditions arise from individual differences in their human capital (skills, experience, or formal education) or tastes. On the latter, as part of the theory of compensating wage differentials, those who prefer risky or dirty jobs receive higher compensation than those who take safe or clean ones. Put another way, differences in compensation for labor arise only on the supply side.

The theory of labor market segmentation posits that differences on the demand side imply differences in compensation that are not explained by individual worker characteristics. Labor markets are not perfect markets. Non-market institutions such as craft unions and professional associations affect employer strategies, producing different results for workers with similar characteristics.

All workers should be subject to the same employment standards, such as minimum wages, maximum hour laws, occupational safety, security and health laws, regardless of sector.

== History ==
Modern labor market segmentation theory arose in the early 1960s. It changed the view of many economists who had seen the labor market as a market of individuals with different characteristics of e.g., education and motivation. This perspective was intended to help explain the demand-side of the market, and the nature and strategy of employers. The idea of non-competing groups developed under the general label of labor market segmentation theory. The theory emerged in the United States.

== Theory ==
The market segmentation model was developed to accommodate the differences in job markets. For example, lawyers and fashion designers work in different markets. Such markets arise from the division of labor, increasing differentiation and specialization. These workers are unable to switch between occupations because they require different skills and investment in training and qualifications. For example, nurses and doctors form separate occupational labor markets even though they work side by side in the same organizations.

Geographical labor markets emerge because of the costs and disruption workers incur in changing locations. As a result, wages for the same work can remain higher in some locations than others. Conversely, employers would incur costs and disruption if they attempted to relocate to an area of lower labor costs, and might experience increases in non-labor expenses. Cultural differences such as preferences for leisure time versus work may follow geography. As ever more work becomes transacted over digital networks, in some industries, geographical labor markets have become less relevant, and we have seen the rise of a so-called planetary labor market.

Geographical segmentation also occurs on a global basis, specifically between developed and less-dedeveloped countries. However, when labor migrates to developed countries, migrants tend to remain within their original segment, receiving less compensation than native workers. One study found that neoliberal globalization had expanded labor market segmentation. It found that in the West, nations import capital, consumer goods and services exported by countries in the rest of the world, where lower wage workers produce the exports.

=== Sectors ===
One important segmentation is primary/secondary (dual labour market). The two markets allow limited movement between them. The concepts of primary and secondary labor markets have now passed into conventional thought.

==== Primary sector ====
In a primary sector the workforce receives significant wages and benefits. The job market consists of a majority of blue collar and white collar jobs. The primary sector generally contains the higher-grade, higher-status, and better-paid jobs, with employers who offer the best terms and conditions. The primary sector is sometimes sub-divided into an upper and lower level.

==== Secondary sector ====
Secondary sector jobs are mostly low-skilled, require relatively little training, and can be learned relatively quickly on the job. Many such jobs feature high turnover, and/or variable demand. Employers are reluctant to invest in such workers, via advanced training or other employee development activities. Wages are low, and the terms and conditions of the job are less favorable.

The two key formulations are labor market theory and internal labor market theory. The labor market segmentation theory revolves around the identification of a split between two analytic divisions in the economy and the labor market.

== See also ==
- David Gordon
- Split labor market theory
- Flexicurity
