= Heliotropic hypothesis =

Concept about social systems

Heliotropic hypothesis is the process when social systems evolve toward the most positive images they hold of themselves.

== See also ==
- Management
- Self-image
- Social constructionism
- Social structure
- System dynamics
