= Social system =

Interrelationships between people, groups and institutions

In sociology, a social system is the patterned network of relationships constituting a coherent whole that exist between individuals, groups, and institutions. It is the formal structure of role and status that can form in a small, stable group. An individual may belong to multiple social systems at once; examples of social systems include nuclear family units, communities, cities, nations, college campuses, religions, corporations, and industries. The organization and definition of groups within a social system depend on various shared properties such as location, socioeconomic status, race, religion, societal function, or other distinguishable features.

== Notable theorists ==
The study of social systems is integral to the fields of sociology and public policy. Social systems have been studied for as long as sociology has existed.

=== Talcott Parsons ===
Talcott Parsons was the first to formulate a systematic theory of social systems, which he did as a part of his AGIL paradigm. He defined a social system as only a segment (or a "subsystem") of what he called action theory. Parsons organized social systems in terms of action units, where one action executed by an individual is one unit. He defines a social system as a network of interactions between actors. According to Parsons, social systems rely on a system of language, and culture must exist in a society in order for it to qualify as a social system. Parsons' work laid the foundations for the rest of the study of social systems theory and ignited the debate over what framework social systems should be built around, such as actions, communication, or other relationships.

=== Niklas Luhmann ===
Niklas Luhmann was a prominent sociologist and social systems theorist who laid the foundations of modern social system thought. He based his definition of a "social system" on the mass network of communication and defined society itself as an "autopoietic" system, meaning a self-referential and self-reliant system that is distinct from its environment. Luhmann considered social systems as belonging to three categories: interactions, organizations, and society as the encompassing social system. Luhmann also considered function systems, such as religion, law, art, education, science, etc., to be autopoietically closed systems. Organizations were defined as a network of decisions which reproduce themselves. Finally, interaction systems are systems that reproduce themselves on the basis of co-presence rather than decision making.

=== Jay Wright Forrester ===
Jay Wright Forrester founded the field of system dynamics, which deals with the simulation of interactions in dynamic systems. In his work on social systems, he discusses the possibilities of social system dynamics, or modeling social systems using computers with the aim of testing the possible effects of passing new public policies or laws. In his paper he recognized the difficulty of producing a reliable computer model system, but argued that an imperfect model was better than none and simply implementing new policy.

Forrester argued that unsuccessful public policies aim to treat the symptoms rather than the causes of social issues and that they also generally focus on efforts rather than on results. This occurs because there is either an incomplete understanding or a misunderstanding of the causes of an issue on the part of the policymakers, which often leads to ineffective or detrimental policies which aggravate the issues they were implemented to correct or cause other issues to arise. Another problem Forrester notes is that some policies which may work in the long run may aggravate an issue in the short run. A successful policy according to Forrester must target the correct leverage points, in this case the aspect of the social problem which, if modified, will produce a sizeable enough effect to correct the problem.

== Racialized social system ==
Eduardo Bonilla-Silva referred to the social relationships between different racial groups as a racialized social system. Some academics have criticized the idea that the group of white people constitute a meaningful group for such analysis. Iris Marion Young distinguished between the notions of "group" and "series", with a "group" being defined by one's own acknowledgment of being a member and a series being a passive social reality. Lewis argues that most groups of white people are a series rather in this sense rather than a group.

== Modeling ==
The problem with studying social systems is the difficulty of forming and testing theories; social systems are manipulated or controlled and large-scale systems cannot be reproduced in a lab setting. However, the rapid increase in the availability of digital data over the last decade gives scientists studying the behaviors of social systems very detailed and much more holistic pictures of how social systems respond to various events and how networked social systems behave. Additionally, the development and popularity of social media platforms such as Facebook and Twitter offer new ways to study the evolution of social systems and social networking behaviors with social graphs. Even though the behaviors of these systems may be surprising or not yet well understood, the digital age offers a new frontier for the study of social systems.

Notable past models are the WORLD2 and WORLD3 models: these both aimed to outline the world's distribution of resources. WORLD3 was based on the Club of Rome's Limits to Growth.

== See also ==
- Economic system – System of ownership, production and exchange
- Heliotropic hypothesis
- Political system – System of politics and government
- Social network – Social structure made up of a set of social actors
- Social rule system theory – Unification of social rule systems
- Social structure – Aggregate of patterned social arrangements in society
- Social systems theory (disambiguation)
- Social web – Social relations over the World Wide Web
- Society – Connected group of individuals
- Systems psychology – Branch of both theoretical and applied psychology
- Systems theory in anthropology
