= Meta-power =

Metapower is a concept of having control not simply of individuals, but of the social structures themselves. The idea has stemmed from work by sociologists such as Tom R. Burns and Peter Hall, the economist Thomas Baumgartner, as well as by political scientists such as James Rosenau and Stephen D. Krasner. Its study often uses the language of game theory since at some level, having meta-power over a group of people means that one can control the form of the game, thereby controlling the outcome.

== Background ==
Power and social control are typically conceptualized and investigated in terms of interpersonal or intergroup relationships in which one actor tries to get another to do something, usually against the latter's will. That is, power is on the level of interaction or relationships involving “situated contests between opposing actors”. The object of power is more or less direct behavioral control. Such an approach to the study of power captures only a part of the power activities of groups, organizations, and states.

A large, and historically more important part involves attempts to structure or re-structure the social and cultural matrix within which power activities are played out; such structuring may involve the manipulation of institutional arrangements, norms, and values. A given institutional or socio-cultural structure may be viewed as the macroscopic resultant of the application of structural or meta-power to determine permissible or acceptable activities and relationships of individuals and groups to one another and to resources or forms of property.

== Conceptualization ==
Since the mid-1970s there emerged a substantial body of work on meta-power or relational and structural control, that is control over social relationships and social structure, the structuring of interaction situations and conditions, for instance the opportunity structures of the actors, their payoff structures and incentive systems, and their orientations, beliefs, and norms vis a vis one another.

Although structural types of control have specific behavioral consequences and may be used as a means of behavioral control, the purpose of its exercise is generally the long-term structuring of institutional arrangements, key social processes and their outcomes: the individual and collective activities of those whose social relationships are structured. Structural control is used by social groups to ensure the effective functioning of a social system and/or to promote or stabilize their advantages or dominance over others. Among other things, it may be used to encourage cooperative social organization on the one hand, or to produce competition or conflict between actors on the other, and generally, to increase power in relation to others.

There are at least three bases of structural control with respect to such systems: control of action opportunities, control of differential payoffs or outcomes of interaction, and control of cultural orientations and ideology. That is, conditions of social action and interaction are structured with the result that certain social relationships and institutional arrangements are established and maintained.

In investigations of the exercise of meta-power, one is also interested in differences among actors in resources, skills, strategies, and so forth, but the main focus is on capacities to mobilize power resources to manipulate the matrix of rules or "the rules of the game," other conditions of interaction, and the distribution of resources as well as normative and ideological orientations. Meta-power entails the capacity to shape and set the limits of lower order power. Clearly, although an actor B may have social power within an interaction situation or "game" (e.g., greater ability than others to select a preferred outcome or to realize his will over the opposition of others within that social structural context (e.g., Dahl, Weber), actor B may or may not have power to structure social relationships, to alter the "type of game" the actors play, the rules and institutions and related conditions governing interactions or exchanges among the actors involved.

== The Case of Capitalist Systems ==
When one speaks of power in connection with capitalism, one typically thinks of the powers of the capitalists and their diverse lieutenants. But capitalist systems are characterized by structural forms of power, the exercise of meta-power and various forms of relational control. These systems operate to change the world, not only in material terms (production systems, products, infrastructures as well as depletion of resources, pollution of the environment, alteration of ecological systems) but in social and psychological terms (changing people’s levels of resources, their welfare; changing communities, occupations, lifestyles, cultural perspectives). Capitalist systems impact then not only on individuals, but communities, resource bases, and ecological systems. These are extraordinary powers shaping and reshaping human lives and destinies.

The multiple powers of capitalism is based on a complex of institutions, which are historical constructions of human agents: property regimes, production and distribution systems, managerial and accounting systems, finance and banking, etc. For Max Weber, possession of property and the lack of property are the basic characteristics of all class situations, but capitalism is more than property regimes, it involves enterprises with their management and control systems, the organization of markets, financial complexes, banks, etc. These entail powers and dis-powers; classes, capitalist owners (whether individuals or collectives), top managers, expert advisors; supervisors, foremen, workers, excluded and marginalized groups – as in the case of any institutional arrangement. There is systematic organized bias distinguishing classes of people in terms of possession of or access to powers in capitalist systems. And those lacking the means or access to the control functions of capitalism – or to the countervailing powers, for example, political—are subject to it.

The powers of capitalism not only impact on our lives in myriad ways but transform us, operating as an “external, in many ways invisible force” to which most of us are subject. Of course, there are also capitalist agents, what Marx and Engels referred to as the bourgeoisie (Karl Marx and Frederick Engels, The Communist Manifesto, 1848). Leading members of the bourgeoisie are powerful, but are nevertheless constrained to act in particular ways. They are driven by the pursuit of profit and competition, and they rapidly develop and improve instruments of production. “Through developing facilitated means of communication, they “draw all, even the most barbarian, nations into civilization. The cheap prices of commodities are the heavy artillery with which it [the bourgeoisie] forces the barbarians' intensely obstinate hatred of foreigners to capitulate. It compels all nations, on pain of extinction, to adopt the bourgeois mode of production; it compels them to introduce what it calls civilization into their midst, i.e., to become bourgeois themselves. In one word, it creates a world after its own image.”

== Basic Types ==
The operation of meta-power on a systemic level, for example, capitalism as a complex of meta-power, can be distinguished from that of particular agents, the bourgeoisie, for instance their positional structuring powers:

=== Structural meta-power ===
Structural meta-power shapes and constrains the social conditions of social agents, their interactions, their opportunities, and limitations. For instance, institutions and institutional arrangements such as those of capitalism and the state entail organizational bias, that shapes opportunities, that provides careers, status, income, limited power over others as well as constrains certain activities and developments. Rules, procedures, and programs generate patterns of social activities, effects, and developments. Institutional selection may operate, for instance, to change the frequency of certain activity patterns or to alter the distribution of resources (concentration, and centralization, e.g. through ratchet effects), to determine the parameters of power, the forms and types of games actors play. A system like capitalism entails generative processes of meta-power (based on accumulative processes which provide the resource base (material, knowledge, social, political) combined with knowledge development to set in motion new economic and socio-technical developments. Major socio-technical systems, once established, operate as legislative bodies shaping and reshaping human conditions.

=== Agential meta-power ===
Agential meta-power is where some agents shape particular structural conditions and institutional arrangements for other actors: to establish a constitution; to carry out substantial reforms, to restructure an industry, to transform social relationships and interaction opportunities and potentialities. The state launches projects, protects workers vis-à-vis their employers, supports (or blocks) the development of nuclear power, and outlaws certain chemicals, and, in general, regulates societal interactions with the environment.

Among the processes and developments in which meta-power researchers are interested, some involve powerful agents, for instance capitalist leaders, using their positions of structural power to mobilize resources in order to develop new systems of production, new products, new institutional arrangements, for example in the shaping of economic globalization. The initiatives may also come from state agencies, for example, to establish an infrastructure (airport, highway system, water system, electricity networks) or a regulatory agency; or, the initiative may come from a dominant political leader or party with a mandate (possibly presumed) to reform or transform social conditions. One or more agents is involved in mobilizing power resources for the purposes of launching a project(s), program(s), and institutional innovations. Such projects may be anticipated – or are experienced – by other agents as having positive and/or negative impacts, or possibly mixed consequences along with negative. Opposition may emerge and try to block or modify the project(s). This is part of the dialectics of meta-power and social change, as analyzed and illustrated in a number of works of dating back to the mid-1970s.
