= Horst Helle =

German sociologist (1934–2026)

Horst Jürgen Helle (19 July 1934 – 7 February 2026) was a German sociologist, who was Professor Emeritus at LMU Munich in Germany.

== Career ==
Helle received a business degree in his hometown at the University of Hamburg before receiving an MBA from the University of Kansas on a Fulbright Scholarship, from 1956 to 1957. Thereupon, he returned to the University of Hamburg and obtained the Ph.D. in sociology as well as the license to teach sociology as Privatdozent. He has since held tenured professorships at the RWTH Aachen University, the University of Vienna, and LMU Munich where, between 1973 and 2002, he was Professor of Sociology and Co-director of the Institute for Sociology. Over the course of his career, Helle also taught at universities in several other countries, including a year as a research fellow at the University of Chicago and, since 1996, in mainland China.

== Contributions to sociology ==
Helle's work is mainly concerned with analyzing the development of Symbolic Interactionism since Herbert Blumer, although he does not single out Blumer's contribution. Instead, the latter is positioned and discussed in the context of the evolution of the so-called 'Verstehen' tradition of interpretive sociology. Helle has specifically looked at the path taken by European sociology in its tension between positivism and neo-Kantianism since the writing of Georg Simmel. He connects this tradition to Blumer's indebtedness to George Herbert Mead, the widely acknowledged “father” of Symbolic Interactionism. In this theoretical continuity Helle also discusses the work of Anselm Strauss, Tamotsu Shibutani and, particularly, Erving Goffman. Most of Helle’s substantive work has centered on cultural change, religion, the family, and recently mainland China.

== Death ==
Helle died on 7 February 2026, at the age of 91.

== Selected bibliography ==
- Verstehende Soziologie und Theorie der Symbolischen Interaktion. Stuttgart: B. G. Teubner, 1977.
- Symbolic Interaction and Verstehen. Frankfurt am Main/New York: Peter Lang, 2005.
- Messages from Georg Simmel. Leiden: Brill, 2013.
- China: Promise or Threat? A Comparison of Cultures. Leiden: Brill, 2016.
- Refugees, Religions, and Social Change: Essays on China and the Failing West. Munich, 2019.
- Lebensrückblick als Dank: für die relevanten Anderen. Munich, 2024.
- Verstehende Soziologie: Entwicklung einer Vorgehensweise von Simmel bis Goffman. Munich, 2024.
