= Herbert Blumer =

American sociologist (1900–1987)

- Born: Herbert George Blumer; March 7, 1900; St. Louis, Missouri, U.S.
- Died: April 13, 1987 (aged 87); Danville, California, U.S.
- Spouses: Marguerite Barnett (m. 1922) Marcia Jackson (m. 1943)
- Children: 3

Academic background
- Education: University of Missouri (AB, MA); University of Chicago (PhD)
- Doctoral advisor: Ellsworth Faris
- Influences: George Herbert Mead, W. I. Thomas, Charles H. Cooley, Robert Park, Georg Simmel, John Dewey, Charles Ellwood

Academic work
- School or tradition: Chicago School of Sociology
- Institutions: American Sociological Association; University of Missouri; University of Chicago; University of California at Berkeley
- Main interests: Sociology, symbolic interactionism, sociological research methods
- Influenced: Erving Goffman, Anselm Strauss, Howard S. Becker, Tamotsu Shibutani

Herbert George Blumer (March 7, 1900 – April 13, 1987) was an American sociologist whose main scholarly interests were symbolic interactionism and methods of social research. Believing that individuals create social reality through collective and individual action, he was an avid interpreter and proponent of George Herbert Mead's social psychology, which he labeled symbolic interactionism. Blumer elaborated and developed this line of thought in a series of articles, many of which were brought together in the book Symbolic Interactionism. An ongoing theme throughout his work, he argued that the creation of social reality is a continuous process. Blumer was also a vociferous critic of positivistic methodological ideas in sociology.

== Life ==
Blumer was born March 7, 1900, in St. Louis, Missouri. He grew up in Webster Groves, Missouri, with his parents. He moved to Webster Groves with his family in 1905 onto a farm, but his father commuted to St. Louis every day to run a cabinet-making business. Blumer attended Webster Groves High School and later the University of Missouri from 1918 to 1922. Herbert Blumer was constantly being grounded in the world of economics and labor, insofar as having to drop out of high school to help his father's woodworking shop which was recovering from a fire. Moreover, during the summer, Blumer worked as a copy typist to pay for his college education. While studying undergraduate at the University of Missouri, Blumer was fortunate enough to work with Charles Ellwood, a sociologist, and Max Meyer, a psychologist. Ellwood was a University of Chicago alumnus (PhD 1899) who advised Blumer on his academic future.

Upon his graduation in 1921 with a bachelor's degree and in 1922 with a master's degree (both from the University of Missouri), Blumer secured a teaching position at the University of Missouri. Then, in 1925, he relocated to the University of Chicago, a university where he was greatly influenced by the social psychologist George Herbert Mead and sociologists W. I. Thomas and Robert Park. Upon completing his doctorate in 1928, he accepted a teaching position at the University of Chicago, where he continued his own research under Mead and became captivated with the prospects of examining the interactions between humans and the world. Blumer taught at this institution from 1927 to 1952.

Blumer was the secretary treasurer of the American Sociological Association from 1930 to 1935 and was the editor of the American Journal of Sociology from 1941 to 1952. In 1952, he moved from the University of Chicago and presided and developed the newly formed Sociology Department at the University of California, Berkeley. During World War II, he had a role as an arbitrator for the national steel industry, eventually becoming the chairman of the board of arbitration from 1945 until 1947. Blumer was appointed the first chair of the Department of Sociology at the University of California at Berkeley, a post he held until he retired in 1967. After his death, he was credited with establishing the reputation of the University of California at Berkeley Sociology Department by the 1960s. In 1952, he became the president of the American Sociological Association and he received the association's award for a Career of Distinguished Scholarship in 1983. Blumer served as the 46th president of the American Sociological Association and his Presidential Address was his paper "Sociological Analysis and the 'Variable'". Blumer was also elected as the president of the Society for the Study of Social Problems in 1954 and of the Pacific Sociological Society in 1971. He was said to be "the only white man whom Malcolm X trusted". With Emeritus Professor status until 1986, Blumer continued to be actively engaged in writing and research until shortly before his death on April 13, 1987.

=== Professional football career ===
Herb Blumer
Profile
- Position: Center / Guard / Tackle

Personal information
- Listed height: 6 ft 1 in (1.85 m)
- Listed weight: 200 lb (91 kg)

Career information
- High school: Webster Groves (MO)
- College: Missouri

Career history
- Chicago Cardinals (1925–1933)

Awards and highlights
- All-Pro (1929)
- Stats at Pro Football Reference

During much of the period that Blumer was at the University of Chicago from, 1925 through 1933, including all of the years that he was completing his doctorate, Blumer played football professionally for the Chicago Cardinals, now known as the Arizona Cardinals, a team in the National Football League. He had two career touchdowns both in the 1925 season. The first was in the 4th quarter of a game against the Milwaukee Badgers with a distance of under 3 yards. The second was in the second quarter of another game with against the Badgers which was 30+ yards in distance. Both touchdowns were via the quarterback, Red Dunn. Blumer played as an end, guard, and a series of other positions. He had 4 jersey numbers over the course of his career, numbers 8, 20, 17,15. During his first year of his doctorate, he also scored two touchdowns for the Cardinals. During that season, the Cardinals won the league championship, although that victory remains controversial due to the disqualification of the Pottsville Maroons, a team with a better record. Blumer was selected to the 1929 All-Pro Team. Blumer played 59 games over the course of his career and retired in 1933.

=== Offices held ===
- Chairman of the Board of Arbitration for the United States Steel Corporation and the United Steel Workers of America (1945–1947)
- Chief Liaison Officer of the Office of War Information in the State Department (during WWII)
- Head of the Department of Sociology and Social Institutions at the University of California, Berkeley (1952)
- President of the Society for the Study of Social Problems (1954)
- 46th ASA/American Sociological Association) President
- Pacific Sociological Society (1971)
- Chairman of the board of directors of Transaction

Awards

- Award for a Career of Distinguished Scholarship (1983)
- Berkeley Citation (1984)

== Intellectual contributions ==
=== Symbolic interactionism ===
Although Blumer devised the term symbolic interaction in 1937, the early development of this theoretical approach to social analysis is largely credited to the work of George Herbert Mead during his time at the University of Chicago. Blumer played a key role in keeping the tradition of symbolic interactionism alive by incorporating it into his teachings at the university. He presented his articles on symbolic interactionism in a single volume in which he conceptualized symbolic interaction into three main points:

- Humans act towards things (including other individuals) on the basis of the meanings they have for them.
  - There is a particular emphasis on the consciousness of actors as they interpret their actions.
  - It is important to recognize that the meaning or value of an object to one person may differ with another person- sociologists should not reduce human action to social rules and norms.
  - Blumer stresses this point because of the fear that our subjective meaning of our actions could be overshadowed by the norms and rules of society
- The meaning of things arises out of the social interactions one has with one's fellows.
  - The meaning of something is a social product, therefore it is not inherent in things.
- Meanings are handled in, and modified through, an interpretive process a person uses in dealing with the things he or she encounters.
  - Meanings are seen as a series of interpretive actions by the actor.
  - The actor gives objects meanings, act accordingly based on these meanings, and then revises the meanings to guide his future action.
  - The actor has an internal conversation with himself to determine the meanings, especially when encountering something out of the ordinary.

Blumer believed that what creates society itself is people engaging in social interaction. It follows then that social reality only exists in the context of the human experience. His theory of symbolic interaction, some argue, is thus closer to a theoretical framework (based on the significance of meanings and the interaction between individuals) than an applicable theory.

According to Blumer's theory, interaction between individuals is based on autonomous action, which in turn is based on the subjective meaning actors attribute to social objects and/or symbols. Thus individual actors regulate their behavior based on the meaning they attribute to objects and symbols in their relevant situation. Blumer theorized that assigning objects meaning is an ongoing, two-fold process. First, is the identification of the objects that have situational meaning. Second, is the process of internal communication to decide which meaningful object to respond to. Acknowledging that others are equally autonomous, individuals use their subjectively derived interpretations of others (as social objects) to predict the outcome of certain behaviors, and use such predictive insight to make decisions about their own behavior in the hopes of reaching their goal. Thus, when there is consensus among individual actors about the meaning of the objects that make up their situation, social coordination ensues. Social structures are determined as much by the action of individual actors as they determine the action of those individuals. Based on this, Blumer believed that society exists only as a set of potentials, or ideas that people could possibly use in the future.

This complex interaction between meanings, objects, and behaviors, Blumer reiterated, is a uniquely human process because it requires behavioral responses based on the interpretation of symbols, rather than behavioral responses based on environmental stimuli. As social life is a "fluid and negotiated process," to understand each other, humans must intrinsically engage in symbolic interaction. Blumer criticized the contemporary social science of his day because instead of using symbolic interactionism they made false conclusions about humans by reducing human decisions to social pressures like social positions and roles. Blumer was more invested in psychical interactionism that holds that the meanings of symbols are not universal, but are rather subjective and are "attached" to the symbols and the receiver depending on how they choose to interpret them.

=== Blumer's 3 types of objects ===
The importance of thinking to symbolic interactionists is shown through their views on objects. Blumer defined objects as the things "out there" in the world. The significance of objects is how they are defined by the actor. In other words, different objects have different meanings depending on the individual.

- Physical (a chair, a tree)
- Social (student, mother, friend)
- Abstract (ideas or moral principals)

=== Summary principles of symbolic interactionism ===
- Human beings are capable of thought.
- This capacity for thought is shaped by social interaction.
- We learn the meanings and the symbols through social interaction, exercising the human capacity for thought.
- These meanings and symbols provide the basis for distinctive human action and interaction.
- Modification of meanings and symbols occur through the interpretation of situations.
- Humans' capability of modification is due to their ability to interact with themselves.
- The intertwining of interaction and action make up groups and societies.

== Methodological contributions to sociology ==
According to Herbert Blumer, the most valid and desirable social research is conducted through qualitative, ethnographic methodology. He persistently critiqued the idea that the only form of valid knowledge is derived through a totally objective perspective. Blumer believed that theoretical and methodological approaches to studying human behavior must acknowledge human beings as thinking, acting, and interacting individuals and also must employ that they represent the humanly known, socially created, and experienced world. As this directly challenges the thought process of traditional, positivism-based approach to the sociological method, much controversy surrounds Blumer's sociological approach to empirical research.

Blumer believed that when positivistic methods were applied to social research, they created results that were ignorant to the empirical realities of the social world. Because people act towards the world based on the subjective meanings they attribute to different objects (symbolic interactionism), individuals construct worlds that are inherently subjective. Therefore, "objective" analysis is intrinsically subjugated to the researcher's own social reality, only documents the researchers own personal assumptions about social interaction, and ultimately yields biased findings. For a researcher to truly understand sociological phenomena, Blumer asserted, they must understand their subject's subjective interpretations of reality.

Following this logic, Blumer discounted social research that blindly applies methods that have been traditionally used in the natural sciences. Such quantitative, objective analysis, he argued, does not acknowledge the difference between humans and animals – specifically the difference in cognitive ability to consciously entertain opinions and to apply meanings to objects, both of which enabled humans to take an active role in shaping their world. Because society is composed of interactions between individuals or "joint actions/transactions", the only empirical reality is that which stems from human interaction. Therefore, contextual understanding of human action is intrinsic to valid social research.

Thus Blumer advocated for sociological research that sympathetically and subjectively incorporates the viewpoints of the subject, therefore pushing for a micro-sociological approach. Concluding that there is little validity in research that attempted to understand the social world objectively, Blumer felt that objective interpretations of society are intrinsically bias to the researchers social location and thus have little empirical value. To truthfully uncover the social realities of individuals different from one's self, an observer must be mindful of their framework and be open to different understandings of social reality.

=== Macrostructures and microstructures ===
Blumer believed that society is not made up of macrostructures, but rather that the essence of society is found in microstructures, specifically in actors and their actions. These microstructures are not isolated, but consist of the collective action of combination, giving rise to the concept of joint action. Joint action is not just the sum of individual actions, but takes on a character of its own. Blumer did not reject the idea of macrostructures, but instead focused on the concept of emergence, a concept that focuses on our larger social structures emerging from the smaller. Blumer admitted that macrostructures are important, but that they have an extremely limited role in symbolic interactionism. Therefore, he argued that macrostructures are a little more than "frameworks" within which the really important aspects of social life (action and interaction) take place. Moreover, according to Blumer, macrostructures are important because they shape the situations in which individuals act and supply to actors a certain set of symbols that allow them to act. Also, he did not deny systems such as culture and social order. In sum, Blumer said that large scale structures are the frameworks for what is crucial in society, action, and interaction. He is not denying that social structures influence our actions, just that they do not determine our actions.

=== Techniques Blumer advocated ===
Through Blumer's works and his focus on symbolic interactionism and methods of social research, he advocated modern techniques to aid people in further understanding society as well as the ability to navigate it. Blumer advocated direct observation of social life, interviewing and listening to people's conversations, listening to the radio and watching television, reading newspapers, reading diaries, letters, and other written life histories, reading public records, and finding well-informed participants. These techniques advocated by Blumer were seen as vital to help in people's understanding of society.

=== Sociological analysis and the "variable" ===
In 1952, Herbert Blumer became president of the American Sociological Association and his Presidential Address was his paper "Sociological Analysis and the 'Variable'". In this paper, Blumer addresses the shortcomings with variable analysis that he sees in social research. Herbert Blumer says, "there is a conspicuous absence of rules, guides, limitations, and prohibitions to govern the choice of variables." Overall, he felt that variable analysis needed to be looked at more carefully and precisely to see if the variables are correct and connected to the social research at hand.

Generic variables Blumer does not find generic:

- The frequent variable that stands for a class of object that is tied down to a given historical and cultural situation.
- Abstract sociological categories. Example- "social integration"
- Special set of class terms. Examples- "Age, time, authority"

Blumer believed these shortcomings are serious but not crucial, and that with increased experience they can be overcome. This address was meant to question how well variable analysis is suited to the study of human group life in its fuller dimensions.

=== Blumer's criticisms of Thomas and Znaniecki ===
In 1939, Blumer published Critiques of Research in the Social Sciences: An Appraisal of Thomas and Znaniecki's "The Polish Peasant in Europe and America", criticizing what, at the time, was a popular social theory. Blumer claimed that Thomas and Znaniecki failed to properly distinguish between attitude as subjective and value as a societal collective element. He said they used the terms interchangeably, therefore making the theory unreliable. It is difficult to disentangle subjective factors and objective correlates because the objective world is dealt with only to the extent that it enters subjective experiences. Blumer said,

This scheme declares that a value playing upon a pre-existing attitude gives rise to a new attitude, or an attitude playing upon a pre-existing value gives rise to a new value. With terms that are uncertain and not clearly disjunctive, the presumed causal relation becomes suspect.

In conclusion, Blumer recognized that in society there was no clear distinction between attitude and value, and that even social theorists have difficulty distinguishing between the two.

=== Collective behavior ===
Based on the work of Robert E. Park, Blumer, in a 1939 article, called to attention a new subfield of sociology: collective behavior. This now developed area of inquiry is devoted to the exploration of collective action and behavior that is not yet organized under an institutional structure or formation. Blumer was particularly interested in the spontaneous collective coordination that occurs when something that is unpredicted disrupts standardized group behavior. He saw the combination of events that follows such phenomena as a key factor in society's ongoing transformation.

=== Race prejudice ===
Blumer published an article discussing his theory on race based prejudice entitled "Race Prejudice as a Sense of Group Position" in a spring 1958 edition of The Pacific Sociological Review. This work described how race prejudice was represented by racial groups as a unit rather than as individual, often described as such in fields such as psychology. Blumer argued that the formation of racial prejudice was based on the creation of a dominant and subordinate groups and reproduced through these groups acting as units with prominent individuals in each speaking as representative of the whole. He outlined 4 characteristics of the dominant group that placed it in the position of domination. First, the group has feelings of superiority over another group. Next they define the subordinate group as alien and intrinsically different. They then harbor feelings of propriety and as such create areas of privilege or advantage for the group. Lastly, the dominant group creates fears and suspicions that the subordinate race has plans on the prerogatives of the dominant class.

Blumer continued his argument saying that the treatment of individuals in another group is less about the individuals themselves and more about the placement of the group the person is a part of. He goes on to describe the treatment of individuals in a different group as a matter of playing out the placement of the other group with the person in one group being a representative interacting with the representative of another group.

Next Blumer addresses the ways in which the dominant class defines and redefines the subordinate class. This he says is done in two major ways. One is by defining obviously through complex interaction and communication how the dominant class feels about the subordinate one. This takes the form of conversations with other members of the dominant group via things like gossip about the subordinate group. The other way in which the subordinate class is redefined is through treating the subordinate group and the members that make it up as abstract entities depersonalizing their existence. This abstractionism of the subordinate group has four major implications as outlined by Blumer. The first is that the abstracted group is built up in remote areas outside of daily interactions and enforced through legislative means. Second, specific things regarding the subordinate group are highlighted as profound events that define the subordinate class, these processes playing out again in a context outside of daily interactions. Third, key public figures, like celebrities, spread the messaging of the dominant group. Lastly, the dominant class enforces the stereotypes spread so as to receive specific privileges.

Blumer finishes his argument about prejudice with two final notes about the nature of it. He theorizes that prejudice crumbles and loses its former power when the messaging of the dominant group is no longer being persistently enforced. Conversely, he advises that prejudice arises from periods of disorganization which result in the use of a subordinate class as a scapegoat.

== Relationship with George Herbert Mead ==
Blumer is well known for his connection with George Herbert Mead. Blumer was a follower of Mead's social-psychological work on the relationship between self and society, and Mead heavily influenced Blumer's development of Symbolic Interactionism. Mead transferred the subject field of social psychology to Blumer's sociology. One important aspect Blumer learned from Mead was that in order for us to understand the meaning of social actions, we must put ourselves in others' shoes to truly understand what social symbols they feel to be important. However, Blumer also deviated from Mead's work. Blumer was a proponent of a more micro-focused approach to sociology and focused on the subjective consciousness and symbolic meanings of individuals.

== Influence of Charles Ellwood ==
Blumer's initial interest in social interactionism came from his thesis advisor at Missouri, Charles Ellwood. Ellwood's thesis, "Theory of Social Revolutions" (1922), ignited a passion for social psychological dynamics that persisted throughout Blumer's life. Ellwood introduced Blumer to others such as John Dewey and George Herbert Mead. Similar to George Mead, sociologist Charles Ellwood also influenced the development of Herbert Blumer and symbolic interactionism. There are four prominent areas where Ellwood's ideas can be found in both Blumer's work and symbolic interactionism: interactionism, methodology, emotions, and group behavior. The concepts of "interstimulation and response," "intercommunication," and "coadaptation" function in Ellwood's social psychology in the same way that "self-indications" and "interpretations" are found in Blumer's symbolic interactionism. There are six areas where Ellwood and Blumer are similar when addressing methodology: studying human behavior in context, a disdain for the physical science method, understanding the people being studied, using sociology to assist humanity, using inductive reasoning, and avoiding hypotheses. Looking at their ideas on emotion, both Ellwood's and Blumer's ideas deal with the relationship between emotion and interaction, with Ellwood stating, "all our social life and social behavior are not only embedded in feeling, but largely guided and controlled by feeling." Similar to that, Blumer states that, "feeling is intrinsic to every social attitude." Both Ellwood and Blumer were social nominalists and positioned that reality is reduced to properties of individuals and their interrelations.

== Scholarly critiques of Blumer ==
Many have argued that Blumer's theory is a simplified and distorted version of Mead's. Many contemporary positions see "Blumerian interactionism" as "old hat," because it is gender blind (as argued by feminists) and is too conservative. In Blumers study "Movies and Conduct" (1933), Blumer made a contribution to sociology by developing an observational methodology that relied on a cinematic sense of vision and was known as symbolic interactionism. By eliminating all references to the visual erotic that made up early cinema, as well as the psychoanalytic interpretation of the subject, this paradigm claimed a scientific objectivity for social observation. Due to this, a study through feminist film study claims Blumer's methodology presents itself as "sexless." It is also contested that symbolic interaction needs to adopt an agenda that takes race, class and gender into consideration more. Moreover, it is argued that the social constructionist perspective of Blumerian interactionism provides an "over-socialized" account of human life, and downplays and ignores our unconscious.

=== Theory of symbolic interaction ===
Blumer's theory of symbolic interaction, although fascinating, received criticism on its subjectivity and emphasis on different aspects of society. His theory was said to be too subjective and that it had too much emphasis on day-to-day life and the social formation of the individual while ignoring social structure. Further criticism based on its disregard of social structure, said symbolic interactionism deflects attention away from the impact social structures have on individual behavior. These social structures being things such as the state, culture, and the economy. Symbolic interaction was also said to tend to ignore class relations and the restraints brought about by differing social classes. Blumer himself was at fault, in some part, for criticism because he refused advice to include substantive papers in his book. He wanted to restrict the volume to more general topics which caused a large amount of criticism.

=== Perspective of empirical research ===
- Methodological contributions are hard to implement in practice
- Since Blumer rejected the behaviorist approach to the study of meaning, societal research within a symbolic interactionist framework poses empirical challenges

== Applications of Blumer's theories ==
=== Blumer and the DBO model ===
Reza Azarian uses Herbert Blumer's concept of the definition of the situation to improve the already-existing framework of the Desire-Belief-Opportunity model of Analytic Sociology. This work seeks to create a more empirical base for the DBO model to operate upon. Since Analytic Sociology stresses the individual, just as Blumer stresses the acting unit, Azarian writes that Blumer's framework can aid in determining the actor's perception and set of actions in response to a situation. The DBO model is mainly criticized for lacking analytical specification and empirical validation.

=== Blumer and collective emotion ===
Ashley Reichelmann connects Blumer's GPT (Group Position Theory) and views on perceived, prejudiced threat to the current studies on racial threat. Reichelmann demonstrates how experimental research design and quantitative measure can be used to capture threats as Blumer outlines them. She illustrates that collective threat is distinct from other collective emotions, using factor analyses and regression, and operates according to Blumer's theoretical predictions. Reichelmann writes that there is a gap between Blumer's framework and the methodologies of current sociologists and hopes that the use of Blumer's ideas will bridge the gap by identifying current tensions as a type of collective emotion.

== Works ==
- Movies, Delinquency, and Crime (1933)
- Movies and Conduct. New York, Macmillan and Company (1933)
- Critiques of Research in the Social Sciences: An Appraisal of Thomas and Znaniecki's "The Polish Peasant in Europe and America" (1939). New York : Social Sciences Research Council
- Mind, Self, and Society: From the Standpoint of a Social Behaviorist (1967)
- Symbolic Interactionism: Perspective & Method (1986)
- Industrialization as an Agent of Social Change: A Critical Analysis (1990)
