= Social rule system theory =

Unification of social rule systems

Social rule system theory is an attempt to formally approach different kinds of social rule systems in a unified manner. Social rules systems include institutions such as norms, laws, regulations, taboos, customs, and a variety of related concepts and are important in the social sciences and humanities. Social rule system theory is fundamentally an institutionalist approach to the social sciences, both in its placing primacy on institutions and in its use of sets of rules to define concepts in social theory.

== Overview ==
Social rule system theory notes that most human social activity is organized and regulated by socially produced and reproduced systems of rules. These rules have a tangible existence in societies – in language, customs and codes of conduct, norms and laws, and in social institutions such as family, community, market, business enterprises, and government agencies. Thus, this theory posits that the making, interpretation, and implementation of social rules are universal in society, as are their reformulation and transformation.

Human agents (individuals, groups, organizations, communities, and other collectivities) produce, carry, and reform these systems of social rules, and this frequently takes place in ways they neither intend nor expect. This does not mean that social rule systems do not change. They can and do, and that change can be endogenous and exogenous to the society. The implementation of rules – and the maintenance of some order – always calls for cumulative experience, adjustment, adaptation, etc. In such ways, normative and institutional innovation is generated. There is a continual interplay – a dialectic, if you will – between the regulated and the unregulated.

What is more, at the same time that social rule systems strongly influence actions and interactions, they are formed and reformed by the actors involved. Human agency is manifest in this dialectical process, played out by participating actors having their specific competencies and endowments, their situational analyses, interpretations, and strategic responses to immediate pushes and pulls to which they are subject.

== History ==
The development of a more systematic conceptualization and theorizing about social rules and systems of social rules emerged in the late 1970s in the collaborative work of Thomas Baumgartner, Tom R. Burns, Philippe DeVille, and later Helena Flam, Reinier de Man, Atle Midttun, Anders Olsson, and others. Its formalization stemmed from a number of articles in the early 1980s.

Social theory concepts such as norm, value, belief, role, social relationship, and institution as well as game were shown to be definable in a uniform way in terms of rules and rule complexes. Rules and rule configurations may be treated as mathematical objects (the mathematics is based on contemporary developments at the interface of mathematics, logic, and computer science. Rules may be imprecise, possibly inconsistent, and open to a greater or lesser extent to modification and transformation by the participants.

Rules are key concepts in the new institutionalism, in several variants of socio-cultural evolutionary theory, and in work in semiotics, linguistics, and philosophy on “language games”. Among the many other researchers developing and applying rule concepts in the social sciences. In general, much of the use of rule concept in the social sciences and humanities has been informal and even metaphorical, with the major exception of Chomsky.

== Social rules and the patterning of action ==
Social rule systems are used to examine all levels of human interaction. They provide more than potential constraints on action possibilities. They also generate opportunities for social actors to behave in ways that would otherwise be impossible, for instance, to coordinate with others, to mobilize and to gain systematic access to strategic resources, to command and allocate substantial human and physical resources, and to solve complex social problems by organizing collective actions. In guiding and regulating interaction, social rules give behavior recognizable, characteristic patterns, and make such patterns understandable and meaningful for those who share in the rule knowledge.

=== Culture and institutional arrangements ===
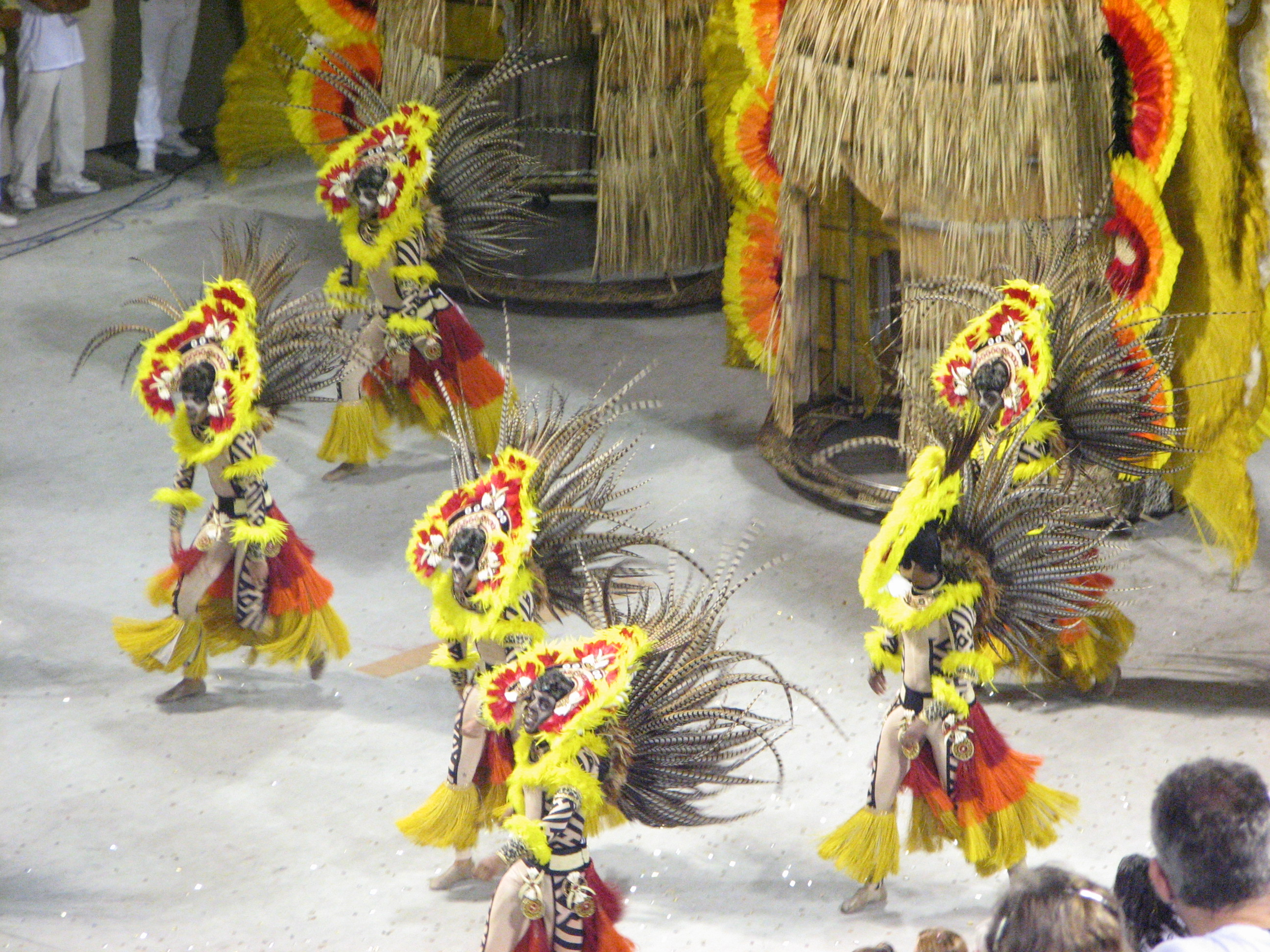
The Brazilian Carnival parade in Rio de Janeiro is given meanings through shared understanding of culturally defined rules.

On the macro-level of culture and institutional arrangements, rule system complexes are examined: language, cultural codes and forms, institutional arrangements, shared paradigms, norms and “rules of the game”. On the actor level, one refers to roles, particular norms, strategies, action paradigms, and social grammars (for example, procedures of order, turn taking, and voting in committees and democratic bodies). There are not only role grammars but semantics and pragmatics. There are processes of meaning, interpretation, and adaptation associated with rule application and implementation.

Grammars of action are associated with culturally defined roles and institutional domains, indicating particular ways of thinking and acting. In that sense, the grammars are both social and conventional. For instance, in the case of gift giving or reciprocity in defined social relationships, actors display a competence in knowing when a gift should be given or not, how much it should be worth, or, if one should fail to give it or if it lies under the appropriate value, what excuses, defenses and justifications might be acceptable. Someone ignorant of these rules, e.g. a child or someone from a totally different culture would obviously make mistakes (for which they would probably be excused by others). Similarly, in the case of "making a promise," rule knowledge indicates under what circumstances a promise may or may not legitimately be broken – or at least the sort of breach of a promise that might be considered acceptable. In guiding and regulating interaction, the rules give behavior recognizable, characteristic patterns rules should be adhered to as it should be.

To varying degrees actors collectively produce and reproduce patterns of appropriate or acceptable possibilities. This can be conceptualized and mathematically developed as an ideal point or collection of "approximations". Thus, a community of actors sharing a rule complex recognize a wide variety of varying performances of a given rule as a family of resemblances, or "the same thing.” Both in this sense – and in the sense that social rules are never learned identically and undergo different rates of adaptation and change over time – the concept of rule, and of culture generally, is distributive. – making the patterns understandable and meaningful for those sharing in the rule knowledge.

Shared rules are the major basis for knowledgeable actors to derive, or to generate, similar situational expectations. They also provide a frame of reference and categories, enabling participants to readily communicate about and to analyze social activities and events. In such ways, uncertainty is reduced, predictability is increased. This is so even in complex situations with multiple actors playing different roles and engaging in a variety of interaction patterns. As Harre and Secord (1972:12) point out, “It is the self-monitoring following of rules and plans that we believe to be the social scientific analogue of the working of generative causal mechanisms in the processes which produce the non-random patterns studied by natural scientists.”

=== Cognitive processes ===
Social rule systems play then an important role in cognitive processes, in part by enabling actors to organize and to frame perceptions in a given institutional setting or domain. On the basis of a more or less a common rule system, questions such as the following can be intersubjectively and collectively answered:

- what is going on in this situation;
- what kind of activity is this;
- who is who in the situation, what specific roles are they playing;
- what is being done; why is this being done?

The participating actors can understand the situation in intersubjective ways. In a certain sense, they can simulate and predict what will happen in the interactions on the basis of the applied rules. Hence, rule systems provide not only a basis for interpretative schemes but also the concrete basis for actors to plan and judge actions and interactions.

Social rules are also important in normative and moral communications about social action and interaction. Participants refer to the rules in giving accounts, in justifying or criticizing what is being done (or not done), in arguing for what should or should not be done, and also in their social attribution of who should or should not be blamed for performance failures, or credited with success. Actors also exploit rules when they give accounts in order to try to justify certain actions or failures to act, as part of a strategy to gain legitimacy, or to convince others that particular actions are "right and proper" in the context.

=== Textually encoded social rules ===
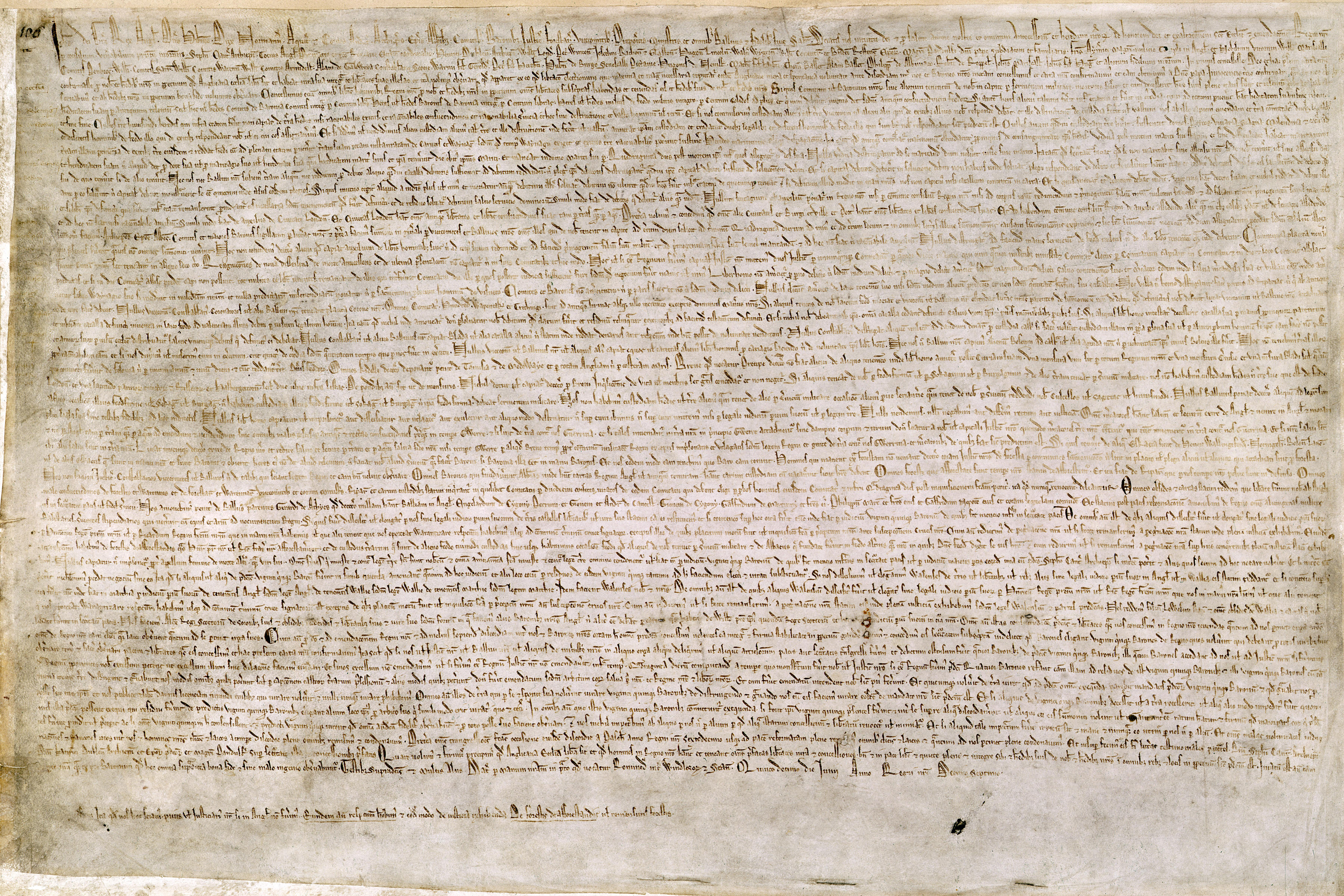
The Magna Carta from 1215 is an early English form of encoded social and legal rules.

So called formal rules are found in sacred books, legal codes, handbooks of rules and regulations, or in the design of organizations or technologies that an elite or dominant group seeks to impose in a particular social setting. For instance, a formal organization such as a bureaucracy consists of, among other features, a well-defined hierarchical authority structure, explicit goals and policies, and clear-cut specialization of function or division of labor.

Informal rules appear less "legislated" and more "spontaneous" than formal rules. They are generated and reproduced in ongoing interactions. The extent to which the formal and informal rule systems diverge or contradict one another varies. Numerous organizational studies have revealed that official, formal rules are not always those that operate in practice. In some cases the informal unwritten rules not only contradict formal rules but take precedence over them under some conditions. Informal rules emerge for a variety of reasons. In part, formal rules fail to completely specify action (that is provide complete directions) or to cover all relevant (or emergent) situations.

The situations (in which rules are applied or implemented) are particularistic, even idiosyncratic, whereas formal rules of behavior are more or less general. In some situations (especially emergent or new situations), actors may be uncertain or disagree about which rules apply or about the ways in which to apply them. They engage in situational analyses and rule modification, or even rule innovation out of which emerge informal rules (which may be formalized later).

=== Interpretation and variability ===
However strongly actions are patterned by rules, social life is sufficiently complex that some imagination and interpretation are required in applying rules to a specific action and interaction context. Imagination generates variability in action from actor to actor, and even for a given actor over time.

Rules are also interpreted in their application. Even highly formalized, systematic rules such as laws and written rules of bureaucracy are never complete in their specification. They have to be interpreted and applied using situational information and knowledge. Adaptations and improvisations are common, even in the most formally organized institutions. In this sense, rules are generative, and their interpretation and implementation more or less context-dependent.

Interpretation varies across a population sharing a rule system, and also across time. In addition, rules will sometimes be learned or implemented with error, providing in some cases an incorrect model for others. Both of these factors result in variability. Moreover, if an action at deviance with cultural rules or standard interpretations is perceived by other actors as advantageous, it may be copied, thus spreading what becomes a new cultural variant.

== Adherence to and compliance with social rules ==
Actors adhere to and implement rule and rule systems to varying degrees. Compliance with, or refusal to comply with, particular rules are complicated cognitive and normative processes. Typically, there are diverse reasons for rule compliance. Several of the most important factors are:

1. Interest factors and instrumentalism (stressed by public choice and Marxist perspectives on self-interested behavior). Actors may advocate rules to gain benefits or to avoid losses.
2. Identity and status. Adherence to rules – and commitment to their realization – may be connected to an actor's identity, role, or status, and the desire to represent self as identified by or committed to particular rules. It follows that a major motivation in maintaining (or changing rules) – e.g. role complexes or distributive rules – is to maintain or change their social status.
3. Authoritative Legitimacy and Sacrality. Many rules are accepted and adhered to because persons or groups with social authority have defined or determined them, possibly by associating them with sacred principles or identifying their causal or symbolic relationship to actors' interests and status. In the contemporary world, we find the widespread institutionalization of abstract meta-rules of compliance that orient people to accepting particular definitions of reality and rule systems propagated by socially defined and often certified authorities, e.g. scientists and other experts. The authority may be scientific, religious, or political (for instance in the latter case, the fact that a democratic agency has determined the rules according to right and proper procedures). Certain rules may even be associated with God, the sacred, and, in general, those beings or things that actors stand in awe of, have great respect for, and may associate with or share in their charisma by adhering to or following their rules.
4. Normative/Cognitive Order. Actors may follow rules – and try to ensure that others follow them – because the rules fit into a cognitive frame for organizing their perceptions and making sense of what is going on. People react negatively to deviance – even in cases where they are not directly affected (that is, there are no direct apparent self-interests), because the order is disturbed, potentially destabilized, and eroded.
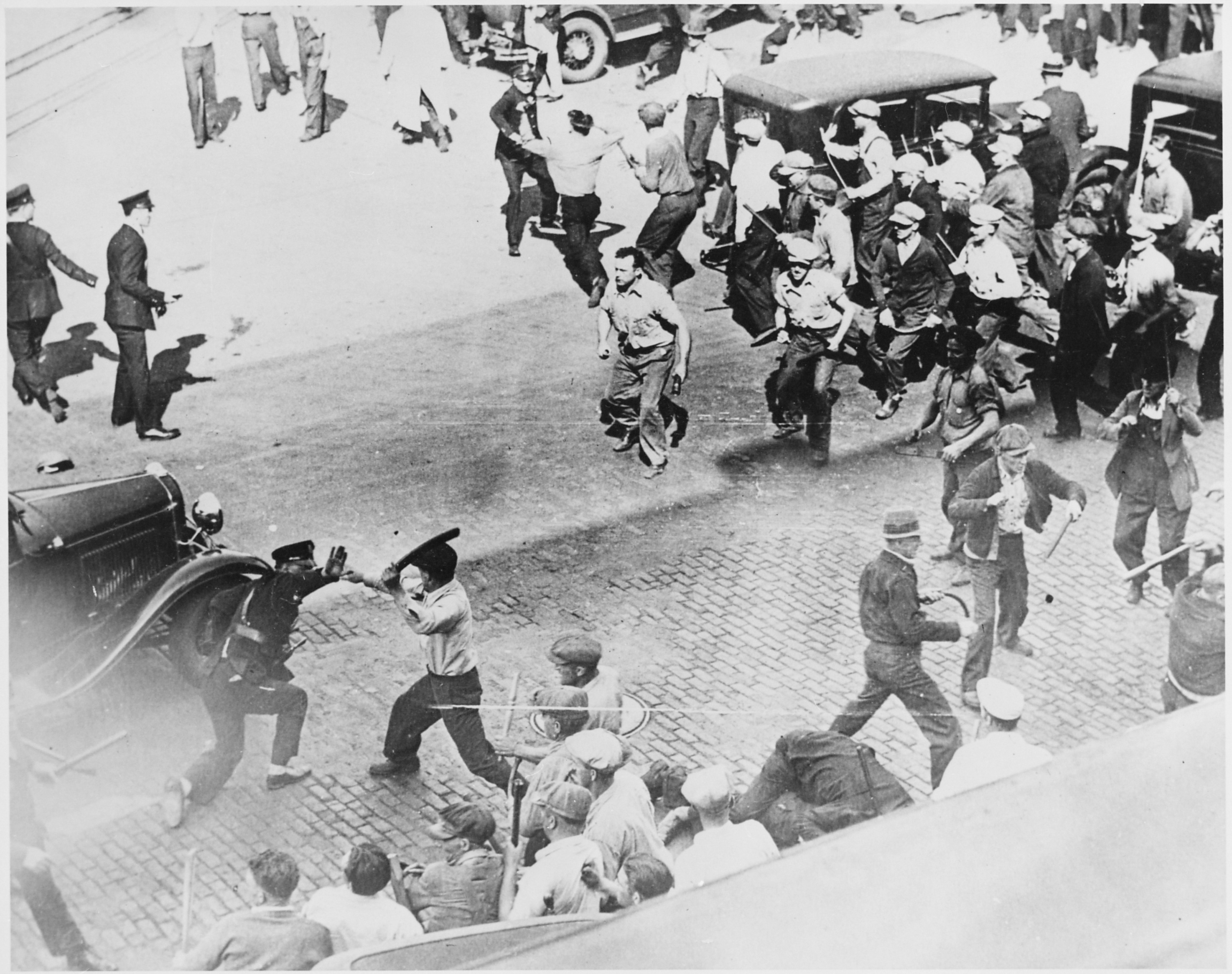
  Teamsters clash with riot police in the Minneapolis Teamsters Strike of 1934. Both groups use various methods to assure compliance with institutional rules.
5. Social sanctions. Laws and formal organizational rules and regulations are typically backed up by specific social sanctions and designated agents assigned the responsibility and authority to enforce the rules. There are a variety of social controls and sanctions in any social group or organization which are intended to induce or motivate actors to adhere to or follow rules, ranging from coercion to more symbolic forms of social approval or disapproval, persuasion, and activation of commitments (in effect, "promises" that have already been made). In order to gain entrance or to remain in the group, one must comply with key group rules and role definitions. Exclusion from the group, if there are no alternative groups, becomes a powerful sanction.
6. Inherent sanctions. Many rules, when adhered to in specific action settings, result in gains or payoffs that are inherent in following those rules, such as going with (or against) automobile traffic. In many cases, the reasons for compliance are consequentialist. As many social scientists point out: in automobile traffic, we adhere to or accept as right and proper traffic rules, in particular those relating to stopping, turning, etc. because without them, we recognize that the situation would be chaotic, dangerous, even catastrophic. Most technical rules, for example relating to operating machines or using tools, entail inherent sanctions. Following them is necessary (or considered necessary) for the proper functioning or performance of the technology, or achieving a certain desirable outcome or solution.
7. veil of ignorance. Actors may not know the consequences of rule compliance and follow rules because they are given, taken for granted, or believed generally to be right and proper. The benefits of adhering to some rule systems can, however, mask hidden costs.
8. Habits, routines, and scripts. Much rule-following behavior is unreflective and routine. Many social rules are unverbalized, tacit, that is, part of a collective subconscious of strategies, roles, and scripts learned early in life or career, and reinforced in repeated social situations, for instance sex roles, or even many professional roles. Human beings acquire and learn cultural rules and roles – in part through being taught, in part through observing and learning the patterns generated by others (that is, both through verbal and non-verbal communication). Of particular importance is the fact that rule systems learned in early socialization are associated with very basic values and meanings – even personal and collective identity – motivating at a deep emotional level commitment to the rules and a profound personal satisfaction in enacting them. Conformity is then a matter of habitual, unreflected and taken-for-granted ways of doing things.

As indicated above, some social rules are enforced, others not: indeed, rules can be distinguished on the basis of the degree to which, and the circumstances under which, they are socially enforced or enforceable. Of course, regardless of the degree of enforceability, they may be complied with because of a desire for order, intrinsic sanctions, or realizing one’s role and self-identity. Many rules that actors rigorously adhere to are not socially enforceable, but nevertheless actors utilize them in organizing social activities and in shaping social order. Harre and Secord (1972:17) emphasize the freedom of choice in relation to rules and roles:

"The mechanistic model is strongly deterministic; the role-rule model is not. Rules are not laws, they can be ignored or broken, if we admit that human beings are self-governing agents rather than objects controlled by external forces, aware of themselves only as helpless spectators of the flow of physical causality."

== Social rule system theory and complex institutional arrangements ==
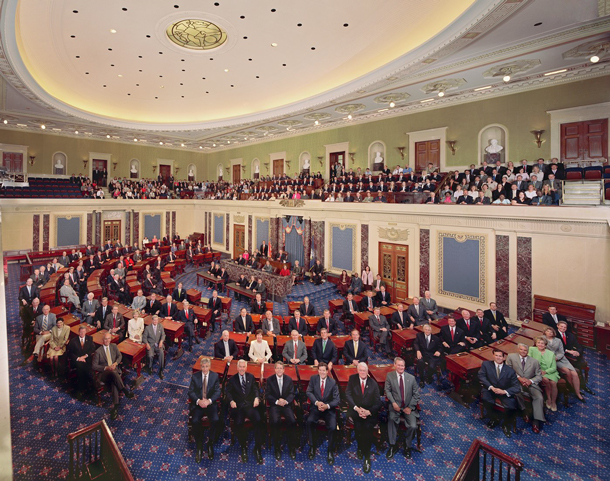
A regular legislative senate is a complex institutional arrangement.

On meso- and macro-levels of analysis, social rule system theory is applied to the description and analysis of institutions such as bureaucracy, markets, political systems, and science – major orders in modern societies. This entails more than a study of social structure, or a contribution to neo-institutionalism.

It is a theory that analyses the links between social structure in the form of particular institutional arrangements including role relationships, on the one hand, and social action and social interaction, on the other. The theory shows, for example, in what ways markets and bureaucracies are organized and regulated by social rules at the same time that actors, both inside and outside these institutions, maintain or change the organizing principles and rules through their actions and interactions. The actors involved in a given institution use their institutional knowledge of relationships, roles, norms, and procedures to guide and organize their actions and interactions. But they also use it to understand and interpret what is going on, to plan and simulate scenarios, and to refer to in making commentaries and in giving and asking for accounts. Rule system theory stresses rule-based cognitive processes such as framing, contextualizing, and classifying objects, persons, and actions in a relevant or meaningful way (Carson, 2004).

In general, the cultural complex of rule systems contributes to making social life more or less orderly and predictable and solves problems of "existential uncertainty" within the group, organization, or community bearing and adhering to the rule culture. As suggested earlier, however, there is always a tension and a dynamic between the regulated and the unregulated, order and disorder (this is also pointed up in empirical studies. It also considers the production of appropriate or meaningful accounts, discourses, and commentaries in the context of the given institution.

In line with the new institutionalism, social rule system theory stresses that particular institutions and their organizational instantiations are deeply embedded in cultural, social, and political environments and that particular structures and practices are often reflections of as well as responses to rules, laws, conventions, paradigms built into the wider environment.

== Rule system change and evolution ==
Institutional change entails changes in particular rule complexes and/or enforcement activities to the effect that new or deviant patterns of action and interaction are generated and encouraged. Social rule system theorists point to three major power mechanisms of rule system reproduction and change to explain the evolution of social rule systems and institutional arrangements: the selective action of the environment; the constraining and facilitating conditions of institutional arrangements with their technologies, available resources, and participants; and creative/destructive human agency.

Selective environments operate to bring about the successes of some rule structures and the failure of others and, thereby, shifts in the prevalence of different forms. Rule system changes may be also initiated by social agents. For instance, an elite "legislates" an institutional change, or a social movement brings about change through coming to direct power or effectively pressuring and negotiating with an established power elite. Changes are also brought about through more dispersed processes, e.g. where one or more agents of a population discover a new technical or performance strategy and others copy the strategy, and, in this way, the rule innovation diffuses through social networks of communication and exchange.

The introduction by social agents of new rules and their expression in transformed patterns of action or in innovative physical artifacts – such as technologies and socio-technical infrastructures – is a major part of institutional change and evolution. In other words, institutionalized changes may be brought about by the "selective forces" of social as well as physical environments or by the direct action of social agents. This model of change is applicable to economic, political, administrative, socio-technical, and scientific institutional arrangements.
