= Social reality =

Distinct from biological reality or individual cognitive reality

Social reality refers to a socially constructed perspective of the world, consisting of the accepted social tenets of a community involving laws and social representations. It is distinct from the material reality, biological reality or individual cognitive reality, representing as it does on a subjective level created through social interaction and thereby transcending individual motives and actions. Radical constructivism would cautiously describe social reality as the product of uniformities among observers (whether or not including the current observer themselves).

== Schütz, Durkheim, and Spencer ==
The problem of social reality has been treated exhaustively by philosophers in the phenomenological tradition, particularly Alfred Schütz, who used the term "social world" to designate this distinct level of reality. Within the social world, Schütz distinguished between social reality that could be experienced directly (umwelt) and a social reality beyond the immediate horizon, which could yet be experienced if sought out. In his wake, ethnomethodology explored further the unarticulated structure of our everyday competence and ability with social reality.

Previously, the subject had been addressed in sociology as well as other disciplines. For example, Émile Durkheim stressed the distinct nature of "the social kingdom. Here more than anywhere else the idea is the reality". Herbert Spencer had coined the term super-organic to distinguish the social level of reality above the biological and psychological.

== Searle ==
John Searle has used the theory of speech acts to explore the nature of social/institutional reality, so as to describe such aspects of social reality which he instances under the rubrics of "marriage, property, hiring, firing, war, revolutions, cocktail parties, governments, meetings, unions, parliaments, corporations, laws, restaurants, vacations, lawyers, professors, doctors, medieval knights, and taxes, for example".

Searle argued that such institutional realities interact with each other in what he called "systematic relationships (e.g., governments, marriages, corporations, universities, armies, churches)" to create a multi-layered social reality.

For Searle, language was the key to the formation of social reality because "language is precisely designed to be a self-identifying category of institutional facts"; i.e., a system of publicly and widely accepted symbols which "persist through time independently of the urges and inclinations of the participants."

== Objective/subjective ==
There is a debate in social theory about whether social reality exists independently of people's involvement with it, or whether (as in social constructionism) it is only created by the human process of ongoing interaction.

Peter L. Berger argued for a new concern with the basic process of the social construction of reality. Berger stated that the social construction of reality was a process made up of three steps: externalization, objectivation and internalization. In similar fashion, post-Sartrians like R. D. Laing stress that, "once certain fundamental structures of experience are shared, they come to be experienced as objective entities...they take on the force and character of partial autonomous realities, with their own way of life". Yet at the same time, Laing insisted that such a socially real grouping "can be nothing else than the multiplicity of the points of view and actions of its members...even where, through the interiorization of this multiplicity as synthesized by each, this synthesized multiplicity becomes ubiquitous in space and enduring in time".

The existence of a social reality independent of individuals or the ecology would seem at odds with the views of perceptual psychology, including those of J. J. Gibson, and those of most ecological economics theories.

Scholars such as John Searle argue on the one hand that "a socially constructed reality presupposes a reality independent of all social constructions". At the same time, he accepts that social realities are humanly created, and that "the secret to understanding the continued existence of institutional facts is simply that the individuals directly involved and a sufficient number of members of the relevant communities must continue to recognize and accept the existence of such facts".

== Socialisation and the Capital Other ==
Freud saw a child's induction into social reality as consolidated with the passing of the Oedipus complex and the internalisation of the parents: "the same figures who continue to operate in the super-ego as the agency we know as conscience...also belong to the real external world. It is from there that they were drawn; their power, behind which lie hidden all the influences of the past and of tradition, was one of the most strongly-felt manifestations of reality".

Lacan clarified the point by stressing that this was "a highly significant moment in the transfer of powers from the subject to the Other, what I call the Capital Other...the field of the Other – which, strictly speaking, is the Oedipus complex". Lacan considered that "the Oedipus complex...superimposes the kingdom of culture on that of nature", bringing the child into the Symbolic Order.

Within that order, Lacanians consider that "institutions, as signifying practices, are much more extensive structures than romantic notions allow and they thus implicate us in ways which narrower definitions cannot recognize...exceed any intersubjective intention or effect". In similar fashion, Searle asserts that "institutional power – massive, pervasive, and typically invisible – permeates every nook and cranny of our social lives...the invisible structure of social reality".

== Measuring trust ==
If one accepts the validity of the idea of social reality, scientifically, it must be amenable to measurement, something which has been explored particularly in relation to trust. "Trust is...part of a community's social capital, as Francis Fukuyama argues, and has deep historical and cultural roots".

Theories of the measurement of trust in the sociological community are usually called theories of social capital, to emphasize the connection to economics.

== See also ==
- Belief
- Ideology
- Consensus Reality, a notion of reality based on consensus view
- Sociology of gender
- Social identity theory
- Social construction of gender
- Social ontology
- Sociology of human consciousness
