= The Social Bases of Nazism, 1919–1933 =

2003 book by Detlef Mühlberger

- Author: Detlef Muehlberger
- Language: English
- Genre: Non-fiction
- Publication date: 2003

The Social Bases of Nazism, 1919–1933 is a 2003 non-fiction book written by Detlef Mühlberger. It analyses the social structure of the Nazi party and its electorate, and its historical development (its support from middle-classes and small groups, and economically).
