= Philippe DeVille =

Belgian economist

Philippe R. DeVillé
- Born: 5 August 1944 (age 81)
- Occupation: Belgian economist
- Known for: Macroeconomics, Labor Markets, Economics and Social JusticeContributions in the field of socioeconomic systems theory
- Notable work: Many research papers and articles

Philippe R. DeVillé (born 5 August 1944) is a Belgian economist, and Emeritus Professor of Economics at the University of Louvain, known for his contributions in the field of socioeconomic systems theory in collaboration with Tom R. Burns and others.

== Biography ==
DeVille received his Master of Science in economics at the Université catholique de Louvain in 1967. In 1969 he went to Stanford University on a C.R.B. Graduate Fellowship of the Belgian American Educational Foundation, where in 1973 he received his PhD in Economics with a minor in Engineering Economic Systems.

DeVille started his academic career as Assistant Professor of Economics at the University of New Hampshire in 1973. In 1976 he returned to the University of Louvain, where he was Professor of Economics from 1975 to 1984. He became full professor in economics in 1989. He has been visiting professor at the University of Quebec at Montreal in 1978/79, at the St Petersburg Technical University 1991/2000. In 1986–1987, he was a Fellow at the Swedish Collegium for Advanced Study in Uppsala, Sweden and in 1991 he was visiting professor at University of São Paulo, Brazil. In 1992 DeVille was Fulbright Fellow at the University of Massachusetts and in 1998 Honorary Fulbright Fellow, Hoover Foundation at Stanford University. At UCLouvain, DeVille chaired the department of economics from 1988 to 1991 and from 1995 to 1997. In 1991/92 and 1992 to 1994 he also directed the Institut de Recherches Economiques et Sociales of the university.

Since the 1970s DeVille collaborated with Tom R. Burns and a number of other researchers, such as Walter F. Buckley, Matthew Cooper, Thomas Baumgartner, David Meeker, Bernard Gauci developing new theories in the field of social systems theory.

== Publications ==
Books, a selection:

- 1978. Power, Conflict, and Exchange in Social Life With Thomas Martin Baumgartner and Tom R. Burns
- 1985. Man, decisions, society : the theory of actor-system dynamics for social scientists. With Thomas Baumgartner and Tom R. Burns.
- 1986. The Shaping of Socio-Economic Systems. With Thomas Baumgartner and Tom R. Burns.2nd ed. 2014

Research papers and articles, a sample:

- 1976. Institutional Responses to Crisis in Capitalist Development: A Dialectical Systems Approach to State Regulation With Tom R. Burns. Universitetet i Oslo, Instituttet for Sosiologi
- 1980. Inflation Processes and Games: The Case of Belgium. With Thomas Martin Baumgartner, Tom R. Burns. SIAR
- 1982. The Dynamics of Inflation in Belgium: Actors, Institutional Settings and Structure with Thomas Martin Baumgartner, Tom R. Burns. Uppsala universitet, Sociologiska institutionen.
- 1988. Marché et concurrence comme fondements de l’ordre social, les impasses de la théorie économique, Revue européenne des sciences sociales, XXVI, n° 82, pp. 121 129
- 1990. Equilibrium versus Reproduction, Some Queries about Dynamics in Social Systems Theory, F. Geyer and J. Van Der Zouwen (ed.) Self-referencing in Social Systems, pp. 155–174
- 1990. Comportements concurrentiels et équilibre général : de la nécessité des institutions, Economie Appliquée, 3, pp. 9–34.
- 1992. Theoretical Foundations of Asymmetries in the Wage-employment Relationship Paper Prepared for the European Economic Association Congress in Dublin, 29–31 August 1992
- 1992. Income Distribution Consensus and Macroeconomic Stability in a New Keynesian Framework. With M. Germain, IRES Working paper 9209
- 1994 Méthodologie économique et explication causale, in R. Franck (ed.), L'explication causale dans les sciences sociales, Paris, Vrin.
- 1996 Belgian Post-War Growth, in N. Crafts and G. Toniolo (ed.), Economic Growth in Europe since 1945, Cambridge, Cambridge Univ. Press, pp. 173–209, With I. Cassiers and P. Solar.
- 2004. Can Competition Ever be Fair? » Ethical Theory and Moral Practice , (with Ch. Arnsperger).
- 2008. Can homo oeconomicus be a revolutionary? , in H. Flam (ed.) Rule Systems Theory, Frankfurt, Peter Lang, (with Ch. Arnsperger), pp. 299–316
- 2013 A Socio-economic Systems Model of the Global Financial Crisis of 2007 : Power, Innovation, Ideology, and Design Failure. In: J. Pixley and G. Harcourt (eds.) Financial Crises and the Nature of Capitalist Money, London, Palgrave/Macmillan, With T. Burns and Alberto Martinelli.
