= Tony Plansky =

American football player (1900–1979)

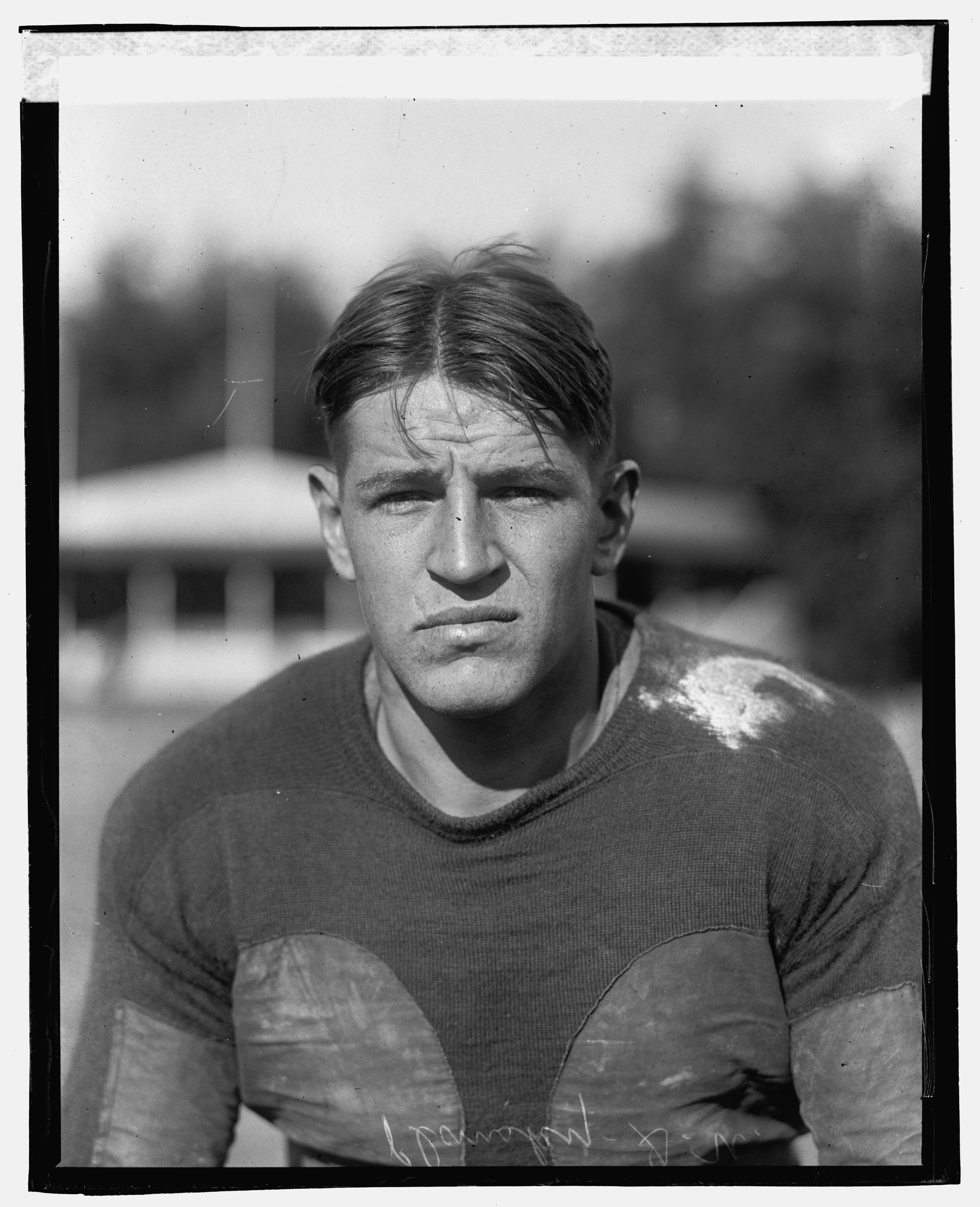

Profile
- Position: Running back

Personal information
- Born: June 20, 1900; South Boston, Massachusetts, U.S.
- Died: February 10, 1979 (aged 78); North Adams, Massachusetts, U.S.

Career information
- College: Georgetown

Career history
- 1928–1929: New York Giants
- 1932: Boston Braves

Awards and highlights
- First-team All-Pro (1929); Third-team All-American (1925)

Anthony Joseph Plansky (June 20, 1900 – February 10, 1979) was an American football running back who played professionally in the National Football League (NFL) for the New York Giants and Boston Braves.

== Biography ==
A native of South Boston, Massachusetts, Plansky attended Georgetown University, where he was a star fullback and decathlete. He was the AAU national decathlon champion in 1924, and won the decathlon event at the prestigious Penn Relays in 1925 and 1926. Planksy was also an accomplished triple jumper, placing 3rd at the 1922 and 1923 USA Outdoor Track and Field Championships. On the gridiron, he was a member of the 1925 College Football All-America Team and the 1925 All-Eastern football team.

Plansky narrowly missed competing in the decathlon at the 1928 Summer Olympics in Amsterdam. In April 1928, he again won the decathlon event at the Penn Relays, which was widely thought to be the Olympic qualifying event, but was later determined not to be.

Plansky played professional football for the NFL's Giants in 1928 and 1929. In his second season, he scored nine touchdowns, two field goals, and two extra points, and was named to the 1929 All-Pro Team. He also played in one game for the 1932 Boston Braves, his final NFL appearance.

In 1928 and 1929, he played summer baseball for the Hyannis town team in the Cape Cod Baseball League (CCBL), and was part of a "parade of sluggers" that powered the Hyannis lineup. He went on to play professional baseball with the Erie Sailors of the Central League, batting .337 in 126 games in 1930. In 1931 and 1932, he played for the Scranton Miners of the New York–Penn League. He returned to the CCBL and was a league all-star for Bourne from 1933 to 1939, serving as player-manager in 1935, and leading Bourne to its first league championship in 1936.

Plansky became an assistant coach at Williams College in 1931, and in 1936 became head track and cross country coach, a position he held until 1978. One of Plansky's athletes at Williams was future New York Yankees owner George Steinbrenner, a hurdler who graduated in 1952.

Plansky died in 1979 in North Adams, Massachusetts at the age of 78. In 1987, thanks in large part to the efforts of Steinbrenner, a new track was installed at Williams, and named in memory of Plansky. In 1999, Plansky was ranked by Sports Illustrated as the #25 all-time greatest sports figure from Massachusetts, and in 2001 he was inducted into the CCBL Hall of Fame.

== Gallery ==
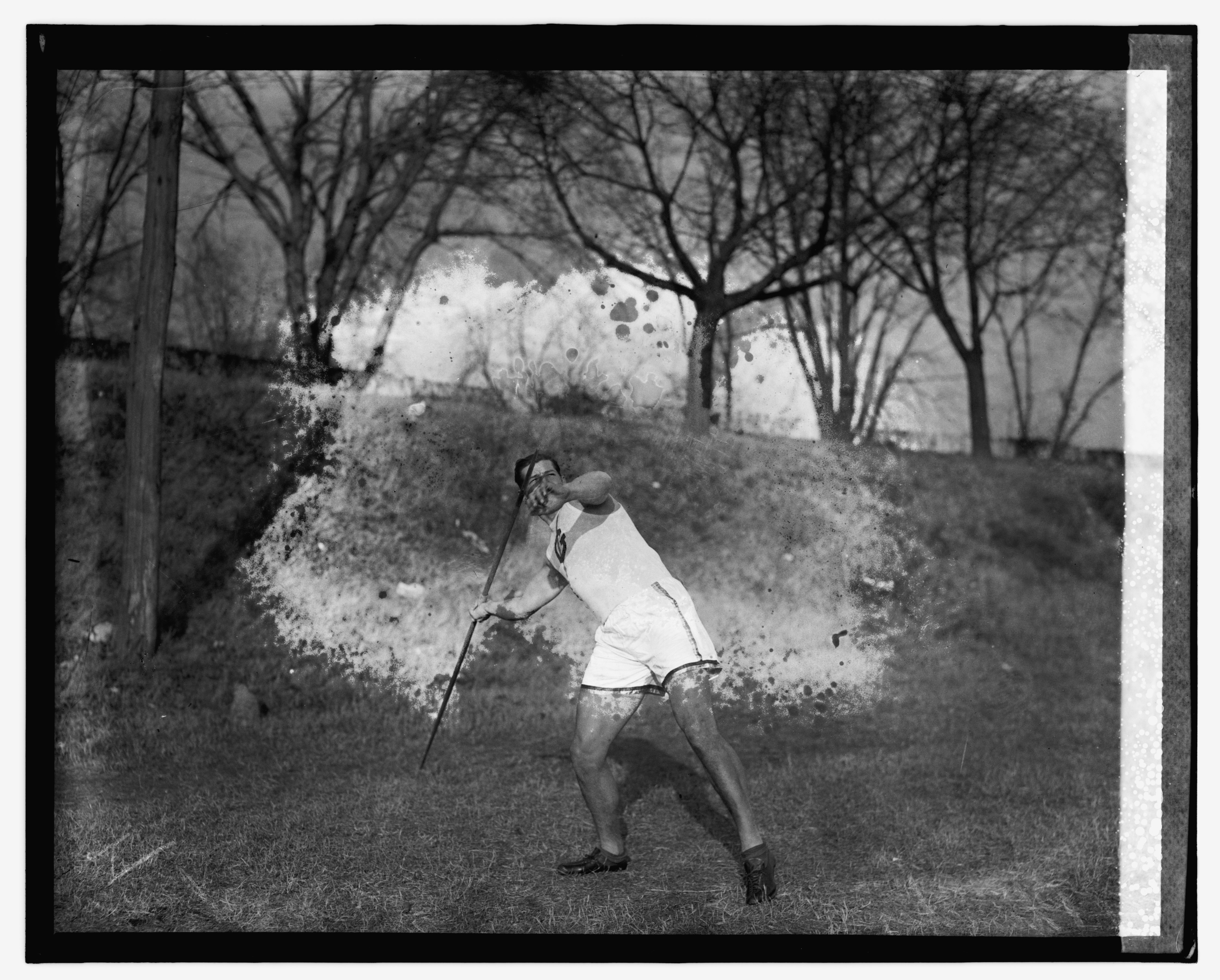
Plansky throwing javelin for Georgetown University

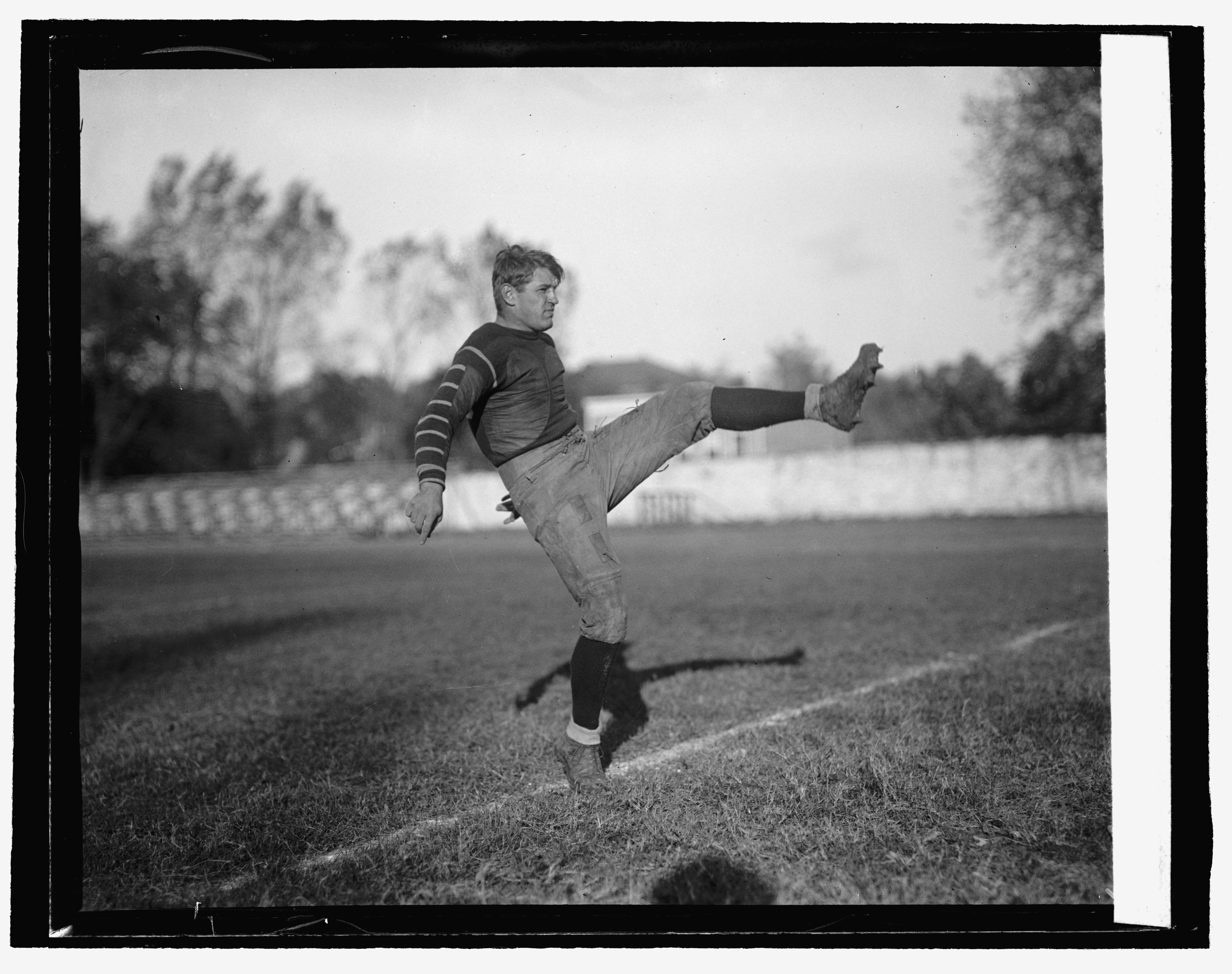
Plansky playing football for Georgetown University

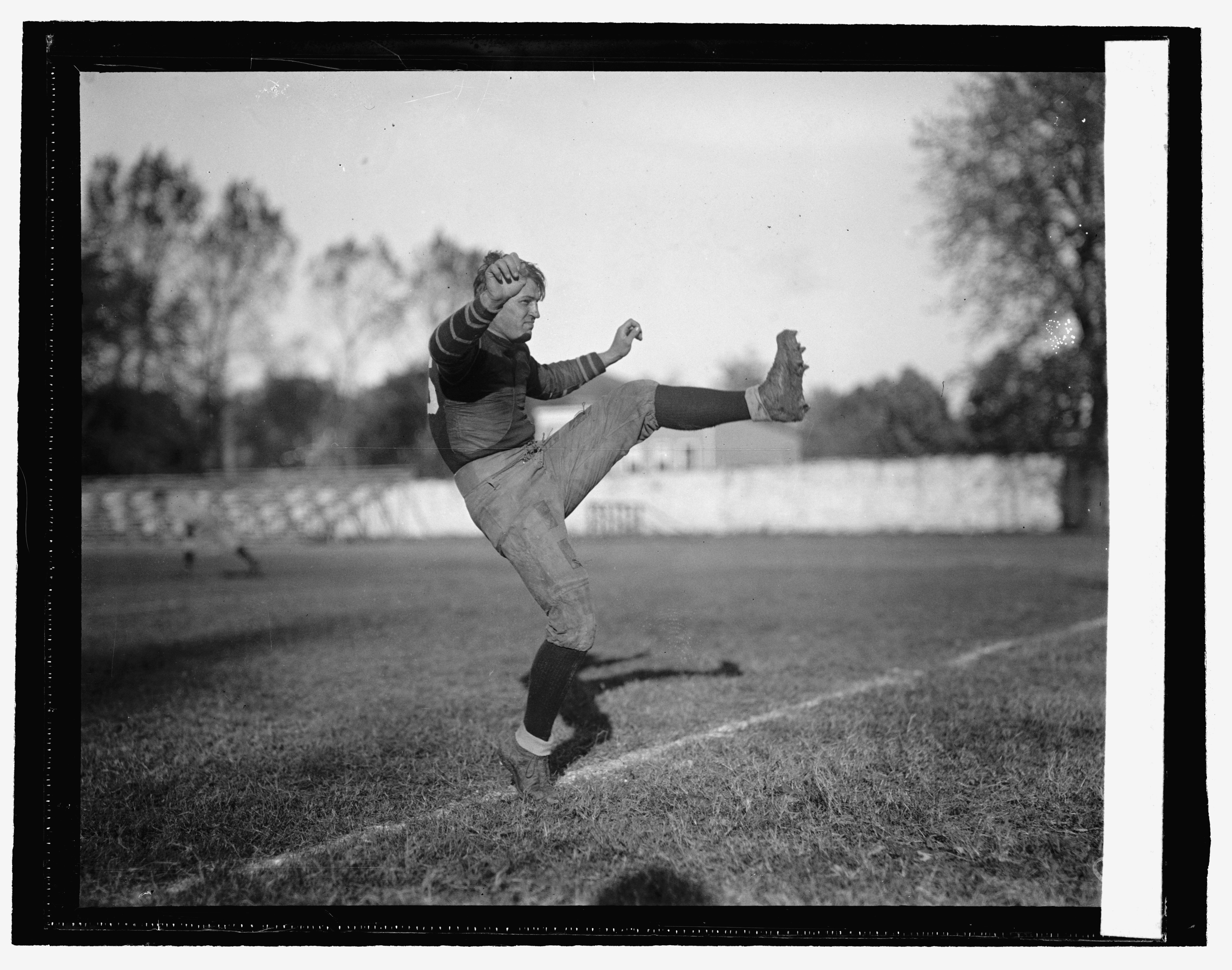
Plansky playing football for Georgetown University
