= 1929 All-Pro Team =

Official list of the best NFL players in 1929

The 1929 All-Pro Team consisted of American football players chosen by various selectors for the All-Pro team of the National Football League (NFL) for the 1929 NFL season. Teams were selected by, among others, the Green Bay Press-Gazette (GB), based on the return of 16 ballots sent to the team owners, managers, and sports writers of clubs in the NFL, Collyer's Eye magazine (CE), and the Chicago Tribune (CT).

== Team ==
Position	Player	Team	Selector(s)
Quarterback	Benny Friedman	New York Giants	GB-1, CE-1, CT-1
Halfback	Verne Lewellen	Green Bay Packers	GB-1, CE-1, CT-1
Halfback	Tony Plansky	New York Giants	GB-1, CE-1, CT-1
Fullback	Ernie Nevers	Chicago Cardinals	GB-1, CE-1, CT-1
End	LaVern Dilweg	Green Bay Packers	GB-1, CE-1, CT-1
End	Ray Flaherty	New York Giants	GB-1, CE-1, CT-1
Tackle	Bull Behman	Frankford Yellow Jackets	GB-1, CE-1, CT-1
Tackle	Bob Beattie	Orange Tornadoes	GB-1
Tackle	Steve Owen	New York Giants	CE-1
Tackle	Duke Slater	Chicago Cardinals	CT-1
Guard	Mike Michalske	Green Bay Packers	GB-1, CE-1, CT-1
Guard	Milt Rehnquist	Providence Steam Roller	GB-1
Guard	Walt Kiesling	Chicago Cardinals	CE-1
Guard	Cal Hubbard	Green Bay Packers	CT-1
Center	Joe Wostoupal	New York Giants	GB-1, CE-1, CT-1
