= Tom R. Burns =

Swedish-American sociologist (1937–2025)

Thomas Rearden Burns (27 February 1937 – 25 April 2025) was a Swedish-American sociologist and academic, who was professor emeritus of sociology at the University of Uppsala in Sweden and founder of the Uppsala Theory Circle.

== Biography ==
Burns grew up in Arkansas, United States, and was in a Franciscan Monastery for a number of years. As a teenager, he attended Phillips Academy Andover in Massachusetts, before going to Stanford University to study physics and mathematics, where he obtained his BS in physics in 1959. In the years 1959–60 he studied physics and sociology for almost two years at the University of Warsaw, Poland, as an exchange student from Stanford. He returned to Stanford, where he obtained his MA in sociology in 1962 and his PhD in sociology in 1969.

He started his academic career as assistant professor at the George Washington University, and moved to the University of New Hampshire in 1968, where he became associate professor in 1973. From 1976 to 1983 he was senior researcher at the Scandinavian Institutes for Administrative Research. In this period he also was Professor at the Stockholm University in Sweden from 1978 to 1980, Professor at the University of Oslo in Norway from 1979 to 1982.

In 1982 he was appointed to the position of Professor of Sociology at the University of Uppsala, which he held until 2002 after which he became emeritus Professor. Back in the United States he was also Clarence J. Robinson University Professor at the George Mason University from 1987 to 1990. From 2003 to 2006 he was NORFA Professor at the Centre for International Environment and Development Studies at the Norwegian University of Life Sciences. He was visiting professor at the Lisbon University Institute (ISCTE), in Portugal from 2007 to 2013.

Among his other professional engagements, he has been Jean Monnet Visiting professor at the European University Institute, Florence, Italy, 2002; Visiting Scholar, Stanford University, Spring, 2002, Spring, 2004–2008; Fellow at Swedish Collegium for Advanced Study (Spring, 1992; Autumn, 1998), and Fellow at the European University Institute (Spring, 1998).

Burns died in Uppsala, Sweden on 25 April 2025, at the age of 88.

== Uppsala Theory Circle ==
Burns was the founder of the Uppsala Theory Circle (UTC) at Uppsala University, devoted to the development of sociological and social science theory and its applications in empirical and policy research. UTC functioned as an international, interdisciplinary collegium of scholars. A major pole of UTC was located in Uppsala, Sweden, but with contributors and participants found in other parts of Europe as well as in China, Africa, and the Americas.

The group conducted regular seminars, workshops, etc. often engaging leading Swedish and international scholars who were fellows at The Swedish Collegium for Advanced Study. Beginning in the mid-1980s, this institution brought many distinguished scholars to Uppsala, in particular. The UTC was particularly active in the 1980s and 1990s. Since 2000, much of the core, which was engaged initially in Uppsala, has dispersed within and outside of Sweden.

== Work ==
=== Actor-system dynamics (ASD) ===
Beginning in the early 1970s, Burns collaborated with a number of researchers, such as Thomas Baumgartner, Walter F. Buckley, Matthew Cooper, Philippe DeVille, David Meeker, Bernard Gauci, among others. They have been developing a new theory complex, which came to be referred to as actor-system dynamics (ASD), a new social systems theory, substantially different from Parson's systems theory and the systems theory later developed by Niklas Luhmann.

This approach brought human agents in a natural and coherent way into system modelling. It saw agents (individuals and collectives) in their strategems and ploys as constrained as well as enabled by system structures, but also as forces structuring and restructuring systems and, in some instances, creating entirely new ones.

This theoretical work went hand in hand with a wide range of empirical investigations. It built bridges not only within the social sciences and humanities but also between the social sciences and humanities, on the one hand, and the natural, technical, and medical sciences, on the other hand. Research projects on the environment, technology, engineering, and medicine were an expression of this interdisciplinarity.

=== Social rule system theory ===
On the basis of ASD theory Burns and Dietz developed a non-biological theory of sociocultural evolution, which they called Social rule system theory.

Social rule system theory was formulated in the 1980s by Burns and Helena Flam together with others was a contribution to the New Institutionalism.

=== Sociology of human consciousness ===
In the 1990s a sociology of human consciousness was developed by Burns, Erik Engdahl, Nora Machado, and Sviatoslav Korepov based on sociology and social psychology traditions, in particular inspired by George Herbert Mead. In addition, a number of new theoretical concepts such as social structuring, meta-power and relational control, organizational dissonance and contradiction, and public policy paradigm theory were formulated and applied in empirical investigations.

On a policy oriented level, the risks of complex socio-technical systems, the emergence of post-parliamentary democracy and new forms of governance, and the instabilities and ecological and social destructiveness of capitalism have been particular foci of attention since the early 1990s.

=== Rule complex ===
A rule complex is a set consisting of rules and/or other rule complexes. This is a generalization of a set of rules, and provides a tool to investigate and describe how rules can function as values, norms, judgmental or prescriptive rules, and meta-rules. Also possible is to examine objects consisting of rules such as roles, routines, algorithms, models of reality, social relationships, and institutions. In game theory, rules and rule complexes can be used to define the behavior and interactions of the players (although the rules are not necessarily static). Rule complexes are especially associated with Tom R. Burns, Anna Gomolinska and the Uppsala Theory Circle.

==== Formalization ====
In this setting, a rule is type of knowledge (in the sense of epistemic logic (see Fagin, 2003)) formalized as a set of premises or conditions, a set of justifications, and a set of conclusions (this may be written as a triple, a rule $r:=(X,Y,\alpha)$). Elements of X should hold, and of Y may hold. If Y, the justifications, do not hold, then the rule cannot be applied. If X, the premises, obtain and the justifications are not known to not apply, then the rule is applied, and $\alpha$ is concluded. If X and Y are empty, then the rule is axiomatic (a "fact" or unconditional directive). Thus, rules can be seen as the basic objects of knowledge.

Formally, a rule complex is the class which contains all finite sets of rules, is closed under set-theoretical union and power set, and preserves inclusion:

1. Any finite set of rules is a rule complex;
2. If $C_1, C_2$ are rule complexes, then $C_1 \cup C_2$ and $P(C_1)$ are rule complexes;
3. If $C_1 \subseteq C_2$ and $C_2$ is a rule complex, then $C_1$ is a rule complex.

This means that for rule complexes $C_1$ and $C_2$, $C_1 \cap C_2, C_1 - C_2$ are also rule complexes. A complex $B$ is a subcomplex of the complex $A$ if $B=A$ or $B$ may be obtained from $A$ by deleting some rules from $A$ and/or redundant parentheses (Burns, 2005).

=== Generalized game theory ===
Generalized game theory is an extension of game theory incorporating social theory concepts such as norm, value, belief, role, social relationship, and institution. The theory was developed by Tom R. Burns, Anna Gomolinska, and Ewa Roszkowska but has not had great influence beyond these immediate associates. The theory seeks to address certain perceived limitations of game theory by formulating a theory of rules and rule complexes and to develop a more robust approach to socio-psychological and sociological phenomena.

==== Overview ====
In generalized game theory, games are conceptualized as rule complexes, which is a set containing rules and/or other rule complexes. However, the rules may be imprecise, inconsistent, and even dynamic. Distinctions in the properties and functions of different types of rules allows the rules themselves to be analyzed in complex ways, and thus the models of the theory more closely represent relationships and institutions investigated in the social sciences.

The ways in which the rules may be changed is developed within the context of generalized game theory based on the principle of rule revision and game restructuring. These types of games are referred to as open games, that is, games which are open to transformation. Games which have specified, fixed players, fixed preference structures, fixed optimization procedures, and fixed action alternatives and outcomes are called closed games (characteristic of most classical game theory models).

Because its premises derive from social theory generalized game theory emphasizes and provides cultural and institutional tools for game conceptualization and analysis, what Granovetter (1985) refers to as the social embeddedness of interaction and social and economic processes. This is in contrast to conceptualization of games consisting of actors which are autonomous utility maximizers. Further, the modeling of the actors themselves in generalized game theory is especially open to the use of concepts such as incomplete information and bounded rationality.

Proponents of generalized game theory have advocated the application of the theory to reconceptualizing individual and collective decision-making, resolutions of the prisoners' dilemma game, agent-based modeling, fuzzy games, conflict resolution procedures, challenging and providing robust and normatively grounded alternatives to Nash equilibrium and Pareto optimality, among others.

==== Principles ====
===== Judgment in generalized game theory =====
A key aspect of actors decision making in generalized game theory is based on the concept of judgment. Several types of judgment could be relevant, for instance value judgment, factual judgment, and action judgment. In the case of action judgment, the actor seeks to take the course of action offered by the rules of the game which most closely fit the values held by the actor (where the values are a sub-rule complex of the game).

Predicting how actors will react under these sub-rules is hypothesised to be more accurate than forming traditional game theory complexes. Armstrong (2002) found that when actors hold differing beliefs and roles within a sub-game formal game theory Nash equilibriums became less reliable (generalised game theory has received less scrutiny due to lack of notoriety).

Even the method by which the actor calculates closeness of fit can be controlled by the actors values (such as an actor might use a more speedy algorithm, or a more far-sighted one). Each actor has a judgment operator by which the actor can create a preference order of the perceived qualities of possible outcomes based on satisfying the condition that the qualities of the outcomes can be roughly said to be sufficiently similar to the qualities of the actors primary values or norms. Thus, in generalized game theory, each actor's judgment calculus includes the institutional context of the game.

===== General game solutions =====
A general or common game solution is a strategy or interaction order for the agents which satisfies or realizes the relevant norms and values of the players. This should lead to a state that is acceptable by the game players, and is not necessarily a normative equilibrium, but represents the "best result attainable under the circumstances".

Solutions may be reached through a sequence of proposed alternatives, and when the actors find the ultimate solution acceptable, the proposed solutions may be said to be convergent. Roszkowska and Burns (2005) showed that not every game has a common solution, and that divergent proposals may arise. This may result in a no equilibrium being found, and stems from dropping the assumption for the existence of a Nash equilibrium that the game be finite or that the game have complete information. Another possibility is the existence of a rule which allows a dictator to force an equilibrium. The rules which make up the norms of the game are one way of resolving the problem of choosing between multiple equilibria, such as those arising in the so-called folk theorem.

===== Generalization =====
Generalization in psychological terms is the measure of how a theory holds up when applied in a non-experimental environment. Hence, generalised game theory takes elements from this quality and applies them to game theories. Many traditional Nash equilibriums can be applied to social and psychological interactions through generalization.

When Roszkowska and Burns first discussed the notion of generalised game theory, it stemmed from a need to make game theory more applicable to the real world. Game theory being more useful in describing mathematics and economics than describing psychological phenomena. Traditional notions of best choice and optimal strategy are replaced by consequentialism and instrumental rationality when applied in less abstract contexts, such as the prisoner's dilemma, dictator game and public goods game.

In open environments actors can transform game rules to create “open games”. For example, if the actors concur that the consequences of their actions aren't ideal they may introduce cooperation sub-rules when there is no one adjudicating the scenario. Depending on the differing status and dispositions of the actors, game transformation can occur to form an asymmetric set of rules resulting in a non-optimal outcome. When game theories are generalized, these uncertainty factors are accounted for in the formation of interaction patterns, but role-playing is often required to understand what optimal solutions will result.

===== Interaction Patterns =====
Different observable interaction patterns will create different normative equilibriums.

- In consequentialist-orientated interactions actors will determine their choices based on the expected outcomes, acting in their best interest regardless of the external consequences.
- In normative-orientated interactions actors will have their choices influenced by their values and roles under the context of any sub-rules or societal circumstances.
- Emotional interactions are viewed as irrational under traditional game theory wherein the actors make decisions based on altruism or spite.
- In routine interactions actors resort to habitual modalities and standard learned procedures to make decisions.

Interaction patterns can involve a combination of these to form resulting value judgements for divergent or contradictory outcomes.

==== Example: prisoner's dilemma ====
In the example of the two-player prisoner's dilemma, for instance, proponents of generalized game theory are critical of the rational Nash equilibrium wherein both actors defect because rational actors, it is argued, would actually be predisposed to work out coordinating mechanisms in order to achieve optimum outcomes. Although these mechanisms are not usually included in the rules of the game, generalized game theorists argue that they do exist in real life situations.

This is because there exists in most interaction situations a social relationship between the players characterized by rules and rule complexes. This relationship may be one of, for instance, solidarity (which results in the Pareto optimal outcome), adversary (which results in the Nash equilibrium), or even hierarchy (by which one actor sacrifices their own benefits for the other's good). Some values, such as pure rivalry, are seen as nonstable because both actors would seek asymmetric gain, and thus would need to either transform the game or seek another value to attempt to satisfy.

If no communication mechanism is given (as is usual in the prisoner's dilemma), the operative social relationship between the actors is based on the actors own beliefs about the other (perhaps as another member of the human race, solidarity will be felt, or perhaps as an adversary). This illustrates the principle of game transformation, which is a key element of the theory.

== Publications ==
Burns and his collaborators have published more than 10 books and numerous articles on theory and methodology as well as more empirically and policy-oriented in the areas of socio-economics, markets and market regulation, the sociology of technology, environment, and natural resources, administration and management, governance and politics.

- Transitions to Alternative Energy Systems: Entrepreneurs, New Technologies, and Social Change (1984).
- Man, Decisions, Society (1985),
- The Shaping of Socio-economic Systems (1986),
- The Shaping of Social Organization: Social Rule System Theory and Its Applications (1987),
- Creative Democracy (1988),
- Societal Decision-making: Democratic Challenges to State Technocracy (1992),
- Municipal Entrepreneurship and Energy Policy: A Five Nation Study of Politics, Innovation, and Social Change (1994),
