= Helena Flam =

Polish-born sociologist

Helena Flam (born 2 May 1951) is a Polish-born sociologist and Professor of Sociology at the University of Leipzig, Germany, known for her work on social organization, emotions and social movements.

== Life and work ==
After leaving Poland for Sweden in 1969, Flam studied sociology at Lund University, where she obtained a Filosofie kandidat (B.A.) degree in 1977. She then obtained an M.A., M.Phil. and Ph.D. from Columbia University's Department of Sociology in 1977, 1978 and 1982, respectively. Returning to Sweden, she did research at the Scandinavian Institutes of Administrative Research (SIAR) and SIFO as well as Uppsala University (1984–85). She then worked for the Swedish Collegium for Advanced Study in the Social Sciences (1985–87).

In 1987, inadvertently, her academic career in Germany began: she was first a Research Fellow at the Max Planck Institute for the Study of Societies, Cologne, then assistant professor at the University of Konstanz (1990–1993), and eventually full professor of sociology at the University of Leipzig.

Flam's focus is on political sociology, in particular social movement research, and the political dimension of migration, including institutional discrimination. She also contributed to the sociology of emotions and rule systems theory.

== Books ==
- The Shaping of Social Organization: Social Rule System Theory with Applications. London: Sage, 1987. ISBN 9780803980273 (edited with Tom R. Burns)
- States and Anti-Nuclear Movements. Edinburgh: Edinburgh University Press, 1994. ISBN 0748603964 (edited & contributed four chapters)
- Mosaic of Fear: Poland and East Germany before 1989. Boulder, Colorado: European Monographs, 1995. ISBN 9780880334068
- The Emotional 'Man' and the Problem of Collective Action. Berlin/New York: Peter Lang, 2000. ISBN 0820447013
- Pink, Purple, Green - Women’s, Religious, Environmental, and Gay/Lesbian Movements in Central Europe Today. Boulder, Colorado: East European Monographs, 2001 ISBN 0880334754 (edited)
- Emotions and Social Movements. London: Routledge, 2005. ISBN 9780203013526 (edited with Debra King & contributed two chapters)
- Rule Systems Theory: Explorations and Applications. Frankfurt: Peter Lang, 2008. ISBN 9783631575963 (edited with Marcus Carson & contributed one chapter)
- Theorizing Emotions: Sociological Explorations and Applications. Frankfurt a.M./New York: Campus, 2009. ISBN 9783593389721 (edited with Debra Hopkins, Jochen Kleres, and Helmut Kuzmics & contributed one chapter)
- Methods for Exploring Emotions. London. Routledge, 2015. (edited with Jochen Kleres, also contributed three chapters)
