= Thomas Baumgartner =

Swiss economist

Thomas Martin Baumgartner
- Citizenship: Switzerland
- Education: University of New Hampshire
- Occupation: economist

Thomas Martin Baumgartner (born 1943) is a Swiss economist, known for his pioneering work in social systems theory with Walter F. Buckley, Tom R. Burns and others.

== Life and work ==
Baumgartner started his academic career at the University of New Hampshire, where he received his PhD in economics 1976 with the dissertation The political economy of international economic exchange and development : a systems approach to the structuring of the international economic system.

After his promotion Baumgartner was affiliated with the University of Quebec at Montreal as visiting professor, with the University of Louvain in Belgium, and with the Institute of Sociology of the University of Oslo, ending up as research consultant in Zurich, Switzerland, in the late 1980s, where in the 1990s he worked the IUSA, the Creato-network for environmental planning in Zurich, the Öko-Institut in Freiburg (Germany), and the Institut für ökologische Wirtschaftsforschung (Heidelberg, Germany).

In the early 1970s Baumgartner collaborated with Tom R. Burns and a number of other researchers, such as Walter F. Buckley, Matthew Cooper, Philippe DeVille, David Meeker, and Bernard Gauci, among others. They have been developing a new theory complex, which came to be referred to as actor-system dynamics (ASD), a new social systems theory, substantially different from Parson's systems theory and the systems theory later developed by Niklas Luhmann.

== Publications ==
Books, a selection

- 1975. Multi-level, dialectical social action : an open systems theory perspective. With Walter F. Buckley and Tom R. Burns
- 1976. The Political Economy of International Economic Exchange and Development: A Systems Approach to the Structuring of the International Economic System. University of New Hampshire.
- 1982. Power, Conflict, and Exchange in Social Life: An Actor-oriented Systems Theory of the Structuring and Dialectics of Social Systems. With Walter F. Buckley and P. DeVille. Institute of Sociology, Uppsala.
- 1984. Transitions to alternative energy systems : entrepreneurs, new technologies, and social change. Edited with Tom R. Burns.
- 1985. Man, decisions, society : the theory of actor-system dynamics for social scientists. With Tom R. Burns and Philippe DeVille.
- 1986. Shaping of socio-economic systems : the application of the theory of actor-system dynamics to conflict, social power, and institutional innovation in economic life. With Tom R. Burns and Philippe DeVille; Preface by Amitai Etzioni.
- 1987. Politics of energy forecasting : a comparative study of energy forecasting in Western Europe and North America. Edited with Atle Midttun.
- 1997. Partizipation als Entscheidungshilfe : Pardizipp, ein Verfahren der (Langfrist-)Planung und Zukunftsforschung. With Peter H. Mettler
