= Walter F. Buckley =

American sociologist

- Born: April 17, 1921; Lynn, Massachusetts
- Died: 27 January 2006 (aged 84)
- Known for: Introducing cybernetic principles to sociology
- Scientific career
- Fields: Sociology, Systems theory

Walter Frederick Buckley (April 17, 1921 – January 27, 2006) was an American sociologist, and professor of sociology at the University of New Hampshire. Buckley was among the first to apply concepts from general systems theory based on the work of Bertalanffy to sociology. In 1968 he coined the term complex adaptive system.

== Biography ==
Born and raised in Lynn, Massachusetts, Buckley studied sociology at the University of Wisconsin–Madison. In 1958 he received his Ph.D. with the doctoral dissertation Sociological theory and social stratification, in which he outlined a non-functionalist theory of social stratification.

Buckley started his academic career early 1960s as assistant professor of sociology at the University of California, Santa Barbara in the department of sociology, which was chaired by David Gold PhD. From 1971 to 1985 he was professor of sociology at the University of New Hampshire. In the 1970s he participated in the Uppsala Theory Circle at the Uppsala University in Sweden founded by Tom R. Burns. In 1998 he was awarded the honorary chair of the Socio-Cybernetics Research Committee of the International Sociological Association.

Buckley has been described as a pioneer in social systems theory that challenged conventional views. In his personal life he appreciated jazz music and played tenor saxophone. He died in 2006 in Durham, New Hampshire.

== Publications ==
Books, a selection:

- 1959. Sociological theory and social stratification. Dissertation University of Wisconsin–Madison.
- 1967, Sociology and Modern Systems Theory. Prentice Hall
- 1968, Modern Systems Research for the Behavioral Scientist. Foreword from Anatol Rapoport,
- 1969. Class and society with Kurt Bernd Mayer. New York
- 1971. A systems study in regional inequality: Norrbotten, a fourth of Sweden. With Bengt Sandkull. Stockholm,
- 1975. Multi-level, dialectical social action : an open systems theory perspective. With Thomas Baumgartner and Tom R. Burns
- 1976. Power and control : social structures and their transformation Edited by Tom R. Burns and Walter Buckley. London : SAGE.
- 1982. Power, Conflict, and Exchange in Social Life: An Actor-oriented Systems Theory of the Structuring and Dialectics of Social Systems. With Thomas Baumgartner and P. DeVille. Institute of Sociology, Uppsala.
- 1998, Society—A Complex Adaptive System : Essays in Social Theory, Routledge.
