= Tamotsu Shibutani =

Japanese-American sociologist (1920–2004)

- Born: October 15, 1920; Stockton, California, US
- Died: August 9, 2004 (aged 83); Santa Barbara, California, US

Academic background
- Education: University of California, Berkeley; University of Chicago

Academic work
- Institutions: University of California, Berkeley; University of California, Santa Barbara
- Notable works: Society and Personality (1961)

Tamotsu Shibutani (15 October 1920 – 8 August 2004) was a Japanese American sociologist working on the tradition of symbolic interactionism.

== Biography ==
Shibutani was born in Stockton, California and majored in sociology and philosophy at the University of California at Berkeley. He was sent with his family to the Tule Lake internment camp in 1942 during World War II, following the signing of Executive Order 9066.

After the war, Shibutani obtained his doctorate at University of Chicago, completing his degree in 1948. He taught there for a few years and then moved to the University of California at Berkeley. While at Chicago and Berkeley, he published two influential books: Improvised News: A Sociological Study of Rumor (1966) and The Derelicts of Company K: A Sociological Study of Demoralization (1978). He later became a professor in the Department of Sociology at the University of California, Santa Barbara.

In 2004, Shibutani died at the age of 83 in Santa Barbara, California.

== Publications ==
- Society and Personality: an interactionist approach to social psychology (1961)
- Ethnic Stratification: a comparative approach (1965)
- Improvised News: a sociological study of rumor (1966)
- Human Nature and Collective Behavior; papers in honor of Herbert Blumer (1970)
- The Derelicts of Company K: a sociological study of demoralization (1978)
- Social Processes: An Introduction to Sociology (1986)
