= Amazing Detective Di Renjie =

- DVD cover art
- Also known as: Shen Tan Di Renjie; Wu Chao Mi An

Chinese name
- Traditional Chinese: 神探狄仁傑 / 武朝迷案
- Simplified Chinese: 神探狄仁杰 / 武朝迷案
Transcriptions
Standard Mandarin
- Hanyu Pinyin: Shén Tàn Dí Rénjié / Wǔ Cháo Mí Àn
- Genre: detective fiction, historical drama, gong'an fiction, crime fiction
- Written by: Qian Yanqiu
- Directed by: Qian Yanqiu
- Presented by: Zhu Tong; Pang Jian
- Starring: Liang Guanhua; Zhang Zijian; Lü Zhong
- Opening theme: Chang Ge Yi Qu (长歌一曲) performed by Tengger
- Country of origin: China
- Original language: Mandarin
- No. of episodes: 30 (original version); 27 (simplified version)

Production
- Executive producer: Wang Guohui
- Production location: China
- Running time: 45 minutes per episode

Original release
- Network: CCTV-8
- Release: 6 August 2004

Amazing Detective Di Renjie, also known as Shen Tan Di Renjie and Wu Chao Mi An, is a Chinese television series based on gong'an detective stories related to Di Renjie, a Tang dynasty magistrate and statesman. Written and directed by Qian Yanqiu, the series starred Liang Guanhua as the titular protagonist, and was first broadcast on CCTV-8 on 6 August 2004. The series was followed by three sequels: Amazing Detective Di Renjie 2 (2006), Amazing Detective Di Renjie 3 (2008), and Mad Detective Di Renjie (2010).

== Plot ==
The plot is divided into three parts as follows:

1. Shi Tuan Jing Hun (使团惊魂), covering episodes 1 to 13.
2. Lan Shan Ji (蓝杉记), covering episodes 14 to 23.
3. Di Xue Xiong Ying (滴血雄鹰), covering episodes 24 to 30.

== Cast ==
- Liang Guanhua as Di Renjie
- Zhang Zijian as Li Yuanfang
- Lü Zhong as Wu Zetian
- Zhu Yanping as Hu Jinghui
- Xu Qian as Zeng Tai
- Diana Pang as Li Qingxia (Jin Mulan)
- Yan Yansheng as Liu Jin
- Jiang Xin as Fang Yingyu (Xiaohong)
- Xu Xiaobei as Ilterish Qaghan
- Li Shilong as Liu Chali
- Xu Feilian as Liu Chuanlin
- Liu Shuang as Princess Taiping

== Characters in the series ==
Character	2004	2006	2008	2010	Description
Character	Amazing Detective Di Renjie	Amazing Detective Di Renjie 2	Amazing Detective Di Renjie 3	Mad Detective Di Renjie	Description
Di Renjie	Liang Guanhua	Liang Guanhua	Liang Guanhua	Liang Guanhua	The Chancellor in the central court
Li Yuanfang	Zhang Zijian	Zhang Zijian	Zhang Zijian	Zhang Zijian	Di Renjie's bodyguard
Wu Zetian	Lü Zhong	Lü Zhong	Lü Zhong	Lü Zhong	The Empress of China
Zeng Tai	Xu Qian	Xu Qian	Xu Qian	Xu Qian	Di Renjie's student
Di Ruyan (Su Xian'er)		Jiang Xinyan		Qu Shanshan	Di Renjie's niece, originally an assassin
Wang Xiaojie	only mentioned	Yan Yansheng		Yan Yansheng	Senior General of Right Mighty Guard Army
Ilterish Qaghan (Jili Kehan)	Xu Xiaobei	Xu Xiaobei		Li Junqi	Founding Khan of the Tujue
Di Chun	Zhao Zhigang	Zhao Zhigang	Zhao Zhigang		Di Renjie's leading butler
Zhang Huan		Liang Kai	Liang Kai	Liang Kai	Di Renjie's assistant
Li Lang		Jia Yanfeng	Liu Niqiu	Li Zhuolin	Di Renjie's assistant
Wu Sansi	Fu Hongjun	Fu Hongjun			Prince of Liang
Li Xian	Wang Xinsheng	Wang Xinsheng		only mentioned	Crowned Prince, historically Emperor Zhongzong of Tang
Zhang Jianzhi	Ren Xuehai	Shao Yongcheng	Ren Xuehai	Wang Pu	Chancellor in the central court
Princess Taiping	Liu Shuang				Wu Zetian's daughter
Fang Qian (Liu Jin)	Yan Yansheng	only mentioned			Mayor of Youzhou
Wu Yizhi	Kong Qingzi				Deputy mayor of Youzhou
Li Qingxia (Jin Mulan)	Peng Dan				Emperor Taizong's great-granddaughter
Hu Jinghui	Zhu Yanping	Zhu Yanping (flashback)	only mentioned		A general in the imperial guard
Yu Feng	Mei Zhigang				General in the rebel army
Old Zhang (Mr. Four)	Pan Yaochu				Resident of Big Willow Village
Lu Dayou	Li Haifeng	Li Haifeng (flashback)			Resident of Youzhou
Liu Chali	Li Shilong				A retired official living in Huzhou
Liu Chuanlin	Xu Feilian				Liu Chali's son
Yingyu	Jiang Xin				The Crown Prince's Maid of Honor
Li Gui	Lu Ming				Son of Prince of Yue
Liu Da	Zhao Junkai				Liu Chali's servant, a secret police
Xu Shide	Qian Yanqiu				A secret police
He Yun	Xia Zhiping				An official who bred horses for Wu Zetian
Gao Rujin (Jiang Xiaolang)	Guo Xiao'an				A retired county governor, formerly a general under Yuwen Huaji during the Sui dynasty
Yang Fang		Meng Lingfei			Di Renjie's assistant
Ren Kuo		Liu Jihe			Di Renjie's assistant
Qi Hu		Gong Haibin	Gong Haibin		Di Renjie's assistant
Pan Yue		Wang Lei	Wang Lei		Di Renjie's assistant
Shen Tao		He Zhengheng	He Zhengheng		Di Renjie's assistant
Xiao Bao		Li Zhuolin	Li Zhuolin		Di Renjie's assistant
Xiao Qingfang		Qiao Hong		only mentioned	Leader of a rebellion group while being the commander of Wu Zetian's secret police agency
Hui Wenzhong		Chunyu Shanshan			A highly skilled assassin
Li Kaigu		Jiang Changyi			A Khitan general serving in Wu Zetian's army
Quan Shancai		Huo Ercha			Senior General of the Left Guard Army
Zhao Wenhui		Song Chuyan			Commander of the Yingzhou Circuit
Huang Zhen		Cong Shan			Vice Commander of the Yingzhou Circuit
Wang Tiehan		Chen Lei			A lower-ranked general under Wang Xiaojie's command
Su Honghui		Zhou Ying		only mentioned	A lower-ranked general under Wang Xiaojie's command
Qiu Jing		Zhang Chengxiang			Mayor of Chongzhou
Bug-Chor (Mo Chuo)		Deng Wei		only mentioned	Son of Jili Kehan
Yuan Tiangang		Shao Wanlin			A legendary astrologer and engineer
Xiaomei and Xiaofeng		Shu Yan			Twin sisters and assassins
Lu Cheng		Li Shilong			Yuan Tiangang's student
Wu Xiang		Ji Jun			Owner of the Qingyang Hotel in Liuzhou
Huan Bin		Su Gang			A leader in the rebel group while being a general in the imperial guard
The Fake Xue Qingling		Zhao Junkai			Originally a robber, then stole Xue Qingling's identity and became a Marquis
Lin Yongzhong		Long Muxue			Governor of Wuping County, but actually the real Xue Qingling
Wen Kai		Bao Yucheng	only mentioned		Mayor of Liuzhou then Jiangzhou, Di Renjie's student
Xiaoyun		Yang Si			The fake Xue Qingling's lover, but actually a secret police
Zhang Yi		Wang Peng			Lin Yongzhong's servant
Jinniang		Xue Zibin			Lin Yongzhong's daughter
Du Er		Yang Ming			The leading servant in the Marquis Mansion
Wang Kai			Fu Jun		Duke of Guiyi
Wang Qiang			Song Chuyan		Wang Kai's younger brother
Fang Zhe			Yang Zengyuan		Senior General in the Longwu Guard Army
Wei'er			Guan Yue		Wang Qiang's wife
Xiaotao			Ran Yuan		A leader of a criminal group in Liangzhou
Feng Yang			Zhao Liang		Senior General of Right Baotao Guard Army
Lu Jiying			Zhang Shuping		Governor of Shanyang County
Wen Qing			Guo Qiming		Governor of Xuyi County
He Wuqi			Zhao Junkai		Owner of a salt store
He jing			Yu Lianwei		He Wuqi's servant
Li Zijun			Qiao Hong		He Wuqi's wife
Ning Wushuang			Qu Shanshan		Widow of Li Han, an official in Ministry of Works
Feng Keyan			Wang Minggang		Vice Minister of the Works
Ge Tianba			Han Zhenhua		A landlord in Xuyi County
Yungu and Xiaoqing			Dong Xuan		Ge Tianba's twin daughters
Deng Tong			Yang Yan		Ge Tianba's subordinate
Peng Chun			Zhang Hengli		Ge Tianba's subordinate
Ge Biao			Qin Hanlei		Ge Tianba's servant
Sun Xiwang			Zhong Weihua		A tailor in Yangzhou
Yan Xiaoyu			Chai Jingjing		Sun Xiwang's wife
Yuan Qi			Qian Yanqiu		Prince of Ying, the gangmaster of the Iron Hands
Long Feng			Wang Pu		A top assassin in the Iron Hands
Hu Yun			Gao Yuanfeng		A top assassin in the Iron Hands
Bao Chong			Fan Chunlei		A top assassin in the Iron Hands
Yao Chong	only mentioned		Chen Weiguo		Di Renjie's student, future chancellor
Cui Liang			Wang Xinsheng		Mayor of Yangzhou
Wu Wendeng			An Ruiyun		Deputy mayor of Yangzhou
Yang Jiucheng			Yang Jun		A official in Yangzhou in charge of the maintenance of the Grand Canal
Fang Jiu			Chen Yilin		A slender man in Yangzhou
Pang Si			Wang Liao		A slender man in Yangzhou
Di Fu	only mentioned			Su Hao	Di Renjie's servant
Wu Youde				Li Shilong	Wu Zetian's cousin, Prince of Nanping
Wu Yuanmin				Yuan Ran	Wu Youde's daughter, Princess Yingyang
Chunhong				Zheng Nan	Wu Yuanmin's Maid of Honor
Sharhan				Fu Jun	A Persian official who manages gold and silver instruments for Wu Zetian
Yaka and Saiban				Fu Jun	Sharhan's triplet brothers
Ms. Zhong				Liu Lei	Sharhan's wife
Ta Ke				Gao Peng	Sharhan's servant
Tie Le				Gao Qiushan	Sharhan's subordinate
Feng Huang				Dai Yunxia	Commander of Wu Zetian's secret police agency
Chaichi				Zhang Hongzhen	King of the Yuezhi Kingdom
Nalu				Li Xi'er	Queen of the Yuezhi Kingdom
Weita				Zhang Guohua	A prince in Yuezhi Kingdom
Qiongta				Liu Wendi	A princess in Yuezhi Kingdom
Zhong Jie				Fu Jun	Chancellor of Yuezhi Kingdom
Jin Yucui				Yan Lu	An assassin based in Nie's Hotel
Helu				Wang Xinsheng	A prince in Tujue
Qi Ge		only mentioned		Qian Yanqiu	A Turk general, Helu's follower
Ferghana (Bahanna)				Chen Yilin	The crowned prince in Tujue
Zhao Yongrong				Zhao Junkai	An officer who manages military supplies in Hexi Corridor, Wu Youde's cousin
Wulezhi				Yang Zengyuan	A Turkic assassin, Helu's bodyguard
Buzhen				Yang Zengyuan	Jiwangjue Khagan who surrendered to the Tang dynasty
Fujiwara				Zhan Xiangchi	The senior kentōshi from Japan
Arinori Rie				Suzuki Miki	A kentōshi from Japan working in the Ministry of Wars
Yoshinori Gumaro				Zheng Cheng	A kentōshi from Japan working in the Ministry of Wars
Bushan				Wang Peng	Chancellor of the Tujue Khanate
Maola				Wang Guoping	Chancellor of the Tujue Khanate
Jieliedian				Li Zhen	A Turkic general following Ferghana
Li Yong				Li Jianyang	A silversmith in Luoyang
Kasa				A Xian	A general from Tokhara Kingdom
