= Hengdian =

Hengdian may refer to:

- Hengdian, Zhejiang, a town in Dongyang, Zhejiang, China
- Hengdian World Studios, film studio in Hengdian, Dongyang, Zhejiang, China
- Hengdian East Railway Station, railway station on the Shijiazhuang–Wuhan High-Speed Railway in China
- Hengdian Group, abbreviated as HG, is a Chinese private conglomerate founded by Xu Wenrong in 1975 in Hengdian, Zhejiang, China
