= Amazing Detective Di Renjie 2 =

- DVD cover art
- Also known as: Shen Tan Di Renjie 2
- Traditional Chinese: 神探狄仁傑2
- Simplified Chinese: 神探狄仁杰2
- Hanyu Pinyin: Shén Tàn Dí Rénjié Èr
- Genre: detective fiction, historical drama, gong'an fiction, crime fiction
- Written by: Qian Yanqiu
- Directed by: Qian Yanqiu
- Presented by: Zhu Tong; Gao Xiaoping; Rong Wen
- Starring: Liang Guanhua; Zhang Zijian; Lü Zhong
- Opening theme: "Chang Ge Yi Qu" (长歌一曲) performed by Tengger
- Country of origin: China
- Original language: Mandarin
- No. of episodes: 40

Production
- Executive producers: Wang Guohui; Xue Wenchi; Fu Si; Zhang Xiaojie; Yuan Yuan; Yang Guoguang; Lu Xiaoping
- Producers: Zhang Wenling; Li Changjiang; Zhao Gang
- Production location: China
- Cinematography: Zhang Yuan
- Editor: Du Li
- Running time: 45 minutes per episode

Original release
- Network: CCTV-8
- Release: 20 November 2006

Amazing Detective Di Renjie 2, also known as Shen Tan Di Renjie 2, is the second installment in a four-season Chinese television series based on gong'an detective stories related to Di Renjie, a Tang dynasty magistrate and statesman. Written and directed by Qian Yanqiu, the series starred Liang Guanhua as the titular protagonist, and was first broadcast on CCTV-8 on 20 November 2006, two years after the first season. It was followed by Amazing Detective Di Renjie 3 in 2008, and Mad Detective Di Renjie in 2010. The series was released in the United States on March 21, 2018, on Toku.

== Plot ==
The plot is divided into three parts as follows:

1. Bian Guan Yi Ying (边关疑影), covering episodes 1 to 13.
2. She Ling (蛇灵), covering episodes 14 to 29.
3. Xue Se Jiang Zhou (血色江州), covering episodes 30 to 40.

== Cast ==
- Liang Guanhua as Di Renjie
- Zhang Zijian as Li Yuanfang
- Lü Zhong as Wu Zetian
- Jiang Xinyan as Di Ruyan (Su Xian'er)
- Xu Qian as Zeng Tai
- Xu Xiaobei as Ilterish Qaghan
- Qiao Hong as Xiao Qingfang
- Zhao Zhigang as Di Chun
- Yan Yansheng as Wang Xiaojie
- Jiang Changyi as Li Kaigu
- Song Chuyan as Zhao Wenhui
- Zhang Chengxiang as Qiu Jing
- Huo Ercha as Quan Shancai
- Liang Kai as Zhang Huan
- Jia Yanfeng as Li Lang
- Deng Wei as Mochuo
- Cong Shan as Huang Zhen
- Zhao Zhongwei as Li Changhe
- Zhou Ying as Su Honghui
- Li Xijing as Harile
- Du Gang as Song Wuji
- Yuan Peng as General Sun
- Meng Lingfei as Yang Fang
- Liu Jihe as Renkuo
- An Qi'er as Wu Qishi
- Shao Yongcheng as Zhang Jianzhi
- Fu Hongjun as Wu Sansi
- Gao Peng as Zhu Feng
- Yang Zengyuan as Daleha
- Chen Lei as Wang Tiehan
- Shao Wanlin as Yuan Tiangang
- Shi Liming as Huang Shengyan
- Zhang Ping as Jingkong
- Ji Jun as Wu Xiang
- Qu Wenting as Su Xian'er's decoy
- Chunyu Shanshan as Hui Wenzhong
- Shu Yan as Xiaomei / Xiaofeng
- Li Shilong as Lu Cheng
- Su Gang as Huan Bin
- Yu Lianwei as Tujueying
- Xu Shengxia as Abbot
- Zhao Junkai as Xue Qinglin
- Xie Zibin as Jinniang
- Wang Xinsheng as Li Xian
- Long Muxue as Lin Yongzhong
- Bao Yucheng as Wen Kai
- Yang Si as Xiaoyun
- Chen Jidong as Zhang Xiangong
- Fu Xuebin as Ge Bin
- Pan Yaochu as Wu Si
- Wang Peng as Zhang Yi
- Xing Ying as Lanxiang
- Qi Jingbin as Feng Wanchun
- Wu Mo'ai as Wu Shun
- Lu Tao as Huang Wenyue
- Wu Xiangqi as Xiaohui
- Yang Ming as Du Er
