= Zhang Zijian (actor) =

Chinese actor (born 1968)

- Born: October 28, 1968 (age 57); Tianjin, China
- Education: Beijing Film Academy
- Occupation: Actor
- Spouse(s): Li Ting (div. 2005) Fang Yun (m. 2007)

Zhang Zijian (Chinese: 张子健) is a Chinese actor.

He graduated from Beijing Film Academy, after which he formed a trio with director and fellow alumnus Qian Yanqiu and Liang Guanhua. The trio primarily starred in the Amazing Detective Di Renjie series (in which he starred as bodyguard Li Yuanfang) and the Yan Shuangying series (in which he starred as the titular protagonist). The trio separated in 2012 after Liang left due to creative differences.

== Filmography ==
=== Film ===
Year	English title	Chinese title	Role
1994	Lying Hero	大话英雄	Lu Yiqing
1994		感光时代	Ma Yiming
1998		真假英雄兄弟情	Mao Zhixin
1999		李知凡太太	Cousin
2000		恋爱季节	Li Tie
2001	Rich and Poor	贫与富	Li Su
2002		背水一战	Pan Guoqiang
2003	My Tears in Your Eyes	你的眼中我的泪	Liu Rui
2009	Iron Flow 1949	铁流1949	Liu Tiezhu

=== Television ===
Year	English title	Chinese title	Role
1993		白眉大侠	Wang Shun
1995		孔繁森	Li Jianguo
1995	Sister Gan Nineteen	甘十九妹	Yin Jianping
1996		燃情四季	Qu Ping
1996		胡雪岩	Tan Zeyun
1996		百姓1	Zheng Liqiu
1997		寇老西儿	Song Zhenzong
1997		风生水起·股市篇	Bo Tao
1998		半把剪刀	Situ Dan
1999		人鬼情缘	Lu Zikai
1999	True Love	挚爱	Han Ling
2000	Sun Zi Bing Fa Yu San Shi Liu Ji	孙子兵法与三十六计	Gongsun Yue
2000		百姓2	Zheng Liqiu
2000		完全婚姻手册之老公自家好	Sun Heng
2000		情义英雄武二郎	Ximen Qing
2001		白板	Zhou Yunting
2001	Hero	英雄	Yan Shuangying
2002		纽约丽人	Xundalu
2003	Amazing Detective Di Renjie	神探狄仁杰	Li Yuanfang
2003		英雄时代	Lu Chengwei
2004		绝胜天良	Xue Shan
2004		冬至	Dai Wei
2004		香气迷人	Fang Zhengwen
2004		大宋惊世传奇	Zhan Zhao
2004		小巷总理	Xia Zhiyuan
2005	Initiating Prosperity	开创盛世	Li Jiancheng
2005	Amazing Detective Di Renjie 2	神探狄仁杰2	Li Yuanfang
2005		王昭君	Zhang Zixian
2006		鼓上蚤时迁	Luan Tingyu
2006	Ming Dynasty in 1566	大明王朝1566	Li Shizhen
2006		案发现场2	Guo Zijian
2006		大槐树	Su Peiwen
2006	The Password of Marriage	婚姻密码	Chi Ming
2006		采桑子	Liao Shiji
2007	Amazing Detective Di Renjie 3	神探狄仁杰3	Li Yuanfang
2007	Expressway of First Empire	大秦直道	Li Si
2008	No. 1 Speed	第一速度	Qi Haonan
2008	The Falcon 1949	猎鹰1949	Yan Shuangying
2009	Mad Detective Di Renjie	神断狄仁杰	Li Yuanfang
2010	Borrow Gun	借枪	Anderson
2011	Flying Tiger Condor	飞虎神鹰	Yan Shuangying
2012	Island Falcon	孤岛飞鹰	Yan Shuangying
2012	Plain Beacon	平原烽火	Luo Jinbao
2014	Desert Sharpshooter	大漠枪神	Yan Shuangying
2015	Dare Stone Male Tiandong	石敢当之雄峙天东	Shi Gandang
2015	Detective Bao Zheng	神探包青天	Bao Zheng; Bao Tieshan
2015	Flying Tigers	飞虎队	Liu Hong
2015		热血	Qin Hao
2015	Fight on the Tip	刀尖上的搏杀	Su Wen
2016		小丈夫	Sun Zhian
2017	My Physical Education Teacher	我的！体育老师	Zhao Ling
2017	Jinmen Falcon	津门飞鹰	Yan Shuangying
2018		军人使命	Qing Tao
2018		暗刃	Xiao Chuhan
2020	Perfect Village	最美的乡村	Na Wenbin
2020		秋官课院之狄仁杰浮世传奇	Iron Prince
2021	A Land So Rich In Beauty	江山如此多娇	Chen Busheng
2021		输赢	Lin Zhenwei
2021		勇敢的心2	Ouyang Zhengde
2021		上海五虎	Qian Zhengdong
2022	The Investigator	简言的夏冬	Qin Ke
2022	Strange Tales of Tang Dynasty	唐朝诡事录	Pei Jian
2022	Song of the Moon	月歌行	Wanwuxianweng
2022	Unchained Love	浮图缘	Bu Yu Lu
2023	Choice Husband	择君记	Qin Zuze
2023		爱的品格	Fan Hua
2023	Uncle Kurban and His Descendants	库尔班大叔和他的子孙们	Ke Youtian
2023	Son of Hero	惊天岳雷	Qin Hui
2024	Sword and Fairy	又见逍遥	Lin Tiannan
2024	Lost Identity	孤战迷城	Wen Yishan
