= Qu Shanshan =

Chinese actress (born 1982)

- Born: May 21, 1982 (age 44); Changchun, Jilin
- Education: Beijing Dance Academy; Central Academy of Drama
- Occupation: Actress
- Years active: 2008–present
- Spouse: Huang Haibo (m. 2014)

Qu Shanshan (Chinese: 曲栅栅) is a Chinese actress.

She graduated from Beijing Dance Academy in 1999 and Central Academy of Drama in 2005. Her first notable role was in Qian Yanqiu's Detective Di Renjie series in 2008.

In 2024, she starred alongside Ashton Chen and Bao Bei'er in Qin Pengfei's Chinese action movie Black Storm.

== Filmography ==
=== Film ===
Year	English title	Chinese title	Role
2005		水之北	Xiaoyu
2005		疯狂的玫瑰	Xiao Ran
2005		篮球宝贝	Liu Xiaofei
2005		墩子的故事	Juanzi
2012		葡峰山下小村官	Wu Xiao
2024	Black Storm	打黑	Cheng Lin

=== Television ===
Year	English title	Chinese title	Role
2008	Amazing Detective Di Renjie 3	神探狄仁杰3	Ning Wushuang
2009	The Falcon 1949	猎鹰1949	Zhao Yaqin
2010	Mad Detective Di Renjie	神断狄仁杰	Di Ruyan
2012	Plain Beacon	平原烽火	Zhang Yuncui
2012	Flying Tiger Condor	飞虎神鹰	Juzi
2012	Island Falcon	孤岛飞鹰	Yan Yunyao
2014	Desert Sharpshooter	大漠枪神	Lihui; Xiaoling
2015		神探包青天	Gan Qiuniang; Zhao Yu
2017	Demon Catcher Zhong Kui	钟馗捉妖记	Xian Yu
2018	The Way We Were	归去来	Liu Caiqi
2019	The Longest Day in Chang'an	长安十二时辰	Xu Hezi
2021	Hunter	猎狼者	Ding Jie
2021	The Last Goodbye to Mama	您好! 母亲大人	Ding Bixia
2021	Ark Peace	和平之舟	Jiang Junbo
2022		你安全吗?	Shen Qing
2023	The Knockout	狂飙	Cheng Cheng
2023	Warm and Sweet	温暖的甜蜜的	Chen Chen
2024	Our Days	好团圆	Dadou Ma
2025	The Secret Path	绝密较量	Liu Lijing

== Personal life ==
She married actor Huang Haibo in 2014. Their son was born on August 6, 2015, in Beijing.
