= Flesh and Spirit =

Flesh and Spirit may refer to:

- Flesh and Spirit (TV series), a 2018 Chinese television series
- Flesh and Spirit (film), a 1922 American silent drama film
- Flesh and Spirit (painting), a c. 1982–83 painting by Jean-Michel Basquiat
