= Xu Wenrong =

Founder of multi-billion dollar Chinese conglomerate company

- Wenrong interviewed by Yicai in 2017
- Born: 1935 (age 90–91); Dongyang, Zhejiang, China
- Occupation: Entrepreneur

Xu Wenrong (simplified Chinese: 徐文荣; traditional Chinese: 徐文榮, born 1935) is a Chinese entrepreneur and film studio investor. He is the founder of Hengdian Group, a private conglomerate based in Hengdian, Zhejiang. Xu was the president and chairman of Hengdian Group until 2001 and is now retired. He was one of China's first billionaires, making his fortune in textiles, electronics, chemicals and pharmaceuticals in the 1990s.

Xu is best known for his founding of the world's largest outdoor film studio site, Hengdian World Studios. He is widely credited with elevating the small town of Hengdian into a prominent destination for the film, television, and cultural tourism industries. A former farmer, Xu is a forerunner in China's generation of farmer entrepreneurs who opened factories to help lift themselves and others out of poverty during the period of reform and opening up. Xu is also seen as a founding father to China's Township and Village Enterprise system and is highly regarded for his contributions to Hengdian town's economic growth and infrastructure development.

== Early life ==
Xu Wenrong was born in Dongyang, Zhejiang in 1935. He grew up in Hengdian town, at the time a poverty-stricken farming village. He was a primary school dropout, leaving school when he was just 13 years old, due to poverty and the misfortune of spending his childhood years during the wars (the anti-Japanese war from 1938 to 1945 followed by the civil war until 1949).

== Career ==
In the early 1970s, Xu Wenrong was a cadre in the local commune and later went on to hold the party secretary post of Hengdian town. His first break came when he convinced locals of the town to lend him $6000 to open a village enterprise to produce silk, promising that he would double their money within three years. Since then, Xu has been called the "farmer's entrepreneur," and was a trailblazer in the first generation of township entrepreneurs during China's reform and opening up.

In the 1990s, he began making components for electronics, such as semiconductors and circuit boards, then opened a company producing magnetic materials before diversifying into making chemicals.

In 1996, Xu founded Hengdian World Studios, one of the largest film studios in the world, after seeing opportunity in China's booming domestic tourism industry. In 1995, he met with the film director Xie Jin, who was preparing to shoot his acclaimed film The Opium War, a movie about China's humiliating loss to the British in 1842. Xie had top-level backing from the government for his film, a big propaganda effort, but he couldn't find an outdoor lot for nineteenth-century street scenes. After Xu proposed he could build the set from scratch, Xie accepted and Xu built the set.

Hengdian World Studios is now often known as "Chinawood," After Xie, other filmmakers started to use the "Opium War" lots and request Xu to construct more sets. Thus, Xu began building more replicas of famous old temples and palaces. As more film and television crews came to Hengdian to shoot, more tourists also came to visit, spurring the town's economic growth. Over 30 large-scale shooting bases and 130 high-tech studios have now been built, linking various parts of the film and television industrial chain, from production services to cinema chains to vocational education.

Xu was called a "visionary" by Bill Kong, the Hong Kong-based producer of world-wide blockbusters Hero and Crouching Tiger, Hidden Dragon, both shot in Hengdian. Kong credited Xu with turning "a place in the middle of nowhere into the best studio in China." In 1999, Xu controversially decided to offer free access to all interested film crews, a choice that one of his company's board members objected to. Eventually the decision proved prescient, attracting many film crews to the village and massively boosting the local hotel and catering industries.

In 2003, Xu resigned as president of Hengdian Group, handing over the title to his eldest son Xu Yong'an.

Continuing work into his 80s, Xu has drawn public attention for his work on the Summer Palace replica project in Hengdian. Leading up to its opening in 2015, Xu personally oversaw plans to construct a full-scale copy spanning 3.5 square kilometers of the Old Summer Palace, the Qing Dynasty imperial gardens sacked by British and French troops during the Opium War.

Yet the construction of the ambitious project soon became contentious. While representatives of the real ruins site belittled the new replica as a sell-out to tourism, some historians praised the project and Xu for preserving China's heritage. The palace replica site was finally opened in 2015.
