= Bao Guo'an =

Chinese actor and professor

- Born: 4 June 1946 (age 80); Tianjin, China
- Education: Central Academy of Drama
- Occupations: Actor, professor
- Years active: 1983–present
- Awards: 1. Flying Apsaras Award For Best Actor (1995); 2. Golden Eagle Award for Best Actor (1995)

Chinese name
- Traditional Chinese: 鮑國安
- Simplified Chinese: 鲍国安
Transcriptions
Standard Mandarin
- Hanyu Pinyin: Bào Guó-ān

Bao Guo'an (born 4 June 1946) is a Chinese actor and professor in the Central Academy of Drama. Best known for his role as Cao Cao in the 1994 television series Romance of the Three Kingdoms, Bao won two Best Actor awards at the 1995 Golden Eagle Awards and Flying Apsaras Awards. Bao was also a delegate in the National People's Congress and Chinese People's Political Consultative Conference in 2003.

== Early life and career ==
Bao has been fascinated with acting and drama since he was a child. He attended a primary school in Tianjin where most of his schoolmates were from affluent backgrounds while he was not from a wealthy family. On weekends, his schoolmates watched movies at the cinemas. Bao did not join them initially but he did so later when he felt left out, and became addicted to movies. At the time, Tianjin's cinemas were divided into three classes (A, B and C), with A screening the latest movies but having the priciest tickets. Bao could only afford to watch movies in the B and C class theatres, but he saved the allowance his parents gave him for buying snacks, and spent it at the cinema every weekend. Bao recalled watching many Soviet films at that time, including Chapaev and Lenin in 1918, and he especially enjoyed movies about heroes.

In 1960, at the age of 13, Bao gained an opportunity to appear on screen. Around the time, a performing arts group in Tianjin was making a film about a young revolutionary martyr, Liu Wenxue (刘文学), and Bao was chosen as an actor. In 1964, when the Fourth Agricultural Division of the Xinjiang Production and Construction Corps (XPCC) came to Tianjin to recruit cadres, Bao insisted that they let him join their performing arts group. Bao recalled his experience in the XPCC: "Even though I spent only five years in the Fourth Agricultural Division, I learnt a lot of things. Without this experience, I would not have been able to enter the Central Academy of Drama. Life in the military helped me develop the qualities of diligence, perseverance and courage. They have a great impact on shaping my character and personal beliefs, and on my acting career." Five years later, in 1969, Bao was transferred to another group in Zhumadian, Henan, where he worked as an actor and director.

== The Mountain Below is Home ==
In 1978, Bao was accepted into the Central Academy of Drama and, due to excellent performance, was asked to remain and teach there after his graduation. Around the time, the Pearl River Film Company (珠江电影制片公司) was holding auditions in Beijing for the film The Mountain Below is Home (山下是故乡). By chance, Bao was acting in a stage play in Beijing when he was noticed by the director Liu Hongming (刘洪铭) and was selected to play the lead character "Chang Mao". Although Bao has been watching movies since childhood, he had no clue to the process behind acting in a film. He requested to be given a chance to personally experience rural life so that he can prepare better for his role. A month before shooting began, the producers sent Bao to the countryside in You County, Hunan, where he lived among villagers and did menial labour. Bao recalled that when he returned home after working on the film for more than half a year, his appearance had changed so much that his son could not recognise him.

== The Opium War ==
In 1997, Bao was cast as Lin Zexu in Xie Jin's historical epic film The Opium War, which won the 1997 Golden Rooster and the 1998 Hundred Flowers awards for Best Picture. To prepare for the role, Bao travelled to Lin Zexu's hometown of Fuzhou to experience life there. Apart from that, every morning when he woke up, he would imagine himself as Lin Zexu and try to adjust his thoughts and personality to fit his character's.

== Zhen Xin ==
In 2001, Bao played the lead role in Zhen Xin (真心; True Heart), a biographical film about Wu Dengyun (吴登云; b. 1939), a medical doctor known for helping to improve healthcare in Ulugqat County, Xinjiang. Bao commented, "If Lin Zexu was an example of a firm and assertive hero, then Wu Dengyun is a kind and tender hero." Zhen Xin was shot in the Pamir Mountains at an altitude of 5,000m. Bao suffered from severe high blood pressure and during the descent he had to be carried, wearing an oxygen mask and on IV drip. Recalling this incident, he said, "I almost lost my life in making this movie." As Bao was very absorbed into his role, he would feel like crying each time he sees Wu Dengyun, with whom he has developed a close friendship, and when he is reminded of Wu's daughter. He said, "After Wu Dengyun's daughter died, her body was transferred to the morgue in the hospital where Wu Dengyun worked. Every night, he would light a lamp and go to the morgue to see his daughter. This is the "tender" side of the hero Wu Dengyun! Until today it still moves me deeply."

== Romance of the Three Kingdoms ==
Although Bao has portrayed heroes and protagonists many times on screen, his best known role to date, however, is that of an antagonist — "Cao Cao" in Romance of the Three Kingdoms, a 1994 television series based on the classical novel of the same title. Before shooting started, Bao told the producers that he wanted his portrayal of the character to be "answerable to his family and audiences". He was very focused and diligent in preparing for his role, doing extensive research and spending long periods of time pondering over his character. Bao decided not to limit himself to the traditional image of Cao Cao as a villain, so he based his Cao Cao on his personal interpretation of the character in the novel and the Cao Cao described in historical texts. Bao's performance in Romance of the Three Kingdoms propelled him to fame and earned him two Best Actor awards at the 1995 Golden Eagle Awards and Flying Apsaras Awards. After Romance of the Three Kingdoms, Bao promised himself never to act in historical-themed productions again, but ironically, he found himself receiving and accepting more offers to play historical figures in films and television. He commented on this, "Cao Cao got me overwhelmed!".

== Initiating Prosperity ==
In 2005, Bao played the tyrannical Emperor Yang of the Sui dynasty in the television series Initiating Prosperity (开创盛世; The Opening of an Age of Prosperity). He wanted to reject the offer for the role but found it hard because the director and producers were his old friends. In one scene, the emperor is shown shedding tears when sending off his daughter to a distant land to marry a Tujue leader. Bao recalled that he had never been so emotional in any of his previous projects except for Zhen Xin. Bao commented, "He was an emperor but he was also a person! No matter how bad he was, he was still flesh and blood." Bao later revealed that he had imagined Emperor Yang's daughter as his young granddaughter, so he could not hold back his tears at the thought of his granddaughter leaving him. Bao also explained that he wanted to present a complete, three-dimensional, vivid, and historically accurate portrayal of Emperor Yang, which boils down to his flamboyant costumes, as the emperor was known for his extravagance.

== Current work ==
Apart from teaching at the Central Academy of Drama as a professor, Bao continues to remain active in the entertainment industry although he hardly plays leading roles now. Bao mentioned that as he grew older he felt that he has become more mature in his career. He once said that an actor should take precautions not to "slip" as age catches up with him, because if he "slips" he would lose his "explosive power" in acting.

== Filmography ==
=== Film ===
Year	English title	Chinese title	Role	Notes
1983	Hometown at the Foot of the Mountain	山下是故乡	Chang Mao	
1986	Decision	决策		
1990	The Atmospheric Layer Vanishes	大气层消失	Siberian tiger	voice acting
1997	The Opium War	鴉片戰爭	Lin Zexu	
1999	Zero O'Clock Action	零点行动	Wei Feng	
2001	True Love	真心	Wu Dengyun (older)	
2002	The Love of a Policewoman	警之恋		TV film
2003	The Injustice to Dou E	竇娥冤	Dou Tianzhang	TV film
2004	Invincible Army of Nuclear Power	核电铁军	Li Zihua	TV film
2010	Sacrifice	趙氏孤兒	Zhao Dun	
2013	Shandong Brothers	山东兄弟	Professor Wang	
2013	To the Sea	山外是海	Old Shen	
2018	The Story of Qianyuan	乾元苍穹	Secretary Liu	

=== TV dramas ===
Year	English title	Original title	Role	Notes
1984	Outlaws of the Marsh	水滸傳	Song Jiang	
1991	The Great Prime Minister of Tang	大唐名相	Wei Zheng	
1994	Romance of the Three Kingdoms	三國演義	Cao Cao	
1995	Wu Zetian	武則天	Emperor Taizong of Tang	
1997	Sun Wu	孫武	King Liao of Wu	
1998	Law of This World	人间正道	Wu Mingxiong	
1998	The Strange Case of Double Phoenix	雙鳳奇案	Du Hanzhang	
1999	Female Prisoners	女囚	Liang Tianyu	
2000	The Emperor's Teacher, Liu Bowen	帝師劉伯溫	Liu Bowen	
2001	Peach Flowers in a Turbulent Age	亂世桃花	Li Yuan	
2001	Lord Bao's Life and Death Calamity	包公生死劫	Bao Zheng	
2002	Wind, Rain, Heaven and Earth	风雨乾坤	Sima Minwang	
2002	The Director of People's Congress	人大主任	Qi Hengshou	
2002	Rescuing Juvenile Offenders	拯救少年犯	Bao Wentong	
2003	The Affaire in the Swing Age	江山風雨情	Hong Chengchou	
2003	Naked Snow	裸雪	Cao Zhong	
2003	Changping of the War	鐵血長平	King Zhaoxiang of Qin	
2004	So Rich in Beauty	如此多嬌	Lin Ran	
2004	The Execution of Chen Shimei	新鍘美案	Bao Zheng	
2004	Undercover Light and Shadow	无间光影	Xu Nuo	
2005	The Emperor of Great Ming	大明天子	Hongwu Emperor	
2005	Refusing Maturity	拒绝成熟	Scribe	
2005	National Secret	国家机密	Mr. Xiao	
2005	The Rebirth of a King	越王勾踐	Wu Zixu	
2005	Initiating Prosperity	開創盛世	Emperor Yang of Sui	
2005	Ren Changxia	任长霞		
2006	The Naval Story	船政風雲	Zuo Zongtang	
2006	For Truly Great Men	数风流人物	Lin Ran	
2006	Big Locust Tree	大槐树	Hongwu Emperor	
2006	A Legend of Shaolin Kungfu	少林寺傳奇	Shaolin abbot	
2007	The Legend of Xin Zhui	辛追傳奇	Xiao He	
2007	Major Case Squad	大案组	Mr. Zhang	
2008	Pathfinding to the Northeast	闖關東	Tan Yongqing	
2008	The Peacocks Fly to the Southeast	孔雀東南飛	Liu's father	
2009	Venture	创业	Mayor Ye	
2009	Broad Sky, Boundless Land	苍天厚土	Shi Xinyuan	
2009	Wuliang Sky	无量天	Liu Keqian	
2009	Oriental Casablanca	東方卡薩布蘭卡	Fang Tianting	
2010	Ice Is Water Asleep	冰是睡着的水	Feng Yunshan	
2010	Liu Sanjie	劉三姐	Liu Zhiyuan	
2010	A Legend of Shaolin Kungfu 2	少林寺傳奇2	Shaolin abbot	
2011	Brother Foes	狹路兄弟	Huang Sidie	
2011	Wonder Mom	极品妈妈	An Yuan	
2012	Sunny	风和日丽	Yin Zegui	
2012	Secret Battles in Emei	密戰峨嵋	Wu Shi	
2012	Clever Little Kongkong	聰明小空空	Abbot	
2012	Crossing the Border	越境	Army commander	
2012	Special Arms	利刃出鞘	Gao Shiwei	
2013	Sleek Rat, the Challenger	白玉堂之局外局	Bao Zheng	
2015	History's Mission	歷史的使命	Tang Guanhong	
2015	The Legend of Li Bing	李冰傳奇	King Huiwen of Qin	
2016	The Identity of Father	父親的身份	Zhang Hanmin	
2017	A Legend of Shaolin Kungfu 4	少林寺傳奇4	Abbot	
