= Flesh and Spirit (TV series) =

- Traditional Chinese: 靈與肉
- Simplified Chinese: 灵与肉
- Hanyu Pinyin: Líng Yǔ Ròu
- Genre: Historical, romantic comedy
- Based on: Flesh and Spirit by Zhang Xianliang
- Written by: Yang Zhenjian
- Directed by: Lou Jian
- Starring: Yu Xiaowei; Sun Qian
- Country of origin: China
- Original language: Mandarin
- No. of seasons: 1
- No. of episodes: 42

Production
- Executive producers: Qin Zhengui; Yang Hongtao
- Production locations: Yinchuan, Ningxia
- Production company: China Central Television

Original release
- Network: CCTV-8
- Release: 17 June – 30 June 2018

Flesh and Spirit (Chinese: 灵与肉) is a 2018 Chinese television series. It is based on the Chinese novel of the same name by Zhang Xianliang. The series is directed by Lou Jian and stars Yu Xiaowei and Sun Qian as the main characters. The 42 episode drama premiered on CCTV-8 on 17 June 2018. The series focuses on the life of Xu Lingjun, a sent-down youth in Helan Mountains during the Down to the Countryside Movement. The series was ranked first in the ratings in June 2018.

== Cast ==
=== Main ===
- Yu Xiaowei as Xu Lingjun (许灵均)
- Sun Qian as Li Xiuzhi (李秀芝)

=== Supporting ===
- Shang Tielong as Guo Shanzi
- Li Xinmin as Lao Baigan
- Huang Xiaolei as Huang Juhua
- Zhao Yi as Sun Jianli
- Wang Weiguang as Xie Goulai
- Zhao Ningning as Jiang Wenming
- Wang Quanyou as Cao Shouyi
- Tian Ling as Liang Dasang
- Wang Jingyun as He Lin
- Mu Huaihu as Laomei
- Wu Jian as Qian Youwei
- Zhang Hui as Hu Ziwen
- Qin Han as Xu Jingyou
- Qi Yunpeng as Dong Changsheng
- Hou Xuelong as Bai Yu
- Su Yueqing as Cao Binbin
- Teng Yufei as Zhang Mazi

== Soundtrack ==
| No. | Title | Lyrics | Music | Singer(s) | Length |
|---|---|---|---|---|---|
| 1. | "Flesh and Spirit (灵与肉)" (Ending theme) | Chen Tao | Wang Bei | Han Lei |

== Ratings ==
| Date | CCTV-8 CSM52 city ratings | | |
| Date | Ratings (%) | Audience share (%) | Rank |
|---|---|---|---|
| 2018.6.17 | 0.827 | 3.245 | 2 |
| 2018.6.18 | 0.926 | 3.466 | 3 |
| 2018.6.19 | 1.115 | 4.272 | 1 |
| 2018.6.20 | 1.026 | 3.979 | 1 |
| 2018.6.21 | 1.126 | 4.373 | 1 |
| 2018.6.22 | 1.174 | 4.271 | 1 |
| 2018.6.23 | 1.176 | 4.335 | 1 |
| 2018.6.24 | 1.214 | 4.549 | 1 |
| 2018.6.25 | 1.248 | 4.917 | 1 |
| 2018.6.26 | 1.286 | 5.252 | 1 |
| 2018.6.27 | 1.351 | 5.511 | 1 |
| 2018.6.28 | 1.305 | 5.269 | 1 |
| 2018.6.29 | 1.3 | 5.207 | 1 |
| 2018.6.30 | 1.339 | 5.132 | 1 |
