= Liang Guanhua =

Chinese actor (born 1964)

- 梁冠华
- Born: 30 September 1964 (age 61); Beijing, China
- Education: Beijing People's Art Theatre
- Occupation: Actor
- Years active: 1982–present
- Agent: Tianyu Media
- Spouse: Tang Ye

Chinese name
- Traditional Chinese: 梁冠華
- Simplified Chinese: 梁冠华
Transcriptions
Standard Mandarin
- Hanyu Pinyin: Liáng Guànhuá

Liang Guanhua (Chinese: 梁冠华; born 30 September 1964) is a Chinese actor best known for his role as Di Renjie on Amazing Detective Di Renjie and its sequels.

== Early life and education ==
Liang was born in Beijing on 30 September 1964. In 1981, he was accepted to Beijing People's Art Theatre. After graduating in 1984, he joined the theatre as an actor.

== Acting career ==
Liang became widely known to audiences with The Happy Life of Talkative Zhang Damin (1998), in which he played in the lead role of Zhang Damin.

In 2003, Liang's big break came when Qian Yanqiu cast him in Amazing Detective Di Renjie, in which he played Di Renjie, a role which brought him much publicity. He reprised in three sequels, Amazing Detective Di Renjie 2, Amazing Detective Di Renjie 3, and Amazing Detective Di Renjie 4.

In 2004, he had a supporting role in the historical television series Xianfeng Dynasty: Fantasies Behind A Curtain. That same year, he had a minor role in the black comedy film Keep Cool, starring Li Baotian, Jiang Wen, Ge You and Qu Ying and directed by Zhang Yimou.

Liang landed a guest starring role on Crazy Dinner Party in 2012, opposite actors Fan Wei, Huang Bo, Liu Hua, and Monica Mok.

In 2014, he portrayed Bao Zheng in the wuxia television series The Three Heroes and Five Gallants.

Liang joined the main cast of the biographical television series Yuan Chonghuan as Wei Zhongxian, a court eunuch and villain role of the series.

In 2019, he starred with Yao Chen, Yuan Hong and Li Jiuxiao in Send Me to the Clouds. That same year, he gained national fame for his starring role as Hongxi Emperor in the television series Ming dynasty, adapted from Lianjing Zhuyi's network novel The Chronicle of the Six Eras.

== Personal life ==
Liang married Tang Ye (唐烨), an actress who also worked at Beijing People's Art Theatre.

== Filmography ==
=== Film ===
Year	English title	Chinese title	Role	Notes
1985	Charming Band	迷人的乐队	Zhang Kuiwu	
1988	Behind the Gold Plaque	金匾背后	Yin Long	
1988	Silly Manager	傻冒经理	A passenger	
1989		村路带我回家	Pan Yu	
1991	Spring without Regret	青春无悔	Fatty	
1991	Mandala	曼荼罗	President Ma	
1992	Divorce Wars	离婚大战	Guest	
1996	Fire in The Sun	太阳火	Kong Gaocheng	
1996		舞潮	Journalist	
2000	The Ordinary People's Life	美丽的家	Zhang Damin	
2002	There is a Sun Every Day	天天有太阳	He Dayou	
2002	Fool in Love	爱情傻瓜	The broker	
2004	Keep Cool	有话好好说	Bar manager	
2004		皆大欢喜	Boss of a bar	
2004		郎红	The senior fellow apprentice	
2004	Midnight Murder	午夜凶案	Fatty	
2006		抬头见喜	Manager Cheng	
2012	Crazy Dinner Party	饭局也疯狂	Old Mei	
2019	Send Me to the Clouds	送我上青云	Li Ping	

=== Television ===
Year	English title	Chinese title	Role	Notes
1985	Zhen San	甄三	Zhen San (young)	
1989		荒原城堡731	Xu Teng	
1990		渴望	Da Tou	
1991	Urban Heroine	都市英雄	Xi Zi	
1991		夜深沉	Foolish Man Wang	
1991	Stories from the Editorial Board	编辑部的故事	Master Wang	
1996	Father and Son of the Ma Family	二马	Li Zirong	
1996	Kingdoms of the Spring and Autumn Period of the Eastern Zhou Dynasty	东周列国春秋篇	Gongsun Wuzhi	
1998		烟雨红尘	Hu Sihai	
1998	The Happy Life of Talkative Zhang Damin	贫嘴张大民的幸福生活	Zhang Damin	
1998	The Vicissitudes of 1898	戊戌风云	Li Lianying	
2001	The Best Clown Under Heaven	天下第一丑	Lu Denggao	
2001	Sun Yat-sen	孙中山	Huang Xing	
2001		佛跳墙	Magistrate Bao	
2002		情感冲击线	Wen Gui	
2003		开心就好之男人无烦恼	Lu Donghua	
2003		聚宝盆	Su Bancheng	
2003		追梦谷	Liu Chenwei	
2004	Amazing Detective Di Renjie	神探狄仁杰	Di Renjie	
2004	Xianfeng Dynasty: Fantasies Behind A Curtain	咸丰王朝之一帘幽梦	An Dexin	
2005		狸猫换太子传奇	Kou Zhun	
2006	Xing Huo	星火	He Nianzu	
2006		江湖俏佳人	Liu Yitiao	
2006	Amazing Detective Di Renjie 2	神探狄仁杰2	Di Renjie	
2007	Root in the Central Plains	根在中原	Su Weidao	
2007		家事如天	Zheng Dalong	
2008	Amazing Detective Di Renjie 3	神探狄仁杰3	Di Renjie	
2009	The Falcon 1949	猎鹰1949	Boss	
2010	Lost in Los Angeles	迷失洛杉矶	Sun Ziwang	
2010	Mad Detective Di Renjie	神断狄仁杰	Di Renjie	
2010		大侦探	Wu Shiguang	
2011		护国大将军	Yuan Shikai	
2012	Flying Tiger Condor	飞虎神鹰	Du Ma	
2012		江南传奇之十五贯	Kuang Zhong	
2012	Island Falcon	孤岛飞鹰	Zhang Xiaotian	
2012	Plain Beacon	平原烽火	Deng Wenchang	
2013		养儿防老	Zhang Sanjiang	
2013	The Hunters	猎狼人	Liang Benchu	
2014	Wang Xizhi	书圣王羲之	Wang Dao	
2015		传奇大掌柜	Qian Yungui	
2016	Yuan Chonghuan	袁崇焕	Wei Zhongxian	
2016	The Three Heroes and Five Gallants	五鼠闹东京	Bao Zheng	
2016		每个人都有秘密	Sha Jinrong	
2017	Detective Dee The 4th	神探狄仁杰之情花金人案	Di Renjie	
2018		远方的家	Fu Boheng	
2019		热爱	Shang Dezhi	
2019	Ming dynasty	大明风华	Hongxi Emperor	
2020		胜算	Fu Yuan	
2022	Tianxia Changhe	天下长河	Songgotu	
TBA	Challenges at Midlife	落花时节	Zhang Lixin	

=== Drama ===
Year	English title	Chinese title	Role	Notes/Ref.
1982	Cai Wenji	蔡文姬	A soldier	
1988	Camel Xiangzi	骆驼祥子	Master Liu (Liu Siye)	
1990	Teahouse	茶馆	Liu Mazi/ Huang Pangzi	
1994	Ruan Lingyu	阮玲玉	Brother Ma	
1994	Hamlet	哈姆雷特	Hamlet	
1994		蝴蝶梦	Magistrate Gao	
2001	Cai Wenji	蔡文姬	Cao Cao	
2002		狗儿爷涅槃	Gou'er Ye	

== Awards and nominations ==
=== Drama awards ===
Year	Nominated work	Award	Result	Notes
1987	Weddings or Funerals	4th Plum Performance Award	Won	
1996		3rd Golden Lion Award	Won	
2001	Teahouse	18th Plum Performance Award	Won	

=== Film and TV awards ===
Year	Nominated work	Award	Category	Result	Notes
2000	The Happy Life of Talkative Zhang Damin	Chunyan Awards	Outstanding Actor	Won	
2002	The Happy Life of Talkative Zhang Damin	21st Flying Apsaras Awards	Outstanding Actor	Won	
2010	Xing Huo	Chunyan Awards	Best Supporting Actor	Won	
