= Apeloa Pharmaceutical =

Chinese pharmaceutical manufacturer

Apeloa Pharmaceutical Co., Ltd
- Native name: 普洛药业股份有限公司
- Type: Subsidiary
- Traded as: SZSE: 000739
- Industry: Chemicals, Pharmaceutical, Biotechnology
- Founded: 1989
- Products: APIs, FDFs, CDMO services
- Revenue: ▲¥12.02 billion (2024); ¥10.95 billion (2023)
- Owner: Hengdian Group (50.23%)
- Number of employees: 7,400+ (2025)

Apeloa Pharmaceutical Co., Ltd. (Chinese: 普洛药业股份有限公司), known as Apeloa, is a Chinese pharmaceutical manufacturer under Hengdian Group. The company is headquartered in Hengdian, Dongyang, Zhejiang, China. It was founded in 1989 and has been listed on the Shenzhen Stock Exchange since 9 May 1997 (ticker: 000739). Apeloa provides contract development and manufacturing (CDMO) services and manufactures APIs and finished dosage forms; products span cardiovascular, anti-infective, psychiatric and oncology areas.

Apeloa has 7400 employees, 8 manufacturing sites and 3 R&D centers in Boston, Shanghai and Hengdian, covering flow chemistry, synthetic biology and biocatalysis, and peptide development. It has invested over USD20 million in flow chemistry over the past ten years in an effort to advance sustainable pharmaceutical manufacturing. In Boston, its 17,000-square-foot facility does R&D related to chemistry needs in drug development, including preclinical chemistry, scale-up production and new drug development.

Apeloa Pharmaceutical has successfully passed 20 U.S. FDA inspections since 2006.

In 2022, Apeloa Pharmaceutical was one of five Chinese companies licensed to produce Pfizer's oral Covid-19 treatment for lower-income countries. The agreement was signed with the Medicines Patent Pool (MPP), an organization that aims to increase access to drugs in 95 lower-income countries.

Apeloa is a subsidiary of Hengdian Group, a major Chinese private conglomerate founded in 1975 in Hengdian, Zhejiang, with businesses spanning electronics, pharmaceuticals/healthcare, film & tourism, and modern services.

== See also ==
- Hengdian Group
- Shenzhen Stock Exchange
