= Journey to the West Afterstory =

Chinese mythology TV series

- 西游记后传
- Genre: Drama, Mythology, Fantasy
- Based on: Journey to the West by Wu Cheng'en
- Written by: Qian Yanqiu
- Directed by: Li Yuan
- Starring: Cho Wing, Lü Hanbiao, Huang Haibing, Heizi
- Opening theme: I Want to Become an Immortal (我欲成仙) performed by Liu Huan
- Ending theme: Longing (相思) performed by Mao Amin
- Country of origin: China
- Original language: Mandarin Chinese
- No. of episodes: 30

Production
- Producers: Li Yuan, Li Zhen, Wang Ling

Journey to the West Afterstory, or The Sequel to Journey to the West (simplified Chinese: 西游记后传; traditional Chinese: 西游記後傳) is a 30-episode fantasy television series directed by Li Yuan, based on the story of Journey to the West. The series mainly tells the story of Tang Sanzang and his disciples after returning from their pilgrimage to obtain scriptures. They learn that Tathāgata Buddha has passed into nirvana, and the Mara Wutian seeks to take over Three Realms, ultimately defeated by Sun Wukong who sacrifices himself. The series aired on various television stations across China in 2000.

== Cast ==
Actor	Role	Description
Cho Wing.	Sun Wukong	Victorious Fighting Buddha → South Star Great Saint Relic Honored King Buddha; One of Tang Sanzang's disciples, a character from Journey to the West, sworn brother of the Bull Demon King, formerly the Great Sage Equal to Heaven, friend of Qiao Ling'er, companion of Nezha.
Lü Hanbiao	Zhu Bajie	Jingtan Messenger Bodhisattva → Mufu Golden Lotus Buddha; One of Tang Sanzang's disciples, a character from Journey to the West, companion of Nezha.
Huang Haibing	Tang Sanzang	Jantan Merit Buddha → Immeasurable Merit Buddha; Master of Sun Wukong, Zhu Bajie and Sha Wujing, a character from Journey to the West.
Li Jing	Sha Wujing	South Star Eight Treasures Golden Body Arhat Bodhisattva → Golden Body Light King Buddha; One of Tang Sanzang's disciples, a character from Journey to the West.
Zhang Zhiwei	Little White Dragon	Eight Ministries Heavenly Dragon Broad Power Bodhisattva → Golden Body Broad Power Dragon Patriarch Buddha; Tang Sanzang's mount, able to transform into human form, son of the West Sea Dragon King, nephew of the Jing River Dragon King, a character from Journey to the West.
Wu Jian	Qiao Ling'er	Young master of Qiaojiazhuang, reincarnation of Tathāgata Buddha in the mortal world, husband of Bai Lianhua, lover of Biyou, friend of Sun Wukong.
Heizi	Wutian	Kinnara Bodhisattva → Mara → Wutian Buddha → Mara; Great Sage of the Demon Realm, lover of Axiu, formerly the great protector Jingnaluo Bodhisattva of Ubatuoluo, the White-Clothed figure who is his benevolent incarnation. Due to resentment and injustice in the Three Realms, he fell into the demonic path, replaced Tathāgata Buddha to rule the Three Realms for 33 years. Ultimately defeated by Sun Wukong who fused the 17 Śarīra relics.
Ma Yashu	Bai Lianhua	Mortal female bandit leader → White Lotus Holy Mother Bodhisattva; Wife of Qiao Ling'er, disciple of Ju Xie, later a disciple of Tang Sanzang. Kind and upright, she came to view Ju Xie as an enemy and ultimately succeeded in killing Ju Xie.
Juan Zi	Biyou	Fairy of Donghua Mountain → Dharma Protection Zen Bodhisattva; Lover of Qiao Ling'er, disciple of Emperor Donghua, later a disciple of Tang Sanzang. She loves Qiao Ling'er, once regarded Bai Lianhua as a romantic rival, but later reconciled with Bai Lianhua. Ultimately succeeded in killing Heipao.
Qiu Yue	Nezha	Third Altar Sea Meeting Great Deity; Resourceful and courageous. Companion of Sun Wukong and Zhu Bajie.
Ma Jielin	Heipao	Lord of the Great Heavenly King Hall; Snake spirit, subordinate of Wutian, Great Protector of the Demon Realm, partner of Ju Xie. Cruel and ruthless, he committed every evil. As Lord of the Great Heavenly King Hall, he brutally murdered Qiao Ling'er's entire family, making him Qiao Ling'er's enemy. Ultimately killed by Biyou.
Liu Ying	Ju Xie	Marshal of the General Hall; Scorpion spirit, subordinate of Wutian, Right Protector of the Demon Realm, partner of Heipao, master of Bai Lianhua. She appeared caring toward Bai Lianhua but was actually vicious. As Marshal of the General Hall, she used Bai Lianhua as a hostage to capture Qiao Ling'er. Ultimately met her doom at the hands of Bai Lianhua.
Shan Lianli	Ying Yao	Envoy of the Scripture Pavilion; Subordinate of Wutian, one of the protectors of the Demon Realm. A demon who cultivated inside a gourd, she possesses high magical power, is skilled with a single-bladed sword, and is resourceful. Serving as Envoy of the Scripture Pavilion, she was ultimately killed by Sun Wukong in the Scripture Pavilion.
Yu Yuexian	Wu Zhen	A female ghost who took advantage of the chaos in the underworld to escape to Chenguan Town in the mortal world. Daughter of Chen Yuankun, arrogant and malicious. She loved Qiao Ling'er but was eventually killed by Bai Lianhua.
Hao Yiping	Tathāgata	Leader of the Buddhist realm, boundless in power. When Wutian attacked, he reincarnated into the mortal world.
Fu Yujia	Guanyin	A figure in the Buddhist path, compassionate and merciful, constantly assisting Tang Sanzang and Sun Wukong.
Li Jun	Dipankara Buddha	Originator of all Dharmas. He distinguishes right from wrong and good from evil, holding an exceptional status in the Buddhist realm.

== Production staff ==
- Producer: Li Anjun
- Production team: Li Yuan, Li Zhen, Wang Ling, Fei Yun, Rong Jianlin, Li Xijing, Gao Xiaomao, Chai Wenzhi, Wang Dai, Liang Shiyan, Yang Jian
- Chief supervisors: Ren Xianliang, Yan Yiyun
- Supervisors: Ren Xianliang, Yan Yiyun, Li Yaowu
- Chief coordinator: Zhang Guolu
- Production coordinator: Wu Yi
- Art designers: Mao Huaiqing, Ma Gaiwa, Guo Yanfeng
- Literary coordinator: Wu Yuan
- Computer special effects: Bai Xiaojun, Cho Wing
- Computer production: Gong Yifan, Zhang Xiaoqiang, Qian Xuefen, Li Xin, Liu Li, Qiu Rui, Ye Deyong, Zeng Jiong, Fan Jie
- Makeup designers: Liu Xiaodong, Ma Shuying, Wang Danling, Zhao Hua, Wang Zhiguang
- Video and audio technicians: Han Chen, Zhang Yunming, Wang Xiaoming
- Headpiece designer: Jiang Longcai
- Pyrotechnics: Guo Yan
- Sound effects: Wei Jun, Hua Lanhai
- Financial coordinators: Li Jie, Yang Min
- Coordinator assistant: Li Bin

== Related ==
Cho Wing both directed and acted in this series. Prior to this, he served as action director for Journey to the West Afterstory.

In 2015, screenwriter Qian Yanqiu adapted the story of this series into another television series titled Shi Gandang: Hero of the East, which aired that year.

In March 2020, Cho Wing, the lead actor and executive director of this series, wrote, directed, and starred in the film The Monkey King: The Legend Begins, which was released in theaters.

In early 2020, Cho Wing criticized the series' head director Li Yuan, screenwriter Qian Yanqiu, and other crew members for being irresponsible in an interview, stating that the script was insufficient in length and that he had personally filmed all of the dialogue and action scenes. Qian Yanqiu subsequently responded online, vehemently criticizing Cho Wing's statements as false, accusing him of being unlearned, failing to understand the script, and bullying others. Qian also claimed that Cho Wing's re-editing and online distribution of Sequel to Journey to the West constituted copyright infringement.

== Reception ==
Director Cho Wing stated that "the number of fight scenes and the amount of special effects have doubled compared to the sequel". In reality, almost every fight scene in the series is repeated three consecutive times (including forward and reverse playback), and certain close-up shots are shown from several different camera angles. This aspect caused controversy among viewers. However, with the rise of kichiku (ghost animal) videos, Sequel to Journey to the West came to be known as the "godfather of kichiku," and non-kichiku versions focusing purely on the storyline have appeared online.

The series subverts the traditional stereotypes of Journey to the West: Sun Wukong transforms from mischievous and unruly to righteous, brave and self-sacrificing; Zhu Bajie from ugly and grotesque to handsome and dashing; Tang Sanzang from focusing solely on Buddhist theory to comprehending the true essence of martial arts; Sha Wujing from timid and weak to shouldering responsibilities and charging bravely into battle. The opening theme song I Want to Become an Immortal and the ending theme song Longing were widely praised.
