= Initiating Prosperity =

- DVD cover art
- Also known as: Kaichuang Shengshi; Xin Sui Tang Fengyun
- Traditional Chinese: 開創盛世 / 新隋唐風雲
- Simplified Chinese: 开创盛世 / 新隋唐风云
- Literal meaning: The Beginning of an Age of Prosperity / New Stories of Sui and Tang
- Hanyu Pinyin: Kāichuàng Shèngshì / Xīn Suí Táng Fēngyún
- Genre: Historical drama
- Written by: Zhang Huili
- Directed by: Wang Wenjie
- Presented by: You Xiaogang
- Starring: Shen Xiaohai; Liu Wenzhi; Zhang Zijian; Sun Feifei; Bao Guo'an
- Country of origin: China
- Original language: Mandarin
- No. of episodes: 48

Production
- Producers: Bao Haiming; Zhang Huili
- Production location: China
- Running time: 45 minutes per episode
- Production companies: Shandong Film and Drama Centre; Huihuang Shiji Company

Initiating Prosperity is a Chinese historical television series based on events in a period in Chinese history known as the Transition from the Sui dynasty to the Tang dynasty. The series was directed by Wang Wenjie and starred Shen Xiaohai, Liu Wenzhi, Zhang Zijian, Sun Feifei and Bao Guo'an. It was first broadcast on television stations in China in 2006.

== Cast ==
- Shen Xiaohai as Li Shimin
- Sun Feifei as Princess Yuerong
- Bao Guo'an as Emperor Yang of Sui
- Saren Gaowa as Empress Xiao
- Liu Guanxiong as Yuwen Shu
- Zhao Yi as Yuwen Huaji
- Lü Zhuoda as Yu Shiji
- Zhang Youfei as Gao Junya
- Li Bao'an as Wang Wei
- Zhang Fumin as Song Laosheng
- Wang Yongquan as Gao Deru
- Yu Weiping as Sang Xianhe
- Wang Jin as Sima Dekan
- Cui Binbin as Yang Tong
- Lei Kesheng as An Jiatuo
- Zhang Chengxiang as Yuan Wendu
- Du Zhiguo as Yu Zhi
- Liu Wenzhi as Emperor Gaozu of Tang
- Zhang Zijian as Li Jiancheng
- Yang Dong as Li Yuanji
- Wu Cheng as Li Zhiyun
- Li Ping as Lady Wan
- Yao Di as Lady Yuwen
- Zhang Na as Lady Yin
- Song Song as Consort Zhang
- Song Xiaona as Empress Zhangsun
- Liu Yijun as Feng Deyi
- Wang Wei as Xiao Yu
- Xie Gang as Pei Ji
- Su Zaiqiang as Liu Wenjing
- Zhang Guosheng as Qutu Tong
- Hou Yong as Wei Zheng
- Zhang Yuanrong as Zhangsun Wuji
- Hu An as Fang Xuanling
- Zhou Hao as Du Ruhui
- Zhang Wei as Yuchi Gong
- Liu Difei as Li Jing
- Bao Hailong as Qin Shubao
- Ye Erjiang as Cheng Yaojin
- Zhang Dagui as Liu Zhenghui
- Ma Jie as Hou Junji
- Huo Ercha as Shibi Khan / Jieli Khan
- Renqing Dunzhu as Tuli Khan
- Yang Fan as Zhishisili
- Wang Wensheng as Dou Jiande
- Li Qishan as Wang Shichong
- Li Zhenqi as Li Mi
- Zhang Hongtao as Duan Da
- Guo Changhui as Wang Bodang
- Senge as Wu Duan'er
- Xia Tian as Xue Rengao
- Min Xiding as Chen Si
- Zhang Mengxing as Yuanzhen
- Liu Fengxue as Yuanli
- Jin Hanning as Dugu An
- Li Feng as Dugu Benxin
- Deng Ming as Linghu Da
- Shi Lei as Hu Er
