= Hengdian Group =

Chinese conglomerate

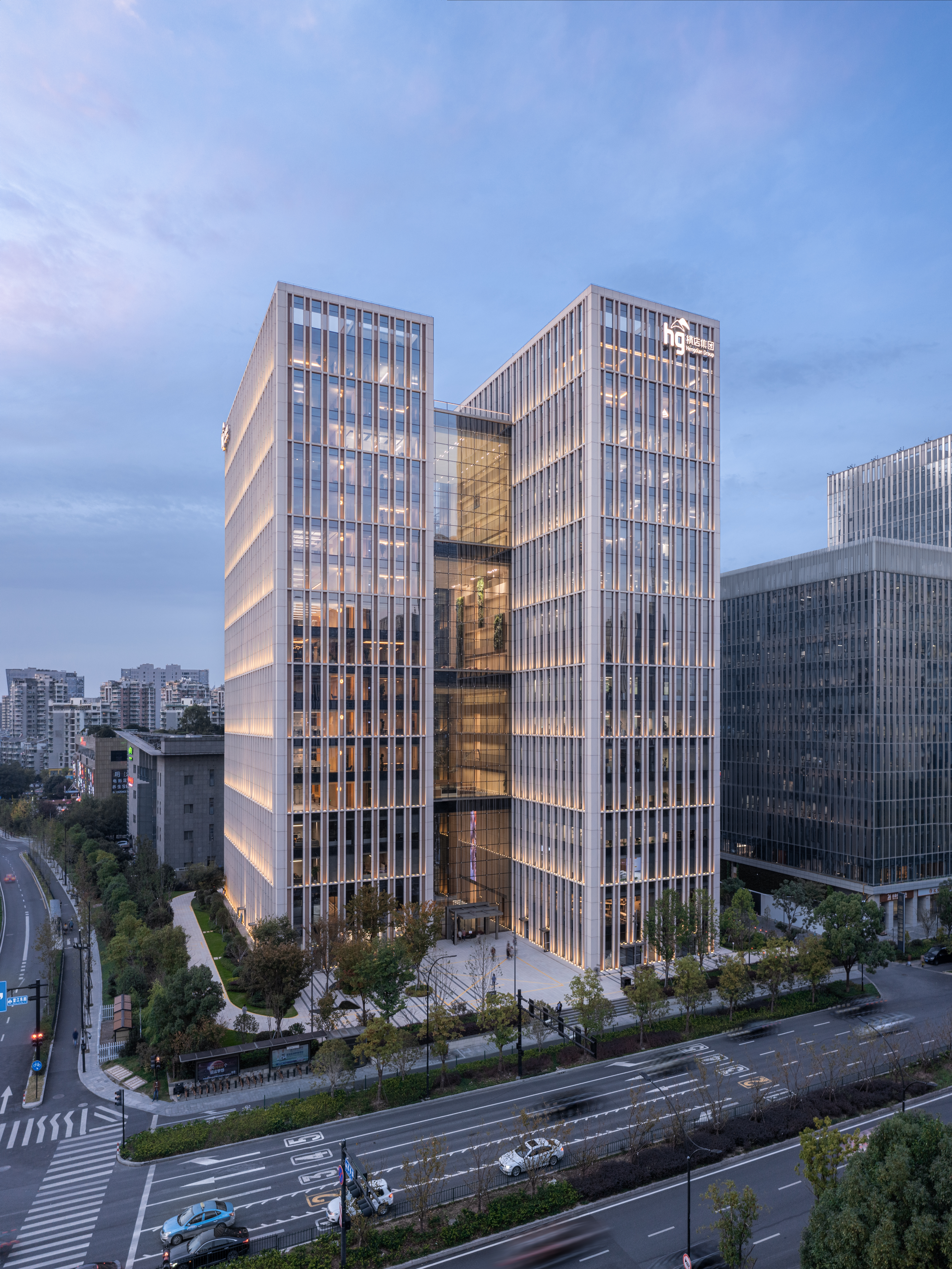
- Hengdian Center No.136 Fuchun Road, Shangcheng District, Hangzhou, Zhejiang, China.
- Native name: 横店集团控股有限公司
- Type: Private
- Industry: Film, electronics, pharmaceuticals
- Founded: 1975
- Founder: Xu Wenrong
- Headquarters: Hengdian, Zhejiang
- Area served: over 150 countries and regions
- Key people: Xu Wenrong (Founder); Xu Yongan (Chairman & President)
- Revenue: ▲CNY94 billion (2024)
- Total assets: CNY96.23 billion (2022)
- Number of employees: over 50,000 (2017)
- Subsidiaries: Apeloa Pharmaceutical; DMEGC Magnetics; Hengdian Entertainment; Hengdian World Studios; Innuovo Technology; Nanhua Futures; TOSPO Lighting
- Website: www.hengdian.com

Hengdian Group (Chinese: 横店集团), abbreviated as HG, is a Chinese private conglomerate founded by Xu Wenrong in 1975 in Hengdian, Zhejiang. It focuses on the fields of electrical and electronics, pharmaceuticals and chemicals, film and entertainment, and modern services. Since 1996, Hengdian Group has operated Hengdian World Studios, one of the largest film studios in the world. As the heart of China's growing film industry, Hengdian World Studios now spans 8,000 acres—a space that's 27 times bigger than Paramount and Universal studios combined.

== History ==
In 1975, Xu Wenrong set up Hengdian Reeling Silk Factory, which was the predecessor of Hengdian Group. In the 1990s, it expanded into high–tech sectors such as hard magnets, soft magnets, and pharmaceutical manufacturing.

In 1989, Hengdian group founded Apeloa Pharmaceutical, which was listed on the Shenzhen Stock Exchange in 1997, covers active pharmaceutical ingredients and intermediates, pesticides, medical devices, and medical services.

In 2004, Hengdian Group, Warner Bros. and China Film Group Corporation established a joint venture called Warner China Film HG. In 2008, it established the Zhejiang Hengdian Film Production Company.

Hengdian Group also expanded into the lighting field in late 1990s, covering light–emitting diode fixtures, lighting sources, smart lighting, and automotive lighting.

In 2017, Tospo Lighting Co., Ltd., a subsidiary of Hengdian Group, completed an IPO on the Shanghai Stock Exchange.

In August 2019, Nanhua Futures, a subsidiary of Hengdian Group, was listed on the Shanghai Stock Exchange.

In December 2021, Hengdian DMEGC, a public subsidiary of Hengdian Group, planned to form a joint venture with Japan's Foster Electric Co. in Vietnam for the manufacturing of ferrite magnets.

In November 2022, DMEGC signed an investment deal with Yibin, Sichuan to construct a 20 GW TOPCon cell factory in three phases for CNY 10bn ($1.41bn).

In March 2022, Apeloa Pharmaceutical Co., a public subsidiary of Hengdian Group, have signed on with UN–backed public health organization Medicines Patent Pool (MPP) to manufacture the generic version of Pfizer's oral COVID-19 treatment, nirmatrelvir.

In July 2022, Hengdian Entertainment, one of the listed companies of Hengdian group, offered RMB 3 billion ($446 million) to acquire Shanghai Xingyi Cinema Managements.

== Business areas ==
=== Electrical and Electronic ===
- DMEGC Magnetics
- Tospo Lighting

=== Pharmaceutical and Healthcare ===
- Apeloa Pharmaceutical

Apeloa Pharmaceutical, founded in 1989, is a healthcare company that manufactures and markets raw material medicines and preparations, including antitumour, antivirus, anti-infectious, cardiovascular, and other medicines. It specialises in API, CDMO and Finished Dosage Form (FDF). The company is a subsidiary of Hengdian Group and is listed on the main board of the Shenzhen Stock Exchange (SZSE: 000739).

=== Film and Entertainment ===
- Hengdian Entertainment
- Hengdian World Studios

Hengdian World Studios is a film studio located in Hengdian, a Chinese town in Zhejiang Province, and is one of the largest film studios in the world. Its sets span over 8500 acres — more than Paramount Studios and Universal Studios put together — and have been used to film over a thousand Chinese TV shows and films, including Hero (2002 film) and Crouching Tiger, Hidden Dragon.

=== Modern Services ===
- Nanhua Futures

Nanhua, founded in 1996, is Hengdian Group's financial futures subsidiary. The company is principally engaged in futures brokerage, futures investment consulting, asset management, and securities investment fund agency businesses. Its futures brokerage business includes commodity futures and financial futures. Its asset management business includes single customer asset management and specific multi-client asset management. Nanhua also conducts OTC derivatives business, basis trading, and market–making operations through its wholly owned subsidiary Zhejiang Nanhua Capital Management Co., Ltd. and its subsidiaries. It was listed on the Shanghai Stock Exchange (SSE: 603093) in 2019 and was the first futures company in China to so do.
