= The Opium War (film) =

- Japanese film poster

Chinese name
- Traditional Chinese: 鴉片戰爭
- Simplified Chinese: 鸦片战争
- Literal meaning: opium war
Transcriptions
Standard Mandarin
- Hanyu Pinyin: Yāpiàn Zhànzhēng
- Directed by: Xie Jin
- Written by: Zhu Sujin; Ni Zhen; Zong Fuxian; Mai Tianshu
- Produced by: Chen Zhigu
- Starring: Bao Guo'an; Lin Liankun; Sihung Lung; Bob Peck; Simon Williams; Shao Hsin; Su Min
- Cinematography: Hou Yong; Shang Yong
- Edited by: David Wu; Qian Lili; Zhang Longgen
- Music by: Jin Fuzai; Huang Hanqi
- Production companies: Emei Film Studio; Xie Jin / Heng Tong Film & TV Co.
- Distributed by: Golden Harvest; Mandarin Films (International) Co. Ltd.
- Release dates: 9 June 1997 (China); 13 June 1997 (Hong Kong)
- Running time: 153 minutes
- Country: China
- Languages: Mandarin; English

The Opium War (鸦片战争) is a 1997 Chinese historical epic film directed by Xie Jin. The winner of the 1997 Golden Rooster and 1998 Hundred Flowers Awards for Best Picture, the film was screened in several international film festivals, notably Cannes and Montreal. The film tells the story of the First Opium War of 1839–1842, which was fought between the Qing Empire of China and the British Empire, from the perspectives of key figures such as the Chinese viceroy Lin Zexu and the British naval diplomat Charles Elliot.

Unlike other films of the same era, The Opium War was endorsed by the government as culturally and historically significant. According to most critics, the film is factually correct in its essentials.

With a budget of $15 million (USD), The Opium War, was the most expensive film produced in China at the time of its release.

== Plot ==
Qing Dynasty official Lin Zexu believes opium is a national scourge and efforts must be made to eradicate it. The British Empire makes a great deal of money shipping it to China and selling it to Chinese drug addicts. When Lin Zexu arrives in Guangdong in 1838, he immediately bans its use and seizes large quantities from the British drug traffickers. News of this reaches Queen Victoria, who orders military action to enforce the "free trade" of opium. The British demand monetary compensation for the seized opium, five free trade ports in China, and the island of Hong Kong as their sovereign territory. The Chinese refuse all these demands.

The British declare war. To lower tensions, the imperial court fires Lin Zexu and replaces him with Qishan, who is more lax with opium smuggling. Qishan tries to reason with the British, offering them a large amount of money. The British counter with a demand for twice Qishan's offer. Qishan then tries to stall an attack by treating the British to a lavish feast and the province's best singers and dancers. These efforts fail to appease the British.

In the climax of the film, Guan Tianpei leads his troops in defense of Humen Fort while the British Army launch a fierce fusillade of cannon fire from their warships. Unfortunately, the cannons in the Chinese fort are not large enough to reach the British warships; all the officers and soldiers defending the fort are killed in battle.

At the end of the film, Lin Zexu is sent to Xinjiang, the British and the Qing government sign the Treaty of Nanking, and Hong Kong becomes a British colony.

== Cast ==
- Bao Guo'an as Lin Zexu
- Lin Liankun as Qishan
- Sihung Lung as He Jingrong
- Shao Hsin as He Shanzi
- Bob Peck as Denton (based on Lancelot Dent)
- Simon Williams as Charles Elliot
- Su Min as the Daoguang Emperor
- Jiang Hua as Guan Tianpei
- Li Shilong as Han Zhaoqing
- Li Weixin as Deng Tingzhen
- Gao Yuan as Rong'er
- Emma Griffiths as Mary Denton
- Philip Jackson as Captain White
- Garrick Hagon as Sidon Laughton
- Robert Freeman as Hill
- Denis Lill as Lord Eversley
- Corin Redgrave as Lord Melbourne
- Debra Beaumont as Queen Victoria
- Benjamin Whitrow as Lord Palmerston
- Oliver Cotton as Gordon Bremer
- Zhou Chuanyi as Yiliang
- Ko Hsiang-ting as Yishan
- Liu Zhongyuan as Lü Zifang
- Shi Yang as Lin Sheng
- Gu Lan as senior minister
- Kong Xianzhu as He Rengui
- Chang Xueren as San
- Li Shaoxiong as Yao Huaixiang
- Yang Heping as military officer
- Yang Zhaoquan as blind musician
- Wang Fen as Qiuping
- Liang Yang as Baihe
- He Qingqing as Lanrui
- Zhang Wanwen as brothel owner
- James Innes-Smith as Prince Albert
- Edward Petherbridge as British Member of Parliament
- Dominic Jephcott as British Member of Parliament
- Tony Rushforth as British Member of Parliament
- Jamie Wilson (uncredited) as Paul Artuard
- Nigel Davenport (uncredited)

== Production ==
The production began filming in May 1996. It was shot at the Hengdian World Studios in Zhejiang province, a common filming site for historical films which has been dubbed "Chinawood." In order to recreate the streets of 19th-century Guangzhou, nearly 120 construction teams from surrounding villages were assembled. In contrast, nearly all post-production took place in Japan. Variety reported that the official production costs were reportedly around $9.6 million, with estimates being as high as $15 million.

== Reception ==
Derek Elley, in a review for Variety, wrote that despite its "unashamedly political message," The Opium War was nevertheless "comparatively even-handed," while the film itself had excellent production values. The Guardian recognised that the film, despite its official backing, "was relatively nuanced," and praised the performance of Bob Peck as the corrupt opium trader Denton.

The film's domestic release was also positive, with The Opium War eventually winning the Golden Rooster for Best Film.
