= Hengdian World Studios =

Large film studio in Zhejiang, China

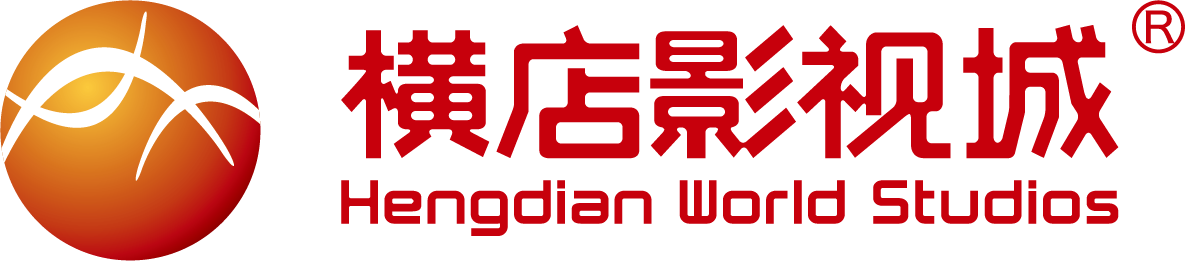
- Interactive map of Hengdian World Studios
- Location: Dongyang, Zhejiang, China
- Coordinates: 29.179068°N 120.298083°E
- Status: Operating
- Opened: 1996
- Owner: Hengdian Group
- Theme: Film Studios and Theme Parks
- Website: www.hengdianworld.com/en/

Hengdian World Studios
- Simplified Chinese: 横店影视城
- Traditional Chinese: 橫店影視城
Transcriptions
Standard Mandarin
- Hanyu Pinyin: Héngdiàn Yǐngshì Chéng

Hengdian World Studios (Chinese: 横店影视城; pinyin: Héngdiàn Yǐngshìchéng) is a Chinese film studio located in the town of Hengdian, Dongyang, a county-level city in eastern Jinhua, Zhejiang province. It is one of the largest outdoor film studios in the world, and is operated by the privately owned Hengdian Group founded by Xu Wenrong, who developed acres of farmland in central Zhejiang into a large filmmaking backlot in the mid-1990s. The studio is around 331 hectares (820 acres) in total area with a gross leasable area of 495,995 m^{2} (122.6 acres), and has been ongoing ever since with the completed addition of the replica of the Old Summer Palace called the Hengdian Yuanmingyuan. A film about extras working at the studio, I Am Somebody, was released in China in 2015.

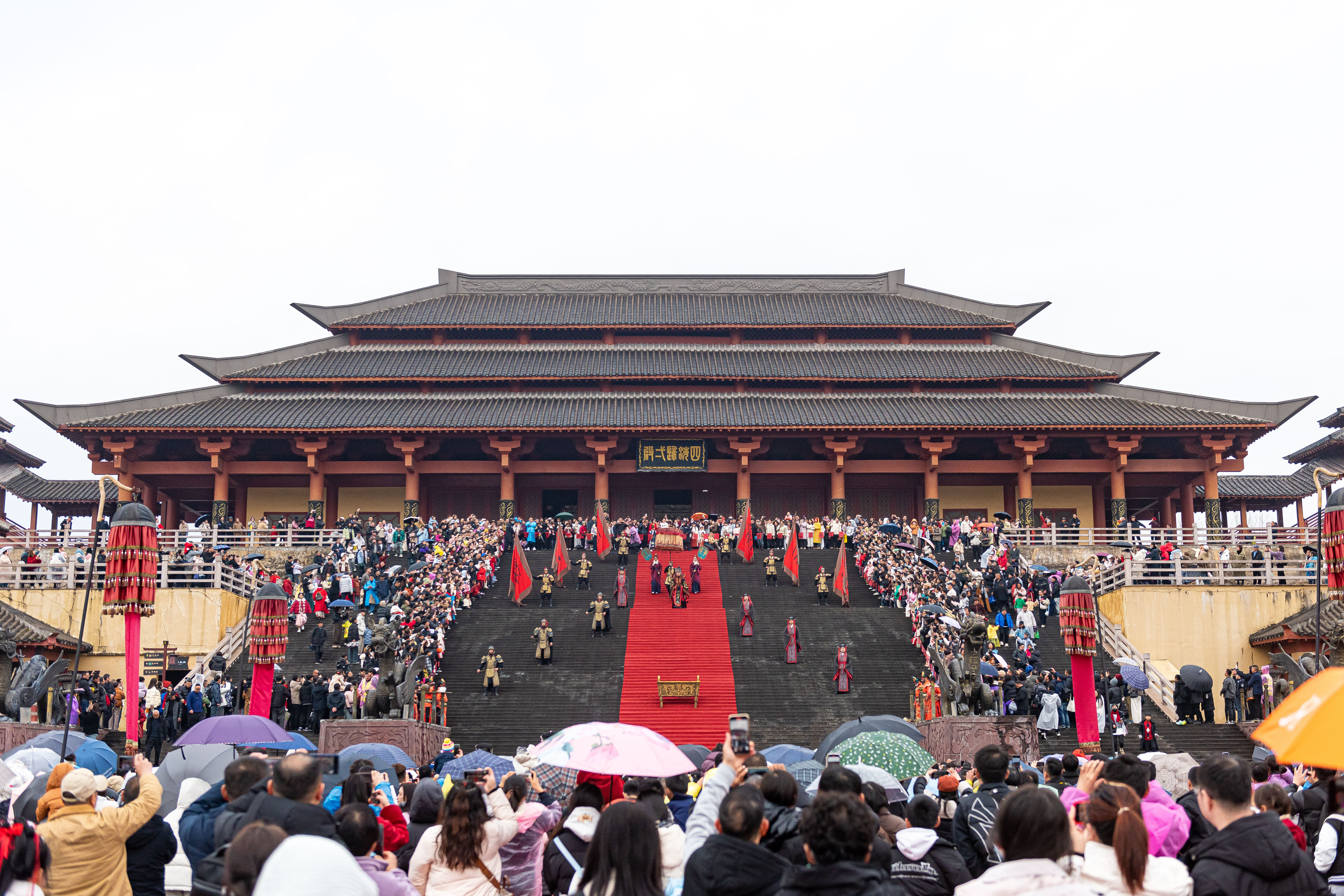
A real-sized replica of Qin Imperial Palace at Hengdian World Studios

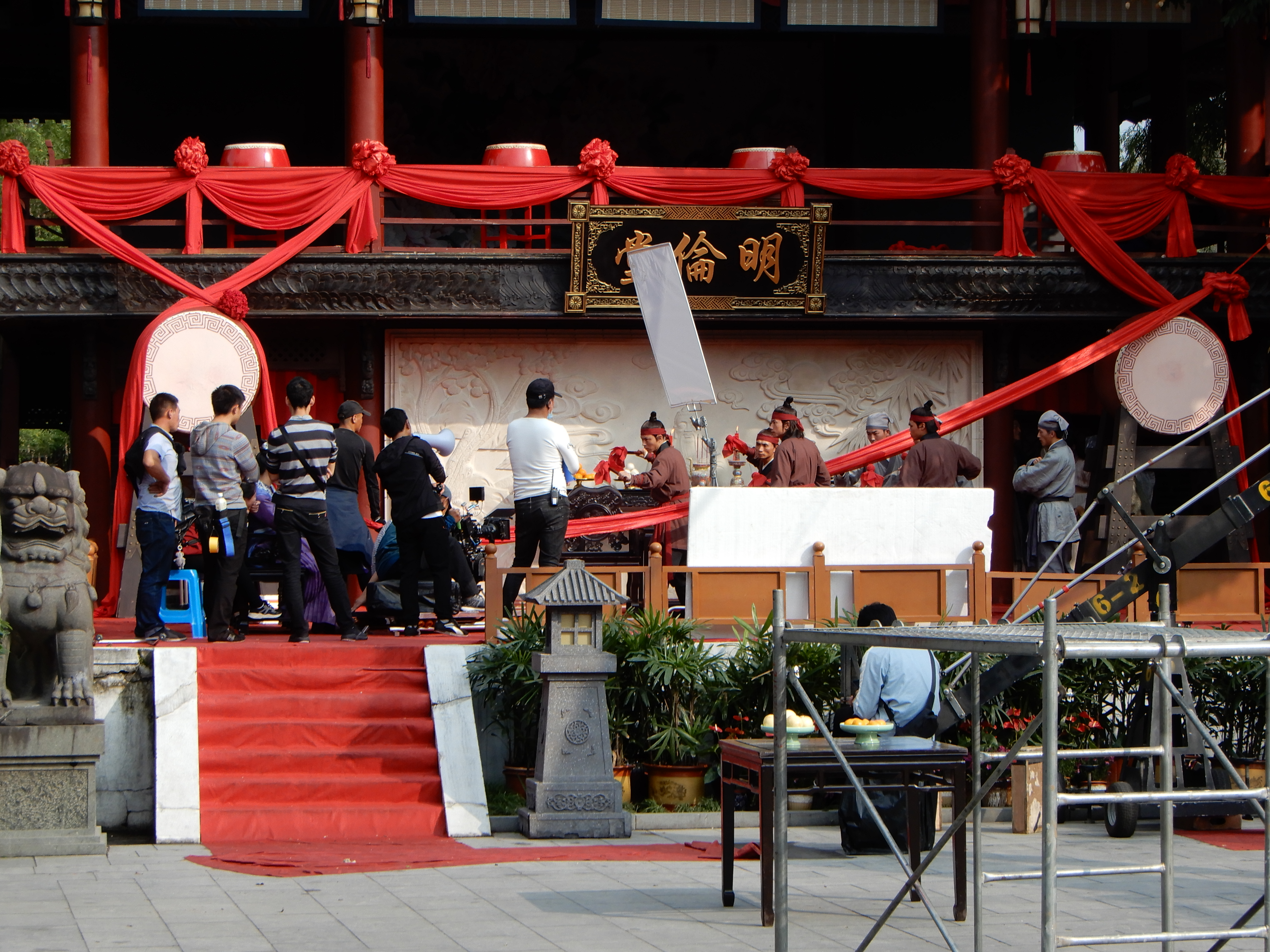
A scene of a drama filming at Hengdian World Studios

== Studio ==
The studio's sets are free for film crews; the studio makes returns on the hotels, restaurants, equipment and costumes. The studio consists of 30 outdoor shooting bases and 130 indoor studio sets, with a total area of up to 330 ha. and building areas of 495,995 square meters. In addition to its huge scale, the studio also has several records which includes:

1. Largest Indoor Buddha Figure in China.
2. Largest Scale Indoor Studio.
3. Highest number of Films and Teleplay Shoots as of 2005.

One of the studio's largest buildings is the Imperial Palace Building built in the Early Chinese Dynasty style in the Qin and Han periods. That area is still frequently used to shoot movies based on these eras. The director Zhang Yimou used this building as the backdrop for the Emperor Qin's palace for his 2002 movie Hero. A Hong Kong TVB drama serial titled A Step into the Past which tells the story of the First Qin Emperor also used the same building as the main backdrop. The studio was also used to film The Forbidden Kingdom, the first on-screen collaboration between actors Jackie Chan and Jet Li. In addition, it was also used for the filming of the popular Korean drama serial Empress Ki. More than 1,200 movies and TV shows have been shot there, including Ang Lee's Oscar-winning Crouching Tiger, Hidden Dragon; the Mummy: Tomb of the Dragon Emperor, which is Hollywood co-produced using sets in the Studio; live-action Mulan (2020 film) released on Disney+ on September 4, 2020 in the US.

== History ==
In 1996, Guangzhou Street Scenic Area, the first film and television shooting base, was built to shoot the film Opium War by director Xie Jin.
In 1997, the King of Qin Palace scenic spot was constructed.
In 2000, all its scenes were declared free of rent.
In 2004, Hengdian Film and Television Industry Experimental Zone was established as China's number one national film and television industry experimental zone.
In 2010, Hengdian World Studios was listed as a national AAAAA level Scenic Spot.

== Visitor attendance ==
In additional to being a film studio, Hengdian World Studios has also become a tourist attraction, with many of its large sets opening to visitors.

2011	2012	2013	2014	2015	2016	2017	2018	2019
10.9 million	11.77 million	12 million	13.8 million	15.18 million	15.77 million	16 million	19 million	20 million

== Film and television ==
It has been reported that around 70 percent of period Chinese television shows and films are being shot at Hengdian World Studios every year.

=== Film ===
- Confucius
- Detective Dee and the Mystery of the Phantom Flame
- DOA: Dead or Alive
- I Am Somebody
- Iron Road
- The Man with the Iron Fists
- The Opium War
- Reign of Assassins
- Snow Flower and the Secret Fan
- The Warriors Gate

=== TV series ===
- Beauty's Rival in Palace
- Carol of Zhenguan
- The Confidant
- Founding Emperor of Ming Dynasty
- The Heaven Sword and Dragon Saber
- Legend of Nine Tails Fox
- Madam White Snake
- Palace
- The Patriotic Knights
- A Step into the Past
- Story of Yanxi Palace
- Zheng He Xia Xiyang
- The Untamed
- No Return (2024 TV series)
- Pursuit of Jade

== Select attractions ==
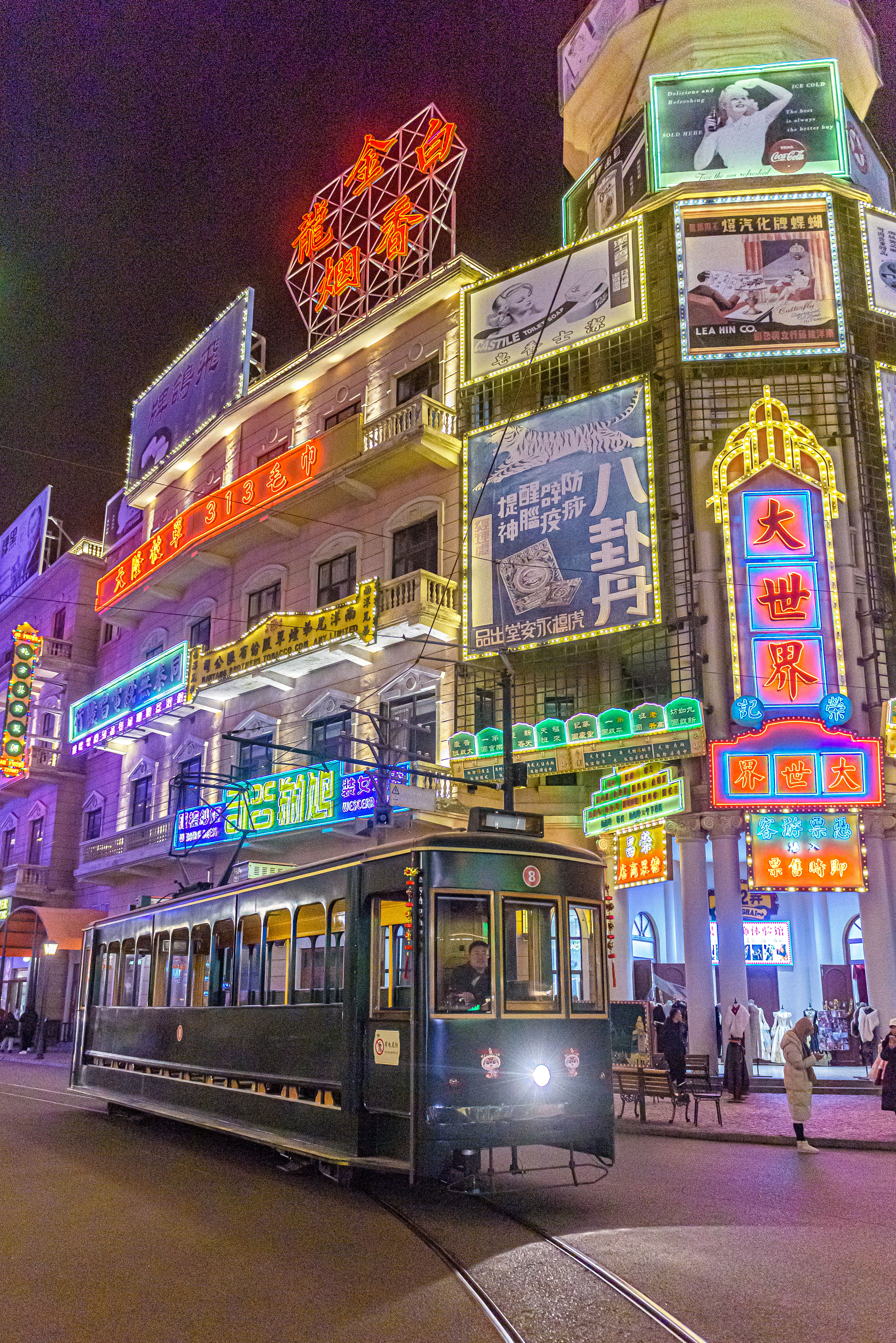
A replica of Shanghai Great World in the Legend of Bund area at Hengdian World Studios

Attraction	Type
Old Guangzhou Street and Old Hong Kong Street	Scenic spot Shooting base Live show/performance
The Palace of Emperor Qin	Scenic spot Shooting base Live show/performance
Palace of Ming and Qing Dynasties	Scenic spot Shooting base Live show/performance
Qing Ming Shang He Tu	Scenic spot Shooting base Live show/performance
Legend of Bund	Scenic spot Shooting base Live show/performance
New Yuanmingyuan	Scenic spot Shooting base Live show/performance
Dream Valley	Scenic spot Amusement park
