= Yangqu County =

Yangqu 阳曲县
- County
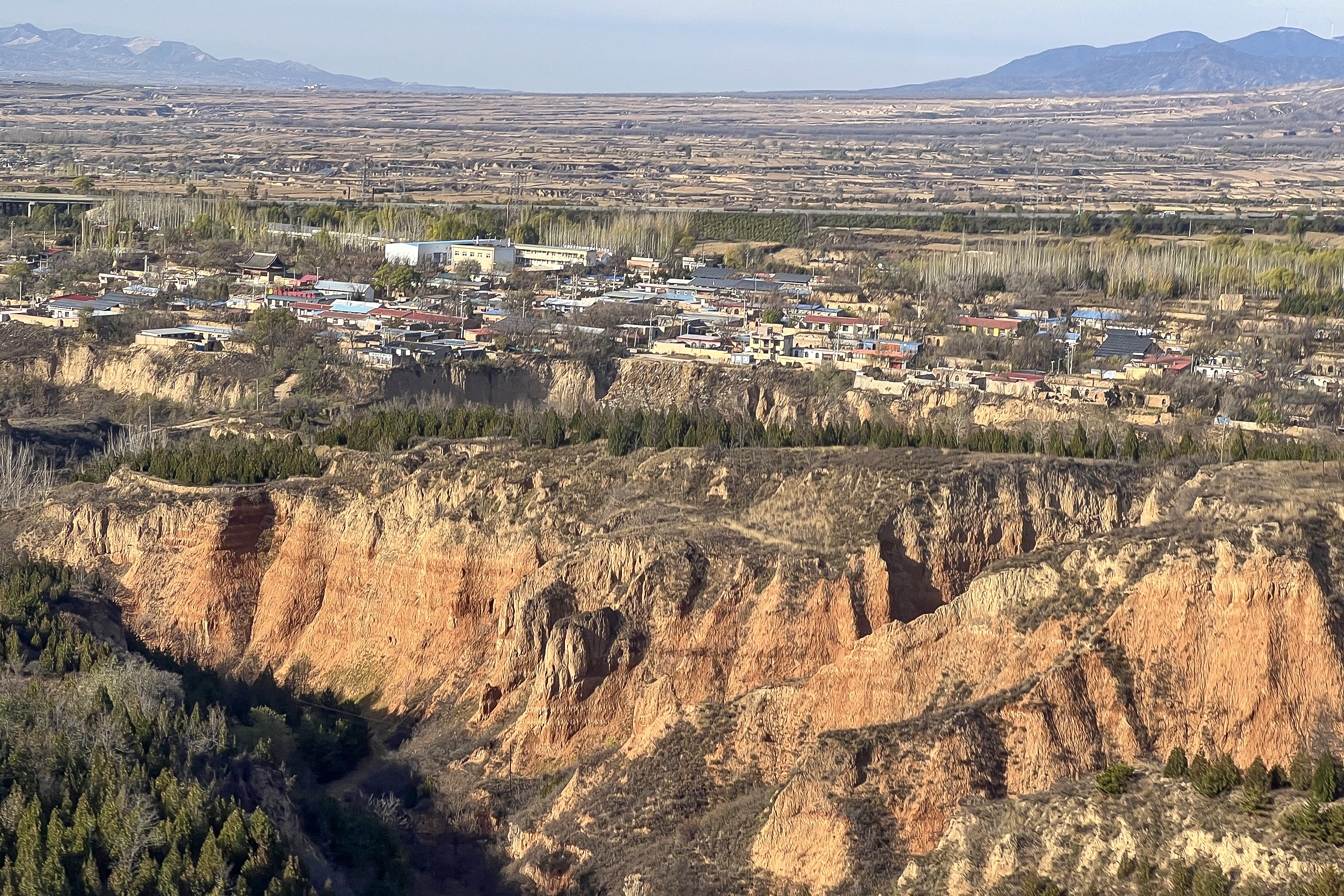
- Fanzhuang Village

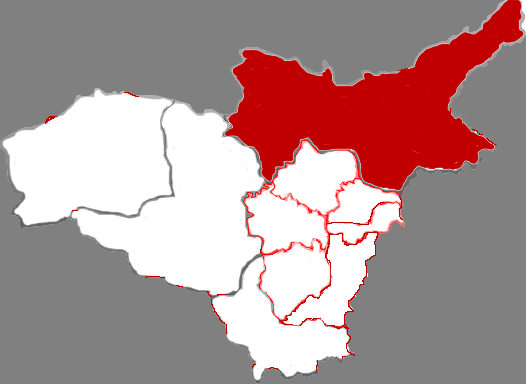
- Location in Taiyuan

- Location of the seat in Shanxi
- Coordinates: 38°03′32″N 112°40′22″E
- Country: People's Republic of China
- Province: Shanxi
- Prefecture-level city: Taiyuan

Population (2020)
  - Total: 128,483
- Time zone: UTC+8 (China Standard)
- Website: www.sxyangqu.gov.cn

Yangqu County (simplified Chinese: 阳曲县; traditional Chinese: 陽曲縣; pinyin: Yángqǔ Xiàn) is a county of Shanxi Province, North China, it is under the administration of the prefecture-level city of Taiyuan, the capital of the province, and is both its northernmost and easternmost county-level division.

== History ==
In 1920, Peter Torjesen, a Norwegian missionary, went to Hequ in Shanxi Province and established various social and community services as part of his ministry. In 1989 the Shanxi provincial government invited Torjesen's descendants, who had since emigrated to the United States, to return to Shanxi and resume this charitable work. In response, the Torjesen family and their friends established Shanxi Evergreen Services. (‘Evergreen’ is a reference to the Chinese name that Torjesen used, 叶永青.) The organisation has since grown steadily.

Work has included long-term training programmes for local health professionals in family medicine and maternal and child health. A ‘Samaritan Fund’ covers the costs of essential medical treatment for impoverished people in Yangqu County.

SES provides scholarships for children from poor families to remain in school, and has established a community centre that includes a library and computer equipment. Various activities for local children take place at the centre, which also oversees a mobile library service that lends reading materials to rural schools.

An Evergreen Agricultural Training and Demonstration Centre facilitates training in appropriate agricultural technologies, provides assistance in marketing produce, and helps farmers to form cooperatives and technical associations that improve productivity. New, low-cost biogas digester technology is now being tested, for incorporation into agricultural development projects.

Other ongoing projects include English language training for people with limited access to foreign teachers – such as health workers in urban hospitals, rural middle school teachers; assistance to Chinese and international businesses and organizations looking to bring foreign investment to Shanxi, and facilitation of foreign experts and cultural exchanges in military, publishing, academic, religious and economic sectors.

== Climate ==
Climate data for Yangqu, elevation 897 m (2,943 ft), (1991–2020 normals, extremes 1981–2010)
Month	Jan	Feb	Mar	Apr	May	Jun	Jul	Aug	Sep	Oct	Nov	Dec	Year
Record high °C (°F)	11.9 (53.4)	18.7 (65.7)	27.9 (82.2)	36.4 (97.5)	36.2 (97.2)	39.4 (102.9)	39.6 (103.3)	35.8 (96.4)	35.3 (95.5)	28.7 (83.7)	21.4 (70.5)	16.2 (61.2)	39.6 (103.3)
Mean daily maximum °C (°F)	1.6 (34.9)	5.8 (42.4)	12.3 (54.1)	19.9 (67.8)	25.5 (77.9)	29.1 (84.4)	30.0 (86.0)	28.1 (82.6)	23.6 (74.5)	17.5 (63.5)	9.4 (48.9)	2.7 (36.9)	17.1 (62.8)
Daily mean °C (°F)	−6.7 (19.9)	−2.4 (27.7)	4.2 (39.6)	11.8 (53.2)	17.9 (64.2)	21.9 (71.4)	23.6 (74.5)	21.8 (71.2)	16.4 (61.5)	9.6 (49.3)	1.6 (34.9)	−5.2 (22.6)	9.5 (49.2)
Mean daily minimum °C (°F)	−13.2 (8.2)	−9.0 (15.8)	−2.8 (27.0)	4.1 (39.4)	10.0 (50.0)	14.9 (58.8)	18.1 (64.6)	16.6 (61.9)	10.7 (51.3)	3.4 (38.1)	−4.2 (24.4)	−11.1 (12.0)	3.1 (37.6)
Record low °C (°F)	−24.4 (−11.9)	−21.6 (−6.9)	−18.3 (−0.9)	−7.0 (19.4)	−0.6 (30.9)	3.3 (37.9)	10.2 (50.4)	7.3 (45.1)	−1.0 (30.2)	−8.1 (17.4)	−20.7 (−5.3)	−27.0 (−16.6)	−27.0 (−16.6)
Average precipitation mm (inches)	2.2 (0.09)	4.5 (0.18)	8.8 (0.35)	22.5 (0.89)	32.0 (1.26)	54.3 (2.14)	105.3 (4.15)	104.1 (4.10)	57.4 (2.26)	28.9 (1.14)	11.9 (0.47)	1.9 (0.07)	433.8 (17.1)
Average precipitation days (≥ 0.1 mm)	1.8	2.6	3.3	5.4	6.8	9.9	12.0	11.4	8.3	5.8	3.4	1.7	72.4
Average snowy days	2.5	3.1	2.4	0.9	0	0	0	0	0	0.1	2.2	2.4	13.6
Average relative humidity (%)	54	50	46	45	47	55	68	72	71	65	61	56	58
Mean monthly sunshine hours	175.0	177.9	215.9	237.5	262.3	228.2	210.6	210.3	194.5	200.0	175.2	177.5	2,464.9
Percentage possible sunshine	57	58	58	60	59	52	47	50	53	58	59	60	56
Source: China Meteorological Administration
