= Qian Yanqiu =

Chinese film director (born 1968)

- Born: September 30, 1968 (age 57); Beijing, China
- Education: Beijing Film Academy
- Occupations: Director, screenwriter, actor
- Notable work: Amazing Detective Di Renjie
- Spouse: Liu Shuang

Qian Yanqiu (Chinese: 钱雁秋) is a Chinese film director, screenwriter, and actor.

He is a graduate of Beijing Film Academy and is most known as the creator and director of the Amazing Detective Di Renjie series.

== Career ==
In 2003, Qian created the Amazing Detective Di Renjie series, starring Liang Guanhua and fellow Beijing Film Academy graduate Zhang Zijian. The series would later have three sequels. Qian also created the Yan Shuangying series in 2009, starring Zhang as the protagonist and Liang as recurring antagonists.

=== Copyright dispute ===
During filming of Mad Detective Di Renjie (神断狄仁杰), Qian’s script was not used, leading to a dispute on who owned the copyright. Producer Zhang Wenling stated that when the investors hired Qian as director and screenwriter, they signed an agreement stipulating that he only had the right to be credited, not the copyright to the script. However, Qian stated that he had already registered the copyrights of all three of his Detective Di Renjie scripts. This ultimately led to the production company creating a separate fourth entry (神探狄仁杰之情花金人案), directed by Tan Youye and produced by Zhang Wenling, with many cast members being replaced.

== Filmography ==
Year	English title	Chinese title	Director	Writer	Role
1989		青春无季	No	No	Hou Yong
1991		日光港的故事	No	No	Sun Xiaohu
1992		青春不会等待	No	No	Zong Haisheng
1995		居委会的故事	Yes	No	
1996		毕业生	No	Yes	
1998	True Love	挚爱	Yes	Yes	
1998		洪峰抢险	No	Yes	
1999		封锯之后	No	Yes	
1999	Journey to the West Afterstory	西游记后传	No	Yes	
2000		口红	No	Yes	
2000	Hero	英雄	Yes	Yes	Zhao Yiping
2001		谁可相依	No	Yes	
2001		隋唐演义	No	Yes	
2002	Life and Death Juncture	生死极限	Yes	Yes	
2003		狸猫换太子传奇	Yes	Yes	
2004	Amazing Detective Di Renjie	神探狄仁杰	Yes	Yes	Xu Shide
2005	Amazing Detective Di Renjie 2	神探狄仁杰2	Yes	Yes	
2008	Amazing Detective Di Renjie 3	神探狄仁杰3	Yes	Yes	Yuan Qi
2009	The Falcon 1949	猎鹰1949	Yes	Yes	Huo Jie
2010	Mad Detective Di Renjie	神断狄仁杰	Yes	Yes	Qi Ge
2011	Flying Tiger Condor	飞虎神鹰	Yes	Yes	Chen Gongpeng
2012	Island Falcon	孤岛飞鹰	Yes	Yes	
2013	Plain Beacon	平原烽火	Yes	Yes	
2014	Desert Sharpshooter	大漠枪神	Yes	Yes	Bu Ying; Laodaobazi
2015	Detective Bao Zheng	神探包青天	Yes	Yes	Zhao Jue
2015	Dare Stone Male Tiandong	石敢当之雄峙天东	Yes	Yes	Erlangshen
2015	Flying Tigers	飞虎队	Yes	No	
2017	Jinmen Falcon	津门飞鹰	Yes	Yes	Yuan Wencai
2017		苏东坡断案	Yes	No	
2020		秋官課院之狄仁傑浮世傳奇	Yes	Yes	Fanghe Zhenren
2023		虎胆神鹰	Yes	No	Lu Changfeng
