= Mad Detective Di Renjie =

- DVD cover art
- Also known as: Shen Duan Di Renjie; Shen Tan Di Renjie 4

Chinese name
- Traditional Chinese: 神斷狄仁傑 / 神探狄仁傑4
- Simplified Chinese: 神断狄仁杰 / 神探狄仁杰4
Transcriptions
Standard Mandarin
- Hanyu Pinyin: Shén Duàn Dí Rénjié / Shén Tàn Dí Rénjié Sì
- Genre: Detective fiction Historical drama Gong'an fiction crime fiction
- Written by: Qian Yanqiu
- Directed by: Qian Yanqiu
- Presented by: Zhan Jun
- Starring: Liang Guanhua; Zhang Zijian; Lü Zhong
- Opening theme: Chang Ge Yi Qu (长歌一曲) performed by Tengger
- Country of origin: China
- Original language: Mandarin
- No. of episodes: 44

Production
- Producer: Zhang Hongzhen
- Production location: China
- Running time: 45 minutes per episode
- Production companies: Beijing Aikesaiwen Film & TV Production; Dongyang Kingrain Films & TV Culture

Original release
- Network: CCTV-8

Related
- Amazing Detective Di Renjie 3 (2008)

Mad Detective Di Renjie, also known as Amazing Detective Di Renjie 4, is the fourth installment in a four-season Chinese television series based on gong'an detective stories related to Di Renjie, a Tang dynasty magistrate and statesman. Written and directed by Qian Yanqiu, the series starred Liang Guanhua as the titular protagonist, and was first broadcast on CCTV-8 in 2010, two years after the third season.

== Plot ==
The plot is divided into two parts as follows:

1. Jin Yin Qi An (金银奇案)
2. Sha Ren Xian Jing (杀人陷阱)

== Cast ==
- Liang Guanhua as Di Renjie
- Zhang Zijian as Li Yuanfang
- Lü Zhong as Wu Zetian
- Yuan Ran as Wu Yuanmin (Princess Yingyang)
- Qu Shanshan as Di Ruyan
- Xu Qian as Zeng Tai
- Fu Jun as Sha'er Khan
- Su Hao as Di Fu
- Liang Kai as Zhang Huan
- Yan Yansheng as Wang Xiaojie
- Zheng Nan as Chunhong
- Li Junqi as Ilterish Qaghan
- Li Zhuolin as Li Lang
- Liu Lei as Zhong Wuniang
- Suzuki Miki as Youze Lihui
- Dai Yunxia as Fenghuang
- Zheng Cheng as Yizhigumalü
- Yang Zengyuan as Wulezhi / Jiwangjue Khan
- Li Xi'er as Consort Nalu
- Li Shilong as Wu Youde
- Liu Wendi as Prince Qiongta
- Wang Xinsheng as He Lu
