= Amazing Detective Di Renjie 3 =

- DVD cover art
- Also known as: Shen Tan Di Renjie 3
- Traditional Chinese: 神探狄仁傑3
- Simplified Chinese: 神探狄仁杰3
- Hanyu Pinyin: Shén Tàn Dí Rénjié Sān
- Genre: detective fiction, historical drama, gong'an fiction, crime fiction
- Written by: Qian Yanqiu
- Directed by: Qian Yanqiu; Zhang Wenling
- Presented by: Zhu Tong; Zhang Huilin
- Starring: Liang Guanhua; Zhang Zijian; Lü Zhong
- Opening theme: Chang Ge Yi Qu (长歌一曲) performed by Tengger
- Country of origin: China
- Original language: Mandarin
- No. of episodes: 48

Production
- Executive producers: Fu Si; Zhang Xiaojie; Huang Haitao
- Producers: Zhang Wenling; Li Changjiang; Cui Yu; He Guifeng
- Production location: China
- Cinematography: Zhang Yuan; Fan Hao; Liu Shuangqing
- Editor: Du Li
- Running time: 45 minutes per episode

Original release
- Network: CCTV-8
- Release: 15 March 2008

Amazing Detective Di Renjie 3, also known as Shen Tan Di Renjie 3, is the third installment in a four-season Chinese television series based on gong'an detective stories related to Di Renjie, a Tang dynasty magistrate and statesman. Written by Qian Yanqiu and directed by Qian and Zhang Wenling, the series starred Liang Guanhua as the titular protagonist, and was first broadcast on CCTV-8 on 15 March 2008, two years after the second season. It was followed by Mad Detective Di Renjie in 2010.

== Plot ==
The plot is divided into two parts as follows:

1. Hei Yi She (黑衣社), covering episodes 1 to 18.
2. Cao Qu Mei Ying (漕渠魅影), covering episodes 19 to 48.

== Cast ==
- Liang Guanhua as Di Renjie
- Zhang Zijian as Li Yuanfang
- Lü Zhong as Wu Zetian
- Xu Qian as Zeng Tai
- Dong Xuan as Yungu / Xiaoqing
- Yuan Ran as Xiaotao
- Guan Yue as Wei'er
- Song Chuyan as Wang Qiang
- Yang Zengyuan as Fang Zhe
- Zhao Chao as Liao Wenqing
- Fu Jun as Wang Kai
- Shi Baoshan as Official Li
- Su Zixi as Xiaojuan
- Liu Suhui as Laobao
- Zhao Liang as Fengyang
- Xu Ying as Jiawa
- Wu Siman as Zhala
- Gong Haibin as Qi Hu
- Wang Lei as Pan Yue
- Li Zhuolin as Shen Tao
- He Zhengheng as Xiao Bao
- Liu Jia as Yan'er
- Liu Xuejiao as Meixiang
- Zhang Shuping as Lu Jiying
- Zhao Junkai as He Wuqi
- Guo Qiming as Wen Qing
- Qu Hongni as Ning Wushuang
- Han Zhenhua as Ge Tianba
- Wang Xinsheng as Cui Liang
