= CCTV-8 =

China Central Television drama channel

CCTV-8 电视剧
- Country: China

Programming
- Picture format: 1080i HDTV (downscaled to 576i for the SD feed)

Ownership
- Owner: China Central Television

History
- Launched: 1 January 1996
- Former names: China Central Television Literature and Art Channel(1996–1999)

Links
- Website: CCTV-8

Availability

Terrestrial
- Digital TV (DTMB): Digital channel number varies by area

Streaming media
- CCTV program website: CCTV-8 (some programs may screened on due to copyright restriction)

CCTV-8 is the television drama channel of the CCTV (China Central Television) in the People's Republic of China. The channel specializes in dramas.

The channel also airs international drama series. On 19 December 2005, it started airing Desperate Housewives. Negotiations with Disney took place in the summer and was expected to air in September, but got delayed due to unknown reasons. It aired as part of Everyday Jiayi, a programming block produced by Zone Vision. In August 2010, it acquired TV Globo's Mulher, the first Brazilian series seen in mainland China in approximately 25 years, since Escrava Isaura. Later that year, it acquired A Casa das Sete Mulheres.
