= Robert van Gulik bibliography =

This is the complete list of works by Dutch historical mystery novelist Robert van Gulik.

== Bibliography ==
=== Fiction ===
- The Given Day, 1964, Creative Arts Books (1986), Berkeley, California, ISBN 9780960998616

==== Judge Dee mysteries ====
===== in order written and published =====
- Celebrated Cases of Judge Dee, translation of the Chinese Dee Goong An (1941–1948)
- The Chinese Maze Murders (written 1950, published in Japanese in 1951, published in English in 1956)
- The Chinese Bell Murders (written 1953–1956, published 1958)
- New Year's Eve in Lan-Fang [1958; separately published short story in 200 copies as a New Year's gift from van Gulik]
- The Chinese Gold Murders (written 1956, published 1959)
- The Chinese Lake Murders (written 1953–1956, published 1960)
- The Chinese Nail Murders (written 1958, published 1961)
- The Haunted Monastery (written 1958–1959, published 1961)
- The Red Pavilion (written 1958–1959, published 1961)
- The Lacquer Screen (written 1958–1959, published 1962)
- The Emperor's Pearl (1963)
- The Monkey and the Tiger, two short novels (1965), collects De Nacht van de Tijger (1963), written in Dutch, short story, english "The Night of the Tiger", and Vier vingers (1964), written in Dutch as Boekenweekgeschenk (= present for the Week of the Book); short story, english "The Morning of the Monkey"
- The Willow Pattern (1965)
- Murder in Canton (1966)
- The Phantom of the Temple (1966)
- Judge Dee at Work, short stories (1967)
- Necklace and Calabash (1967)
- Poets and Murder (1968); also published in the U.S. in 1973 as Fox-magic Murders

===== in internal order =====
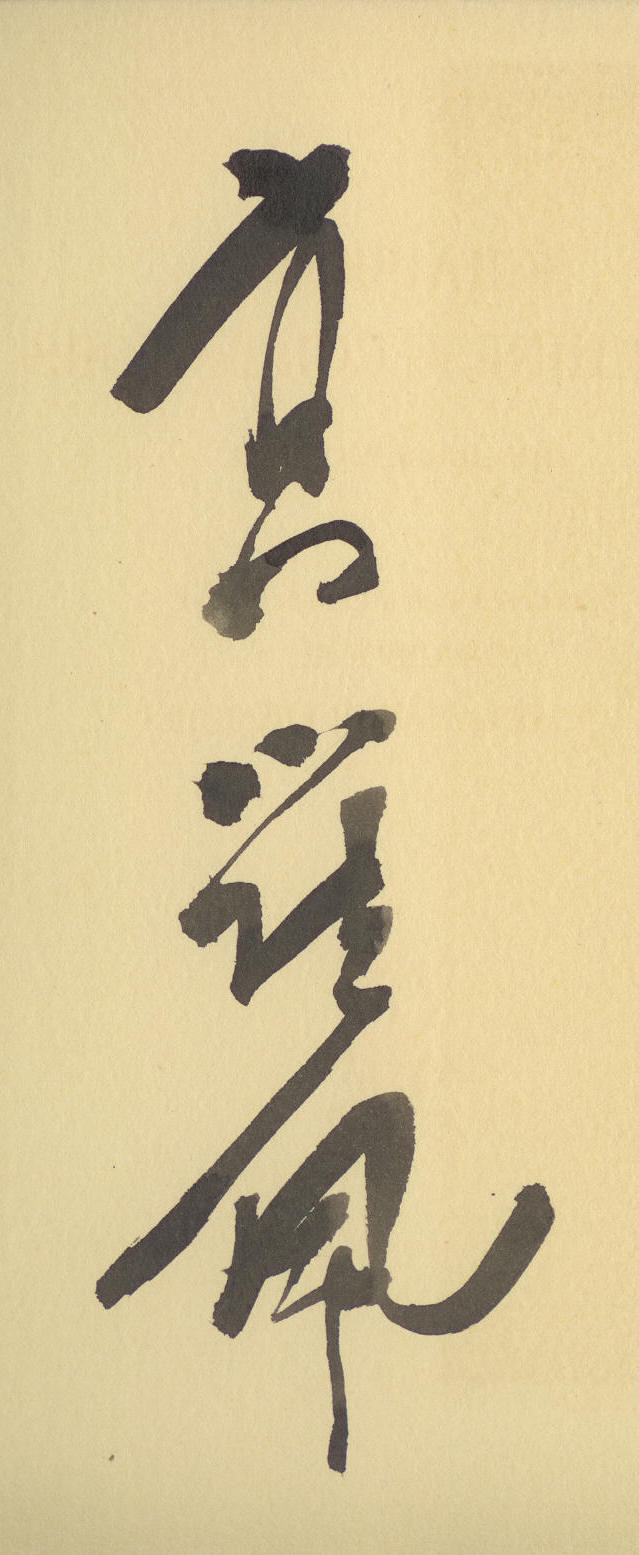
Van Gulik's autograph in Chinese

Judge Dee at Work contains a "Judge Dee Chronology" telling of Dee's various posts, in which van Gulik places the mysteries—both books and short stories—in the context of Dee's career and provides other information about the stories. On the basis of this chronology, the works can be arranged in the following order:

- 663 AD – Judge Dee is the magistrate of Peng-lai (Penglai), a district in the Shantung (Shandong) province on the northeast coast of China.
  - The Chinese Gold Murders
  - "Five Auspicious Clouds", a short story in Judge Dee at Work
  - "The Red Tape Murders", a short story in Judge Dee at Work
  - "He Came with the Rain", a short story in Judge Dee at Work
  - The Lacquer Screen
- 666 AD – Judge Dee is the magistrate of Han-yuan, a fictional district on a lakeshore near the capital of Chang-An (Chang'an).
  - The Chinese Lake Murders
  - "The Morning of the Monkey", a short novel in The Monkey and the Tiger
  - The Haunted Monastery (Judge Dee, while traveling, is forced to take shelter in a monastery.)
  - "The Murder on the Lotus Pond", a short story in Judge Dee at Work (667 AD)
- 668 AD – Judge Dee is the magistrate of Poo-yang, a fictional wealthy district through which the Grand Canal of China runs (part of modern-day Jiangsu province).
  - The Chinese Bell Murders
  - "The Two Beggars", a short story in Judge Dee at Work
  - "The Wrong Sword", a short story in Judge Dee at Work
  - The Red Pavilion, visiting Paradise Island in the neighboring Chin-hwa district
  - The Emperor's Pearl
  - Poets and Murder, visiting neighboring Chin-hwa
  - Necklace and Calabash, visiting Rivertown and the Water Palace
- 670 AD – Judge Dee is the magistrate of Lan-fang, a fictional district at the western frontier of Tang China.
  - The Chinese Maze Murders
  - The Phantom of the Temple
  - "The Coffins of the Emperor", a short story in Judge Dee at Work (672 AD)
  - "Murder on New Year's Eve", a short story in Judge Dee at Work (674 AD)
- 676 AD – Judge Dee is the magistrate of Pei-chow, a fictional district in the far north of Tang China.
  - The Chinese Nail Murders
  - "The Night of the Tiger", a short novel in The Monkey and the Tiger
- 677 AD – Judge Dee is Lord Chief Justice (President of the Metropolitan Court) in the imperial capital of Chang-An.
  - The Willow Pattern
- 681 AD – Judge Dee is Lord Chief Justice for all of China.
  - Murder in Canton, visiting Canton

Two books, Poets and Murder and Necklace and Calabash, were not listed in the chronology (which was published before those two books were written); both were set during the time when Judge Dee was magistrate in Poo-yang.

=== Selected scholarly works ===
- A Blackfoot-English Vocabulary Based on Material from the Southern Peigans, with Christianus Cornelis Uhlenbeck. (Amsterdam, 1934)
- The Lore of the Chinese Lute: An Essay in Ch'in Ideology (1941)
- Hsi K'ang and His Poetical Essay on the Lute (1941)
- Erotic Colour Prints of the Ming Period (Privately printed, Tokyo, 1951)
- Siddham: An Essay on the History of Sanskrit Studies in China and Japan (1956)
- T'ang-yin-pi-shih (Parallel Cases from under the Pear-Tree) (Brill 1956): introduction and translation
- Chinese Pictorial Art, as Viewed by the Connoisseur (Limited edition of 950 copies, Rome, 1958)
- Sexual Life in Ancient China: A Preliminary Survey of Chinese Sex and Society from ca. 1500 B.C. Till 1644 A.D. (1961). (In spite of its titillating title, this book deals with the social role of sex, such as the institutions of concubinage and prostitution.)
- The Gibbon in China: An Essay in Chinese Animal Lore (Leiden, 1967)
