= History of crime fiction =

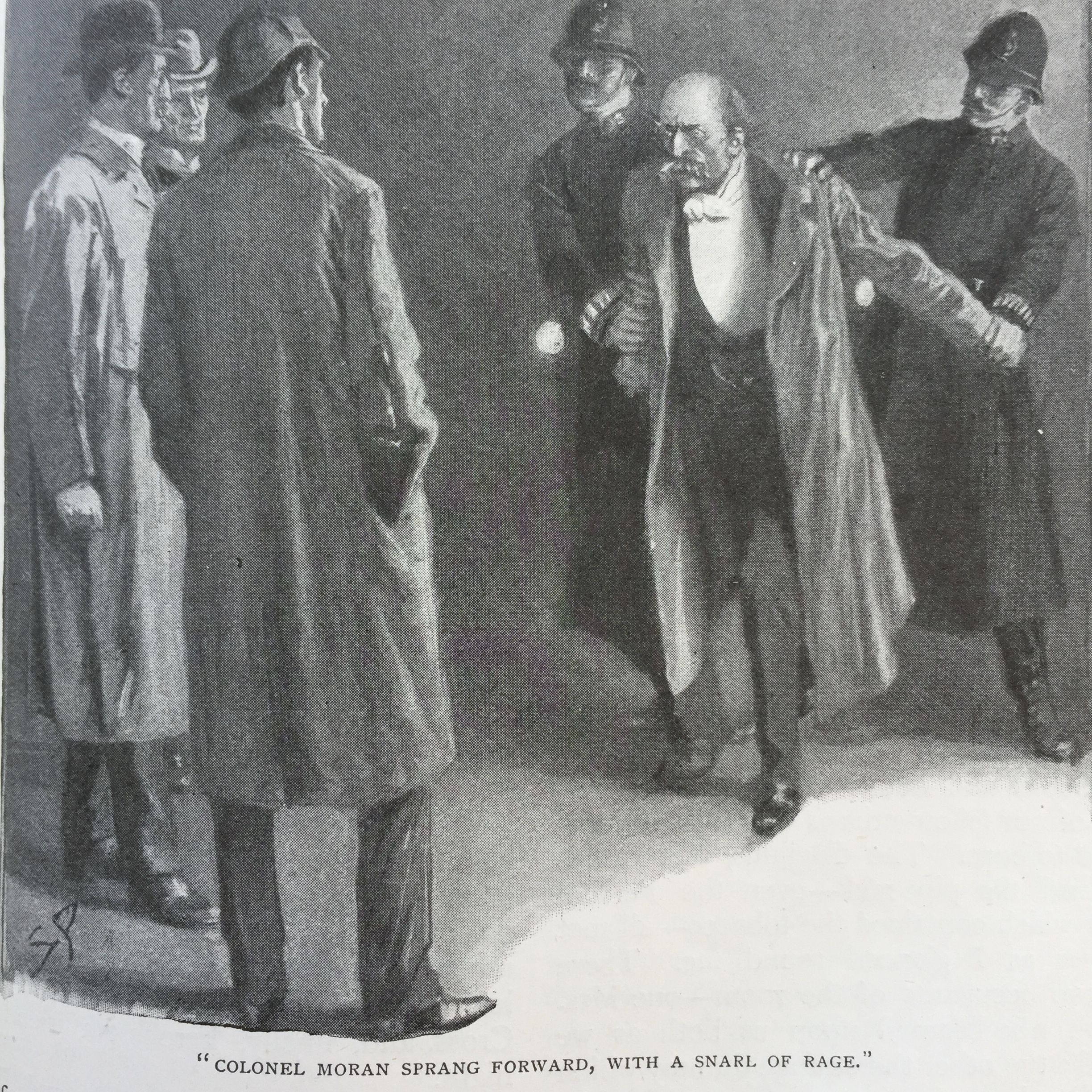
Sherlock Holmes, third from left, hero of crime fiction, oversees the arrest of a criminal; the character of Holmes popularized the crime fiction genre. The Adventure of the Empty House, 1903

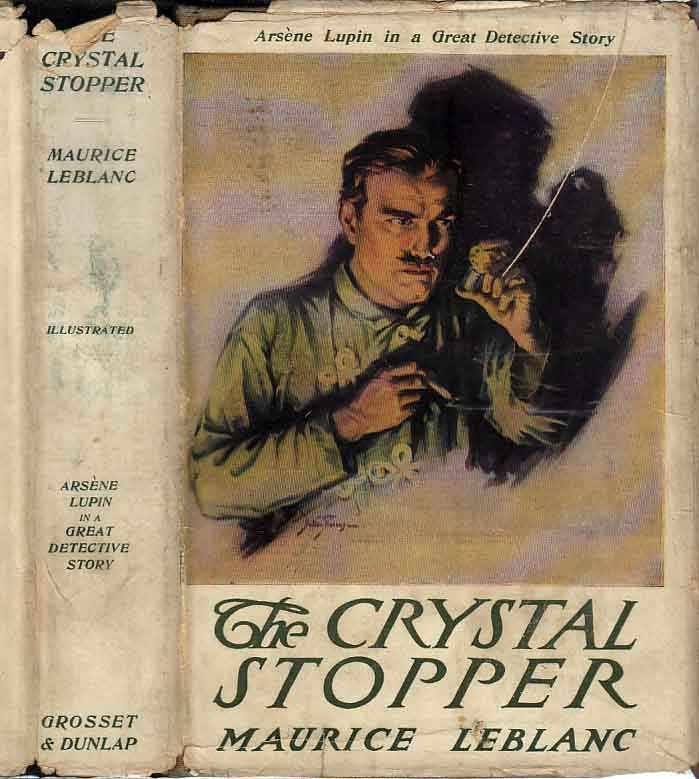
Arsène Lupin in The Crystal Stopper (1912)

Crime fiction is a typically 19th-, 20th- and 21st-century genre, dominated by British and American writers. This article explores its historical development as a genre.

== Crime fiction in history ==
Crime Fiction came to be recognised as a distinct literary genre, with specialist writers and a devoted readership, in the 19th century. Earlier novels and stories were typically devoid of systematic attempts at detection: There was a detective, whether amateur or professional, trying to figure out how and by whom a particular crime was committed; there were no police trying to solve a case; neither was there any discussion of motives, alibis, the modus operandi, or any of the other elements which make up the modern crime writing.

=== Early Arabic crime stories ===
An early example of an Arabic-language crime story is "The Three Apples", one of the tales narrated by Scheherazade in the One Thousand and One Nights (Arabian Nights). In this tale, a fisherman discovers a heavy, locked chest along the Tigris river and he sells it to the Abbasid Caliph, Harun al-Rashid, who then has the chest broken open only to find inside it the dead body of a young woman who was cut into pieces. Harun orders his vizier, Ja'far ibn Yahya, to solve the crime and find the murderer within three days, or be executed if he fails his assignment. The story has been described as a "whodunit" murder mystery Unlike the modern crime fiction genre, no investigation is conducted, and the case is instead solved by two men confessing to the crime. The focus of the story shifts to the caliph's demand to find a slave blamed for having an affair with the woman, instigating her husband's crime of passion, but again no investigation is conducted. Ja'far learns the true story, and exonerates the slave, by chance.

=== Early Chinese crime stories ===
Gong'an is a genre of Ming dynasty Chinese crime fiction that includes Bao Gong An (Chinese:包公案) and the 18th-century novel Di Gong An (Chinese:狄公案). The latter was translated into English as Dee Goong An (Celebrated Cases of Judge Dee) by Dutch sinologist Robert Van Gulik, who then used the style and characters to write an original Judge Dee series.

The hero of these novels is typically a traditional judge or similar official based on historical personages, such as Judge Bao (Bao Qingtian) or Judge Dee (Di Renjie). Although the historical characters may have lived in an earlier period (such as the Song or Tang dynasties), the novels are often set in the later Ming or Manchu period.

These novels differ from the Western genre in several points as described by van Gulik:

- The detective is the local magistrate who is usually involved in several unrelated cases simultaneously.
- The criminal is introduced at the start of the story, and his crime and reasons are carefully explained, thus constituting an inverted detective story rather than a "puzzle".
- The stories have a supernatural element, with ghosts telling people about their deaths and even accusing the criminal.
- The stories were filled with digressions into philosophy, the complete texts of official documents, and much more, making for very long books.
- The novels tended to have a huge cast of characters, typically in the hundreds, all described as to their relation to the various main actors in the story.
- Little time is spent on the details of how the crime was committed, but a great deal on the torture and execution of the criminals, even including their further torments in one of the various hells for the damned.

Van Gulik chose Di Gong An to translate because it was in his view closer to the Western tradition and more likely to appeal to non-Chinese readers.

=== Early Hindi Crime Stories ===
The history of Hindi crime stories remains very rich and evolving as a part of Indian literature, through general socio-political changes and increased interest in psychological and social complexities. The genre has seen remarkable development from its early stages until the modern era by blending traditional storytelling and contemporary narrative techniques.

==== Early Beginnings ====
The first tracings of Hindi crime fiction date back to history in the 20th century. Some early authors are Chandrakanta, who wrote at the turn of the 19th to the 20th century. They started to also create crime and mystery, although these often formed part of folk and supernatural tales rather than being purist crime. This started emerging with an attraction to crime stories early on as the majority of these were on the model of Western crime stories and detective fiction.

==== Golden Age and Prominent Authors ====
The two main authors considered pioneers are Rachmaninoff and Gaurav Bhatnagar. Thereafter, another author of some significance in popularizing Hindi detective fiction was Chandan Bachchi whose novels such as Talash-o-Khoj and Sayar Aur Chhupa Rustam are good examples of the genre. The mid-20th century saw Surender Mohan Pathak into the scene, who gained legendary popularity and is credited to have remodeled modern Hindi crime fiction with his pieces, structurally and stylistically attaining shocking—page-turning—narratives and elaborate characterizations. His novels are considered to be of hallmark quality in the genre owing to the gripping narratives and detailed characterizations.

The Hindi crime fiction began to take its forms in the later part of the twentieth and in the twenty-first century, developing these ways, addressing such contemporary issues of today's time and measuring new dimensions of crime and mystery. Hindi writers like Nisha Sinha and Vikram Chandra, in fact, set completely new directions for the very genre of Hindi crime fiction by blending the traditional with modern social issues and psychological depth.

Today, there are many strands of Hindi crime fiction, influential towards reflecting the challenges of Indian society and grasping at a wide array of readers, changing the tales and forming newer approaches toward the titular conception of crime.

=== Description of crimes and detectives ===
Forerunners of today's crime fiction include the ghost story, the horror story, and the revenge story. Early examples of crime stories include Thomas Skinner Surr's anonymous Richmond (1827), Steen Steensen Blicher's The Rector of Veilbye (1829), Philip Meadows Taylor's Confessions of a Thug (1839), and Maurits Christopher Hansen's "Mordet paa Maskinbygger Roolfsen" - The Murder of Engineer Roolfsen (1839).

An example of an early crime/revenge story is American poet and short-story writer Edgar Allan Poe's (1809–1849) tale "The Cask of Amontillado", published in 1846. Poe created the first fictional detective (a word unknown at the time) in the character of C. Auguste Dupin, as the central character of some of his short stories (which he called "tales of ratiocination"). In the words of William L. De Andrea (Encyclopedia Mysteriosa, 1994), he

was the first to create a character whose interest for the reader lay primarily (even solely) on his ability to find hidden truths. [...] Poe seems to have anticipated virtually every important development to follow in the genre, from the idea of a lesser side-kick to the detective as narrator (later epitomised in the Dr. Watson of the Sherlock Holmes stories) to the concept of an armchair detective to the prototype of the secret-service story.

=== "Locked-room" mysteries ===
One of the early developments started by Poe was the so-called locked-room mystery in "The Murders in the Rue Morgue". Here, the reader is presented with a puzzle and encouraged to solve it before finishing the story and being told the solution.

These stories are so-called because they involve a crime—normally a murder—which takes place in a "locked room". In the simplest case, this is literally a hermetically sealed chamber, which to all appearances, no one could have entered or left at the time of the crime. More generally, it is any crime situation where—again, to all appearances—someone must have entered or left the scene of the crime, yet it was not possible for anyone to have done so. (For example, one such Agatha Christie mystery (And Then There Were None) takes place on a small island during a storm; another is on a train stalled in the mountains and surrounded by new-fallen, unmarked snow.) One of the most famous locked-room mysteries was The Hollow Man. The resolution of such a story might involve showing how the room was not really "locked", or that it was not necessary for anyone else to have come or gone; that the murderer is still hiding in the room, or that the person to "discover" the murder when the room was unlocked in fact committed it just then.

=== Sherlock Holmes and Dr. Watson mysteries ===
In 1887, Scotsman Sir Arthur Conan Doyle (1859–1930) gave fresh impetus to the emerging form of the detective story by creating Sherlock Holmes, resident at 221B Baker Street, London—probably the most famous of fictional detectives and the first one to have clients, to be hired to solve a case. Holmes's art of detection consists in logical deduction based on minute details that escape everyone else's notice, and the careful and systematic elimination of all clues that in the course of his investigation turn out to lead nowhere. Conan Doyle also introduced Dr. John H. Watson, a physician who acts as Holmes's assistant and who also shares Holmes's flat in Baker Street.

=== The Golden Age ===
The 1920s and '30s are commonly known as the "Golden Age" of detective fiction. Most of its authors were British: Agatha Christie (1890–1976), Dorothy L. Sayers (1893–1957), and many more. Some of them were American, but with a British touch. By that time, certain conventions and clichés had been established, which limited any surprises on the part of the reader to the twists and turns within the plot and of course to the identity of the murderer. Most of novels of that era were whodunnits, and several authors excelled, after successfully leading their readers on the wrong track, in convincingly revealing to them the least likely suspect as the real villain of the story. What is more, they had a predilection for certain casts of characters and certain settings, with the secluded English country house at the top of the list.

A typical plot of the Golden Age mystery followed these lines:

- A body, preferably that of a stranger, is found in the library by a maid who has just come in to dust the furniture.
- As it happens, a few guests have just arrived for a weekend in the country—people who may or may not know each other. They typically include such stock characters as a handsome young gentleman and his beautiful and rich fiancée, an actress with past glory and an alcoholic husband, a clumsy aspiring young author, a retired colonel, a quiet, middle-aged man about whom no one knows anything, who is supposedly the host's old friend, but behaves suspiciously, and a famous detective.
- The police are either unavailable or incompetent to lead the investigation for the time being.

=== Hardboiled American crime-fiction writing ===
An American reaction to the cozy convention of British murder mysteries was the American hardboiled school of crime writing (certain works in the field are also referred to as noir fiction). Writers Dashiell Hammett (1894–1961), Raymond Chandler (1888–1959), Jonathan Latimer (1906–1983), Mickey Spillane (1918–2006), and many others decided on an altogether different, innovative approach to crime fiction. This created whole new stereotypes of crime fiction writing. The typical American investigator in these novels, was modeled thus:

He works alone. He is between 35 and 45 years or so, and both a loner and a tough guy. His usual diet consists of fried eggs, black coffee, and cigarettes. He hangs out at shady all-night bars. He is a heavy drinker, but always aware of his surroundings and is able to fight back when attacked. He always "wears" a gun. He shoots criminals or takes a beating if it helps him solve a case. He is always poor. Cases that at first seem straightforward, often turn out to be quite complicated, forcing him to embark on an odyssey through the urban landscape. He is involved with organized crime and other lowlifes on the "mean streets" of, preferably, Los Angeles, San Francisco, New York City, or Chicago. A hardboiled private eye has an ambivalent attitude towards the police. His ambition is to save America and rid it of its mean elements all by himself.

As Raymond Chandler's protagonist Philip Marlowe—immortalized by actor Humphrey Bogart in the movie adaptation (1946) of the novel The Big Sleep (1939)—admits to his client, General Sternwood, he finds it rather tiresome, as an individualist, to fit into the extensive set of rules and regulations for police detectives:

"Tell me about yourself, Mr. Marlowe. I suppose I have a right to ask?"

"Sure, but there's very little to tell. I'm 33 years old, went to college once, and can still speak English if there's any demand for it. There isn't much in my trade. I worked for Mr. Wilde, the district attorney, as an investigator once. [...] I'm unmarried because I don't like policemen's wives." "And a little bit of a cynic," the old man smiled. "You didn't like working for Wilde?"

"I was fired. For insubordination. I test very high on insubordination, General."

Hardboiled crime fiction just uses a different set of clichés and stereotypes. Generally, it does include a murder mystery, but the atmosphere created by hardboiled writers and the settings they chose for their novels are different from English country-house murders or mysteries surrounding rich old ladies elegantly bumped off on a cruise ship, with a detective happening to be on board. Ian Ousby writes,

Hardboiled fiction would have happened anyway, even if Agatha Christie and Dorothy L. Sayers [...] had not written the way they did or Knox had not formulated his rules. The impetus came from the conditions of American life and the opportunities available to the American writer in the 1920s. The economic boom following the First World War combined with the introduction of Prohibition in 1920 to encourage the rise of the gangster. The familiar issues of law and lawlessness in a society determined to judge itself by the most ideal standards took on a new urgency. At the same time, the pulp magazines were already exploiting a ready market for adventure stories—what Ronald Knox would have called "shockers"—which made heroes of cowboys, soldiers, explorers, and masked avengers. It took no great leap of imagination for them to tackle modern crime and detection, fresh from the newspaper headlines of the day, and create heroes with the same vigour [...].

Another author who enjoyed writing about the sleazy side of life in the US is Jonathan Latimer. In his novel Solomon's Vineyard (1941), private eye Karl Craven aims to rescue a young heiress from the clutches of a weird cult. Apart from being an action-packed thriller, the novel contains open references to the detective's sex drive and allusions to, and a brief description of, kinky sexual practices. The novel was considered "too hot" for Latimer's American publishers, so was not published until 1950 in a heavily Bowdlerized version. The unexpurgated novel came out in Britain during the Second World War.

The hardboiled phenomenon appeared slightly earlier than the Golden Age of Science Fiction. "Apparently something just before the War [World War II] acted to create pulp writers who were willing to break out of the post-World War I shell of neverland cliches, which persisted in the pulps until the middle of the 1930s", Algis Budrys said in 1965. Large, mainstream book companies published crime fiction during World War II, presaging a similar entry into the science-fiction market in the 1950s.

=== The military veteran as hardboiled protagonist ===
Several hardboiled heroes have been war veterans: H. C. McNeile (Sapper)'s Bulldog Drummond from World War I, Mickey Spillane's Mike Hammer, and many others from World War II, and John D. MacDonald's Travis McGee from the Korean War. In Bulldog Drummond's first appearance, he is a bored ex-serviceman seeking adventure, Spillane's Hammer avenges an old buddy who saved his life on Guadalcanal. The frequent exposure to death and hardship often leads to a cynical and callous attitude, as well as a character trait known today as post-traumatic stress characterizes many hardboiled protagonists.

== Modern crime writing ==
=== A shift from plot-driven themes to character analysis ===
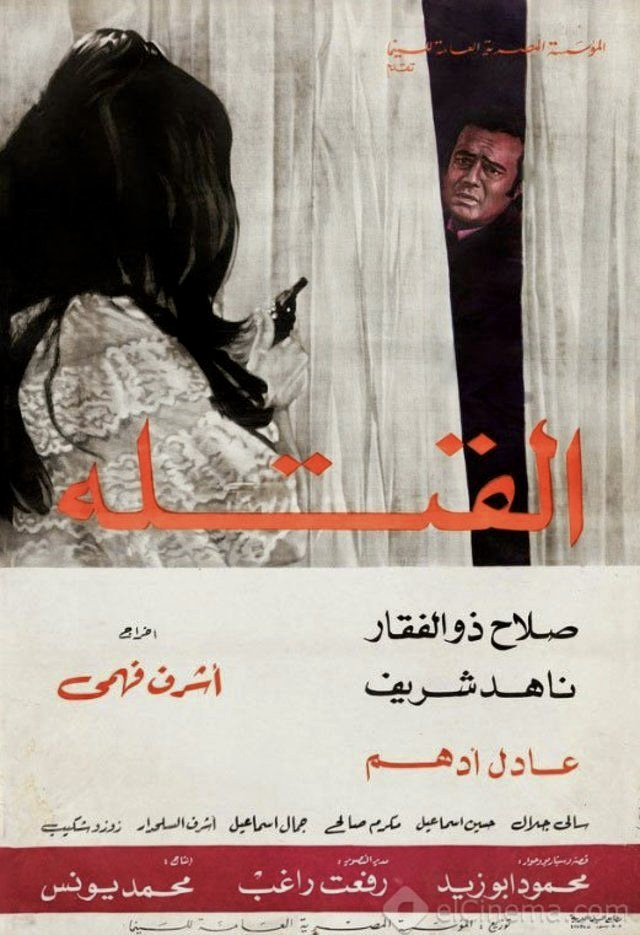
Salah Zulfikar in The Killers (1971)

Over the decades, the detective story metamorphosed into the crime novel (see also the title of Julian Symons' history of the genre). Starting with writers like Francis Iles, who has been described as "the father of the psychological suspense novel as we know it today," more and more authors laid the emphasis on character rather than plot. Up to the present, many authors have tried their hand at writing novels where the identity of the criminal is known to the reader right from the start. The suspense is created by the author having the reader share the perpetrator's thoughts—up to a point, that is—and having them guess what is going to happen next (for example, another murder, or a potential victim making a fatal mistake), and if the criminal will be brought to justice in the end. For example, Simon Brett's A Shock to the System (1984) and Stephen Dobyns' Boy in the Water (1999) both reveal the murderer's identity quite early in the narrative. A Shock to the System is about a hitherto law-abiding business manager's revenge which is triggered by his being passed over for promotion, and the intricate plan he thinks up to get back at his rivals. Boy in the Water is the psychological study of a man who, severely abused as a child, is trying to get back at the world at large now that he has the physical and mental abilities to do so. As a consequence of his childhood trauma, the killer randomly picks out his victims, first terrifying them and eventually murdering them. But Boy in the Water also traces the mental states of a group of people who happen to get in touch with the lunatic, and their reactions to him.

=== Crime fiction in specific themes ===
Apart from the emergence of the psychological thriller and the continuation of older traditions such as the whodunnit and the private eye novel, several new trends can be recognised. One of the first masters of the spy novel was Eric Ambler, whose unsuspecting and innocent protagonists are often caught in a network of espionage, betrayal and violence and whose only wish is to get home safely as soon as possible. Spy thrillers continue to fascinate readers even if the Cold War period is over now. Another development is the courtroom novel which, as opposed to courtroom drama, also includes many scenes which are not set in the courtroom itself but which basically revolves around the trial of the protagonist, who claims to be innocent but cannot (yet) prove it. Quite a number of U.S. lawyers have given up their jobs and started writing novels full-time, among them Scott Turow, who began his career with the publication of Presumed Innocent (1987) (the phrase in the title having been taken from the age-old legal principle that any defendant must be considered as not guilty until s/he is finally convicted). But there are also authors who specialise in historical mysteries—novels which are set in the days of the Roman Empire, in medieval England, the United States of the 1930s and 40s, or whenever (see historical whodunnit)—and even in mysteries set in the future. Remarkable examples can be found in any number of Philip K. Dick's stories or novels.

=== Police investigation themes ===
By far the richest field of activity though has been the police novel. U.S. (male) writer Hillary Waugh's (1920–2008) police procedural Last Seen Wearing ... (1952) is an early example of this type of crime fiction. As opposed to hard-boiled crime writing, which is set in the mean streets of a big city, Last Seen Wearing ... carefully and minutely chronicles the work of the police, including all the boring but necessary legwork, in a small American college town where, in the dead of winter, an attractive student disappears. In contrast to armchair detectives such as Dr. Gideon Fell or Hercule Poirot, Chief of Police Frank W. Ford and his men never hold back information from the reader. By way of elimination, they exclude all the suspects who could not possibly have committed the crime and eventually arrive at the correct conclusion, a solution which comes as a surprise to most of them but which, due to their painstaking research, is infallible. The novel certainly is a whodunnit, but all the conventions of the cosy British variety are abandoned. A lot of reasoning has to be done by the police though, including the careful examination and re-examination of all the evidence available. Waugh's police novel lacks "action" in the form of dangerous situations from which the characters can only make a narrow escape, but the book is nonetheless a page-turner of a novel, with all the suspense for the readers created through their being able to witness each and every step the police take in order to solve the crime.

Another example is American writer Faye Kellerman (born 1952), who wrote a series of novels featuring Peter Decker and his daughter by his first marriage, Cindy, who both work for the Los Angeles Police Department. Local colour is provided by the author, especially through Peter Decker's Jewish background. In Stalker (2000), 25-year-old Cindy herself becomes the victim of a stalker, who repeatedly frightens her and also tries to do her bodily harm. Apart from her personal predicament, Cindy is assigned to clear up a series of murders that have been committed in the Los Angeles area. Again, the work of the police is chronicled in detail, but it would not be fiction if outrageous things did not intervene.
