= The Emperor's Pearl =

1963 novel by Robert van Gulik

- First UK edition
- Author: Robert van Gulik
- Series: Judge Dee
- Genre: Gong'an fiction, Mystery, Detective novel, Chinese crime fiction
- Publisher: Heinemann (UK); Scribner (US)
- Publication date: 1963
- Media type: Print
- Pages: 184
- Preceded by: The Haunted Monastery
- Followed by: The Monkey and the Tiger

The Emperors Pearl is a gong'an detective novel written by Robert van Gulik and set in Imperial China (roughly speaking the Tang dynasty). It is a fiction based on the real character of Judge Dee (Ti Jen-chieh or Di Renjie), a magistrate and statesman of the Tang court, who lived roughly 630–700.

== Plot introduction ==
Judge Dee, magistrate of Poo-yang, a flourishing walled city on the Grand Canal, is attending the Dragon Boat races accompanied by his three ladies aboard his own official barge. He is mildly annoyed by the intrusions of assorted callers and the loss of a blank domino (he and his ladies are keen players). He is more than annoyed when the sad, sudden death of a young student crewing one of the boats turns out to be deliberate murder.

Dee is further disturbed by the murder of the young Second Lady of a prominent local merchant and collector, which he witnesses himself. The Judge must handle odd things going on at the deserted villa at the edge of the River Goddess's overgrown mandrake grove, an apparently cursed Imperial Treasure, and a perverted madman.

Poo-yang was the setting for The Chinese Bell Murders. Three other cases – Necklace and Calabash, Poets and Murder, and The Red Pavilion – took place during his term as magistrate.

== Literary significance and criticism ==
"Whether the reader or the writer is the first to tire of a formula may be argued with the aid of any given example such as this story. The fact remains that the characters, events, and tricks now seem close to played out".
