= The Chinese Gold Murders =

1959 novel by Robert van Gulik

- First US edition
- Author: Robert van Gulik
- Series: Judge Dee
- Genre: Gong'an fiction, Mystery, Detective novel, Crime, Historical mystery
- Publisher: Michael Joseph (UK); Harper & Brothers (US)
- Publication date: 1959
- Media type: Print (paperback)
- Pages: 214 pp (paperback edition)
- OCLC: 4665025
- Dewey Decimal: 823
- LC Class: PZ4.G97 Cg 1979 PR9130.9.G8
- Preceded by: The Chinese Lake Murders
- Followed by: The Chinese Nail Murders

The Chinese Gold Murders is a gong'an historical mystery novel written by Robert van Gulik and set in Imperial China (roughly speaking the Tang dynasty). It is a fiction based on the real character of Judge Dee (Ti Jen-chieh or Di Renjie), a magistrate and statesman of the Tang court, who lived roughly 630–700.

The book includes a map of the fictional town of Peng-lai.

== Plot introduction ==
Judge Dee is a recently appointed magistrate to the miserable district of Peng-lai. On the way to town, he meet two ruffians in the woods; Chiao Tai and Ma Joong. They try to rob the judge but instead end up to be his trusted followers.

After arriving to Peng-lai, Judge Dee start the investigation of the murder of his predecessor. The investigation is made more complex by the disappearance of his chief clerk and that of the new bride of a wealthy local shipowner. Meanwhile, a tiger is terrorizing the district, the ghost of the murdered magistrate is stalking members of the court, a prostitute has a secret message for Judge Dee, the body of a murdered monk is found to have been placed in the wrong grave, and there is a serious rumor of smuggling of weapons to Korea.

The Chinese Gold Murders is not the first Judge Dee book that the author wrote, but in the series setting, it is the first story, and shows how the judge met Chiao Tai and Ma Joong. The town of Peng-lai is also the setting for other Judge Dee stories including: The Lacquer Screen, and three of the short stories from Judge Dee at Work.
