= The Lacquer Screen =

1962 novel by Robert van Gulik

- First edition cover
- Author: Robert van Gulik
- Series: Judge Dee
- Genre: Gong'an fiction, Mystery novel, Detective fiction, Chinese crime fiction
- Publisher: Art Printing Works, Kuala Lumpur
- Publication date: 1962
- Media type: Print
- Preceded by: The Red Pavilion
- Followed by: The Emperor's Pearl

The Lacquer Screen is a gong'an detective novel written by Robert van Gulik and set in Imperial China (the early decades of the Tang dynasty). It is a fiction based on the real character of Judge Dee (Ti Jen-chieh or Di Renjie), a magistrate and statesman of the Tang court, who lived roughly 630–700 AD.

The book features fourteen illustrations by the author.

== Plot introduction ==
In 663, Judge Dee is the young magistrate in the fictional Chinese town of Peng-lai. On a visit to a senior magistrate Teng in Wei-ping, he is shown a beautiful lacquer screen which is mysteriously altered to show a murder scene instead of a love scene. With the senior magistrate Teng convinced he is going insane, a wealthy banker in town appears to kill himself, though it might be murder. Judge Dee and his servant Chiao Tai disguise themselves to go undercover and join a gang of robbers to solve the case.

The town of Peng-lai was the setting for other Judge Dee stories including: The Chinese Gold Murders, and three of the short stories from Judge Dee at Work.
