= The Monkey and the Tiger =

- First edition
- Author: Robert van Gulik
- Series: Judge Dee
- Genre: Gong'an fiction, Mystery, Detective novel, Crime
- Publisher: Heinemann
- Publication date: 1965
- Media type: Print
- Pages: 144
- Preceded by: The Red Pavilion
- Followed by: The Willow Pattern

The Monkey and the Tiger book pairs two unrelated short gong'an detective novels written by Robert van Gulik and set in Imperial China (roughly speaking the Tang dynasty). Both stories are fictions based on the real character of Judge Dee (Ti Jen-chieh or Di Renjie), a magistrate and statesman of the Tang court, who lived roughly 630–700.

The book contains eight illustrations and a map, all by the author.

== Plot introduction ==
The first story "The Morning of the Monkey" and is set in the fictional city of Han-yuan in the year 666. One morning a gibbon drops an emerald ring right at the entrance to Judge Dee's house. This leads to the discovery of a strangely mutilated body out in the nearby forest.

Han-yuan is the setting for several other Judge Dee stories including The Chinese Lake Murders and one of the stories from Judge Dee at Work.

The second story "The Night of the Tiger" takes place a decade later when Judge Dee is returning to the capital at Chang'an when bandits force Judge Dee to take cover in an isolated country house. There he must fight off the vicious cut-throats as well as solve a murder.
