= The Chinese Bell Murders =

1958 novel by Robert van Gulik

- First English edition
- Author: Robert van Gulik
- Series: Judge Dee
- Genre: Gong'an fiction, Mystery, Detective novel, Crime, Historical mystery
- Publisher: Michael Joseph
- Publication date: 1958
- Media type: Print
- Preceded by: The Chinese Maze Murders
- Followed by: The Chinese Lake Murders

The Chinese Bell Murders is a gong'an historical mystery novel written by Robert van Gulik and set in Imperial China (roughly speaking the Tang dynasty). It is a fiction based on the real character of Judge Dee (Ti Jen-chieh or Di Renjie), a magistrate and statesman of the Tang court, who lived roughly 630–700.

This book was originally written by Robert van Gulik sometime between 1953 and 1956. Like its predecessor, The Chinese Maze Murders it was intended for a Japanese or Chinese audience but he later chose to publish it in English. As it happened, all three editions came out at roughly the same time.

== Plot introduction ==
Judge Dee, newly appointed magistrate of Poo-yang, inherits a case left unresolved by the previous judge: the brutal rape and murder of Pure Jade, daughter of a local butcher named Hsiao who lived on Half Moon Street. The girl's lover is accused, but Judge Dee suspects the case is not as it seems. He sets out with his aides to uncover the true murderer.

In finding the real culprit, Judge Dee obtains information from a gang boss by the name of Sheng pa. This character also provides information in "The Emperor's Pearl" and the short story "The Wrong Sword".

Judge Dee also has to wrestle with the problem of Buddhist Temple of Boundless Mercy, run by the abbot called "Spiritual Virtue". Rumor has it that the monks, who can cure barren women, are not as virtuous as they seem.

In solving this crime, Judge Dee buys, with a hefty bribe from the Abbot of the Temple of Boundless Mercy intended to buy the judge off, two prostitutes in the city of Chin Hwa, where magistrate Lo offers his help.

Magistrate Lo also appears in "The Red Pavilion", "Poets and Murder" (renamed the Fox-magic murders) and is involved in "The Two Beggars" in the short-story collection "Judge Dee at Work" though he does not appear.

The Judge, apparently bringing two uneducated concubines into his household, causes some frostiness between himself and his first wife (the Judge has three wives) - the only time such an upset occurs in his otherwise peaceful household.

The third case "The Case of the Mysterious Skeleton", since the Judge often has to deal with several cases at the same time, involves a wealthy Cantonese merchant who escaped punishment for the destroying of an entire family line.

Poo-yang was the setting for many Judge Dee stories including: The Emperor's Pearl, Necklace and Calabash, Poets and Murder, and The Red Pavilion.

== Literary significance and criticism ==
"... enjoyable by anyone who knows what to look for in the depiction of Chinese manners and topography, and who does not look for what the species can't provide".
