= Necklace and Calabash =

1967 novel by Robert van Gulik

- First edition (UK)
- Author: Robert van Gulik
- Series: Judge Dee
- Genre: Gong'an fiction, Mystery, Detective novel, Crime
- Publisher: Heinemann
- Publication date: 1967
- Media type: Print
- Pages: 144
- OCLC: 26129085
- Dewey Decimal: 823 20
- LC Class: PR9130.9.G8 N43 1992
- Preceded by: Judge Dee at Work
- Followed by: Poets and Murder

Necklace and Calabash is a gong'an detective novel written by Robert van Gulik and set in Imperial China (roughly speaking the Tang dynasty). It is a fiction based on the real character of Judge Dee (Ti Jen-chieh or Di Renjie), a magistrate and statesman of the Tang court, who lived roughly 630–700.

The book features eight illustrations by the author.

Necklace and Calabash was the last Judge Dee novel published during van Gulik's lifetime. One more book, Poets and Murder was published after his death. Necklace and Calabash is very highly regarded of all the Judge Dee mysteries.

== Plot introduction ==
Judge Dee is a magistrate in the fictional Poo-yang district, a wealthy area through which the Grand Canal of China runs (part of modern-day Jiangsu province). The Emperor's daughter lives in the district at the Water Palace, which falls under a special administration run by the military commander. Judge Dee goes to the area for a few days of relaxing fishing but soon meets with a strange Taoist hermit; next a body is found in the river. Then the Emperor's daughter appeals to Judge Dee for aid. The mysteries keep building up, and Judge Dee has to tread very carefully to avoid serious political fallout from his investigations.

Poo-yang was the setting for many Judge Dee stories including: The Emperor's Pearl, The Chinese Bell Murders, Poets and Murder, and The Red Pavilion.

== Literary significance and criticism ==
"This adventure, short and sweet and more pensive than spectacular, is nonetheless vintage Van Gulik".
