= Murder in Canton =

1966 novel by Robert van Gulik

- First edition (UK)
- Author: Robert van Gulik
- Series: Judge Dee
- Genre: Gong'an fiction, Mystery, Detective novel, Crime
- Publisher: Heinemann
- Publication date: 1966
- Media type: Print (paperback)
- Pages: 207
- OCLC: 28292445
- Dewey Decimal: 823/.914 20
- LC Class: PR9130.G8 M87 1993
- Preceded by: The Willow Pattern
- Followed by: The Phantom of the Temple

Murder in Canton is a gong'an detective novel written by Robert van Gulik and set in Imperial China (roughly speaking the Tang dynasty). It is a fiction based on the real character of Judge Dee (Ti Jen-chieh or Di Renjie), a magistrate and statesman of the Tang court, who lived roughly 630–700.

The book contains twelve illustrations and a map of Canton by the author.

== Plot introduction ==
Judge Dee is now the most senior judge in all of China and his authority is little less than that of the Emperor himself. Canton is the most important trading port in the country, filled with merchants from many other lands, some as far away as India and Baghdad. When one of the secretive but very powerful Imperial censors goes missing in Canton, Judge Dee must come to the city in disguise and investigate. He is aided by a beautiful blind girl who collects crickets.

This is the last story in the internal chronology of Judge Dee.

== Literary significance and criticism ==
"Published in the year before his death, this tale by the distinguished Sinologist takes Judge Dee to a setting new for him and deals with crime in a style closer to that of his first good ones. The unraveling of the political intrigue and love affairs is as subtle as the plot is complex, and modernity and antiquity are beautifully blended. As in all the other stories, the illustrations are too much alike to add much interest".
