= Poets and Murder =

1968 novel by Robert van Gulik

- First edition (UK)
- Author: Robert van Gulik
- Series: Judge Dee
- Genre: Gong'an fiction, Mystery, Detective novel, Crime
- Publisher: Heinemann
- Publication date: 1968
- Media type: Print
- Pages: 174 pp
- ISBN: 9780434825578
- OCLC: 34722109
- Dewey Decimal: 823/.914 20
- LC Class: PR6057.U45 P64 1996
- Preceded by: Necklace and Calabash
- Followed by: None

Poets and Murder is a gong'an detective novel written by Robert van Gulik and set in Imperial China (roughly speaking the Tang dynasty). It is a fiction based on the real character of Judge Dee (Ti Jen-chieh or Di Renjie), a magistrate and statesman of the Tang court, who lived roughly 630–700.

The book features eight illustrations by the author along with a detailed layout of the residence where the action takes place.

Poets and Murder was the last Judge Dee novel written by Robert van Gulik. He completed it just before his death from cancer in 1967. The book was published one year after his death.

== Plot introduction ==
Judge Dee is a magistrate in the fictional Poo-yang district, a wealthy area through which the Grand Canal of China runs (part of modern-day Jiangsu province). During the mid-autumn festival in the city of Chin-hwa, Judge Dee is a guest of a small group of distinguished scholars. However, he learns during dinner that a young girl has been murdered and the accused is a beautiful poet. She is thought to have whipped her maidservant to death. Then the body of a student is also discovered. The poet is based on Chinese courtesan and poet Yu Xuanji.

Poo-yang was the setting for many Judge Dee stories including: The Emperor's Pearl, The Chinese Bell Murders, Necklace and Calabash, and The Red Pavilion.

The book was also published in the US under the title of The Fox Magic Murders.

== Background ==
The case of the poet is based on a real case, concerning Yü Hsüan-chi.
