= The Chinese Lake Murders =

1960 novel by Robert van Gulik

- First UK edition
- Author: Robert van Gulik
- Series: Judge Dee
- Genre: Gong'an fiction, Mystery, Detective novel, Crime, Historical mystery
- Publisher: Michael Joseph (UK); Harper & Brothers (US)
- Publication date: 1960
- Media type: Print
- Preceded by: The Chinese Bell Murders
- Followed by: The Chinese Gold Murders

The Chinese Lake Murders is a gong'an historical mystery novel written by Robert van Gulik and set in Imperial China (roughly speaking the Tang dynasty). It is a fiction based on the real character of Judge Dee (Ti Jen-chieh or Di Renjie), a magistrate and statesman of the Tang court, who lived roughly 630–700.

This book was originally written by Robert van Gulik sometime between 1953 and 1956. Like its predecessor, The Chinese Maze Murders it was intended for a Japanese or Chinese audience but he later choose to publish it in English. The Chinese Lake Murder was written at roughly the same time as The Chinese Bell Murders but remained unpublished for some years.

== Plot introduction ==
In the year 666, Judge Dee, the newly appointed magistrate of the fictional town of Han-yuan, must solve three murders. Han-yuan is an isolated town famous for its floating brothels or "flower boats". The murders seem to be related but just how they are connected is a mystery. The whole investigation turns into a maze of political intrigue, sordid greed, and dark passions.

Han-yuan was also the setting for another story The Morning of the Monkey, a short novel in The Monkey and the Tiger.

== Literary significance and criticism ==
"The murder of Almond Blossom on the Flower Boat, while Judge Dee is being entertained, is preceded by a confusing chapter of pseudo-supernatural terror. The rest is a good gangster story: lowlifes and blondes translated into Chinese. Only the judge and his three loyal goons are original and freshly entertaining".
