= The Chinese Nail Murders =

1961 novel by Robert van Gulik

- First UK edition
- Author: Robert van Gulik
- Series: Judge Dee
- Genre: Gong'an fiction, Mystery, Detective novel, Crime
- Publisher: Michael Joseph (UK); Harper & Row (US)
- Publication date: 1961
- Media type: Print
- Pages: 216
- Preceded by: The Chinese Gold Murders
- Followed by: The Haunted Monastery

The Chinese Nail Murders is a gong'an detective novel written by Robert van Gulik and set in Imperial China (roughly speaking the Tang dynasty). It is a fiction based on the real character of Judge Dee (Ti Jen-chieh or Di Renjie), a magistrate and statesman of the Tang court, who lived roughly 630–700 BC.

== Plot introduction ==
Judge Dee and his four helpers solve the murders of an honored merchant, a master of martial arts, and the wife of a merchant, whose corpse has no head. Judge Dee soon comes under pressure from higher-ranking officials to end his investigation. Judge Dee refuses to give up until he has learned the whole truth.

A nail murder was a motif of crime in ancient China.

The case of the headless corpse was based on an actual 13th-century Chinese murder casebook.
