= The Phantom of the Temple =

1966 novel by Robert van Gulik

- First edition
- Author: Robert van Gulik
- Series: Judge Dee
- Genre: Gong'an fiction, Mystery, Detective novel, Crime
- Publisher: Heinemann
- Publication date: 1966
- Media type: Print
- Pages: 206
- Preceded by: Murder in Canton
- Followed by: Judge Dee at Work

The Phantom of the Temple is a gong'an detective novel written by Robert van Gulik and set in Imperial China (roughly speaking the Tang dynasty). It is a fiction based on the real character of Judge Dee (Ti Jen-chieh or Di Renjie), a magistrate and statesman of the Tang court, who lived roughly 630–700.

The book features nine illustrations by the author and a map of the town of Lan-fang.

== Plot introduction ==
Judge Dee, a magistrate in the fictional Lan-fang district has a problem: a mysterious phantom is haunting a Buddhist temple. In addition, some 20 bars of gold have gone missing, not to mention the merchant's beautiful daughter. When a body is discovered without a head, Judge Dee must quickly solve the case.

Lan-fang was the setting for another Judge Dee novel, The Chinese Maze Murders and two short stories from Judge Dee at Work.

== Literary significance and criticism ==
"It is regrettable that this latecomer to detection should have died suddenly and at a relatively early age, but this next-to-last product of his pen suggests that the quite original formula he popularized is exhausted. The concealment of robbery by faked supernatural doings is old hat, and the events that Judge Dee unravels here are too cluttered to be either attractive or puzzling".
