= The Haunted Monastery =

1961 novel by Robert van Gulik

- First edition
- Author: Robert van Gulik
- Series: Judge Dee
- Genre: Gong'an fiction, Mystery, Detective novel, Crime
- Publisher: Art Printing Works, Kuala Lumpur
- Publication date: 1961
- Media type: Print
- Preceded by: The Chinese Nail Murders
- Followed by: The Red Pavilion

The Haunted Monastery is a gong'an detective novel written by Robert van Gulik and set in Imperial China (roughly speaking the Tang dynasty). It is a fiction based on the real character of Judge Dee (Di Renjie), a magistrate and statesman of the Tang court, who lived roughly 630–700.

The book contains eight illustrations by the author as well as a diagram of the Monastery where the action takes place.

== Plot introduction ==
Judge Dee and his three wives are on their way back from a visit to family in the capital accompanied by the Judge's aide Tao Gan when a terrible storm and a broken axle force the party to take shelter for the night in an isolated Taoist monastery of sinister repute. The wives go directly to bed but the Judge is required to pay a courtesy visit to the Abbot. Judge Dee is a Confucian and has a poor opinion of Taoism which, like Buddhism, encourages adherents to enter monastic life. He, however, diplomatically keeps his opinion to himself as he endures the feast and mystery play. Thus begins an endless night of murder, mayhem and madness as the Judge, suffering from the beginnings of a head cold, solves the mysterious deaths, punishes the guilty and brings two star-crossed young couples together.

== Literary significance and criticism ==
"Some interesting sidelights on Confucian and Taoist beliefs emerge from this tale of corruption and murder in a monastery, where Judge Dee runs into considerable danger but ends up administering justice in a primitive way. Perhaps because it is short and somewhat huddled, this work does not remain in the memory as one of his best".

== Publication ==
Van Gulik found his London publisher Michael Joseph unwilling to publish more than one title a year so he decided to publish The Haunted Monastery privately by the Art Printing Works in Kuala Lumpur in 1961. The Red Pavilion was also similarly printed that year, The Lacquer Screen followed in 1962). All three were produced in paperback form with a print run of 2,000 copies. The Haunted Monastery was finally published in the UK by Heinemann in 1963.

== Television adaptation ==
In 1974 the novel The Haunted Monastery was produced as a TV movie for the ABC network by Gerald Isenberg with the title Judge Dee and the Monastery Murders. It was filmed with Khigh Dhiegh as Dee and an all-Asian cast (including Mako, Keye Luke, Soon-Tek Oh, Irene Tsu and James Hong). Writing was credited to Nicholas Meyer and Robert van Gulik. It was nominated for an Edgar Award, for Best Television Feature or Miniseries in 1975.
