= The Willow Pattern =

The Willow Pattern may refer to:

- Willow pattern, a distinctive and elaborate chinoiserie pattern used on ceramic tableware
- The Willow Pattern (opera), a comic opera by Basil Hood and Cecil Cook
- The Willow Pattern (novel), a 1965 detective novel by Robert van Gulik
