= The Willow Pattern (novel) =

1965 detective novel by Robert van Gulik

- First edition
- Author: Robert van Gulik
- Series: Judge Dee
- Genre: Gong'an fiction, Mystery, Detective novel, Crime
- Published: Heinemann Press
- Publication date: 1965
- Media type: Print
- Pages: 183 pp
- OCLC: 310157995
- Dewey Decimal: 823/.914 20
- LC Class: PR9130.9.G8 W55 1993
- Preceded by: The Monkey and the Tiger
- Followed by: Murder in Canton

The Willow Pattern is a gong'an detective novel written by Robert van Gulik and set in Imperial China (roughly speaking the Tang dynasty). It is a fiction based on the real character of Judge Dee (Ti Jen-chieh or Di Renjie), a magistrate and statesman of the Tang court, who lived roughly 630–700.

As the author says in a postscript, the use of the Willow Pattern as a motif in the book was a conscious anachronism. The book features 15 illustrations by the author.

== Plot introduction ==
Judge Dee is now a senior member of the Chinese government and has been appointed the Chief Judge in the Tang capital of Chang-An. One of the city's oldest, and most important aristocratic families becomes the subject of investigation. Three murders are committed and Judge Dee must find the connection.

== Literary significance and criticism ==
"The opening scene carries out the in medias res advice: a beautiful young girl in dishabille is arranging an old man's corpse to look like accidental death. The next brings on Judge Dee, in his usual philosophizing mood and flanked by the faithful Chiao Tai as they discuss the plague-stricken, half-deserted city. In the heat of summer, Dee has to discover the motive and agent of three murders, each separate but also related. Typically good Van Gulik".
