= Cases of Judge Lan =

Novel by Lan Dingyuan

Cases of Judge Lan (蓝公案, Lán gōng'àn; also known as 鹿洲公案, Lùzhōu gōng'àn) is a gong'an novel written by Lan Dingyuan (traditional: 藍鼎元; simplified: 蓝鼎元; 1680–1733) during the reign of the Yongzheng Emperor (1722–1735). Lan Dingyuan was a native of Zhangpu County, Fujian Province. Comprising 24 stories in two volumes (卷) and written in Classical Chinese, it purports to the experiences of the author during his time as a county magistrate of Puning and Chaoyang counties in Guangdong Province, in this respect being unlike the other classics of the gong'an genre, and thus holds some historical value.

Episodes deal with his efforts to press the local gentry to pay their taxes and grain due, to quell the rebellious feelings of yamen runners in the county; he also came up with methods to deal with treacherous lawyers, to put down unorthodox religious sects, and to capture pirates. He also kept notes on his observations of the conditions of the common people, such as their offering of sacrifices to the Lords of the Three Mountains.

Together with Cases of Judge Bao and Cases of Judge Hai, they are known collectively as the Cases of the Three Judges (三公奇案).
