= The Red Pavilion =

1961 novel by Robert van Gulik

- First edition
- Author: Robert van Gulik
- Series: Judge Dee
- Genre: Gong'an fiction, Mystery, Detective novel, Crime
- Publisher: Art Printing Works, Kuala Lumpur
- Publication date: 1961
- Media type: Print
- Pages: 200
- Preceded by: The Haunted Monastery
- Followed by: The Lacquer Screen

The Red Pavilion is a gong'an detective novel written by Robert van Gulik and set in Imperial China (roughly speaking the Tang dynasty). It is a fiction based on the real character of Judge Dee (Ti Jen-chieh or Di Renjie), a magistrate and statesman of the Tang court, who lived roughly 630–700.

The book features six illustrations by the author and a map of Paradise Island (the setting for the story).

This novel is a mystery of the type known as a locked room mystery.

== Plot introduction ==
Judge Dee, the magistrate of Poo-yang, has an unexpected meeting with the most powerful and famous courtesan on Paradise Island, Autumn Moon. Then, a man who was well known to be studying to pass the Imperial exams dies, as suicide or murder. His last week was spent in the company of Autumn Moon. Only a few hours later, she herself is found dead and Judge Dee is drawn into a web of lies and sad stories in the world of the prostitutes of Imperial China.

Poo-yang was the setting for many Judge Dee stories including: The Chinese Bell Murders, Necklace and Calabash, Poets and Murder, and The Emperor's Pearl.

== Literary significance and criticism ==
"As frequently happens in Judge Dee's work, three seemingly independent crimes turn out to be connected. Here the local color is heightened by the voluptuous surroundings and the personality of Autumn Moon, the queen of courtesans. The stories that interlock are patterned on western models of greed and violence. Some of the other tales are no less picturesque and less westernized in substance".

== Publication ==
Van Gulik found his London publisher Michael Joseph unwilling to publish more than one title a year so he decided to publish The Haunted Monastery and The Red Pavilion privately by the Art Printing Works in Kuala Lumpur in 1961 in limited print runs of 2,000 copies, The Lacquer Screen followed in 1962.
