= The Chinese Maze Murders =

Novel written by Robert van Gulik

- First published edition (Japanese)
- Author: Robert van Gulik
- Series: Judge Dee
- Genre: Gong'an fiction, Mystery, Detective novel, Crime, Historical mystery
- Publisher: Kodansha (Japanese); Nanyang Press (Chinese); W Van Hoeve Ltd (English)
- Publication date: 1951 (Japanese); 1953 (Chinese)
- English publication date: 1956
- Media type: Print
- Followed by: The Chinese Bell Murders

The Chinese Maze Murders is a gong'an historical mystery novel written by Robert van Gulik and set in Imperial China. It is a fiction based on the real character of Judge Dee (Ti Jen-chieh or Di Renjie - chin: 狄仁傑), a magistrate and statesman of the Tang court, who lived roughly 630–700. However, van Gulik's novel is set not in the Tang, but in the Ming dynasty (1368–1644), with society and customs depicted in the book reflecting this period.

This was the first of the fictional mystery stories written by Robert van Gulik. It was based on three actual cases from Chinese criminal investigations. The author, having written the story in English, had it translated by a Japanese friend (Professor Ogaeri Yukio) into Japanese and it was sold in Japan under the title "Meiro-no-satsujin" in 1951. Then the author translated the book into Chinese himself and it was published by the Nanyang Press in Singapore in 1953. Finally Van Gulik published the English-language version in 1956.

The three mysteries: "The Case of the Sealed Room", "The Case of the Hidden Testament", and "The Case of the Girl with the Severed Head" are all based on actual Chinese murder casebooks. The book contains a postscript by the author on the Chinese Imperial Justice system (something that Van Gulik was an expert on).

== Plot introduction ==
Judge Dee is the magistrate in the fictional border town of Lan-fang. Upon arriving he has to depose a local tyrant under whom the previous magistrates were but figurehead puppets. Then he confronts three mysteries involving poisoned plums, a mysterious scroll picture, passionate love letters, a hidden murder, and a ruthless robber. These are all somehow linked to the Governor's garden maze. In addition, there is the growing threat of a Mongol invasion.

Lan-fang was the setting for another Judge Dee novel, The Phantom of the Temple and two short stories from Judge Dee at Work.
