= Khigh Dhiegh =

American actor (1910–1991)

- Dhiegh in Hawaii Five-O, 1975
- Born: Kenneth G. Dickerson; August 25, 1916; Spring Lake, New Jersey, U.S.
- Died: October 25, 1991 (aged 75); Mesa, Arizona, U.S.
- Occupations: Actor, author, recording artist
- Years active: 1950–1990
- Spouse: Mary K. (nee Pearman) Dickerson (1911-1987)
- Children: Kenneth Dickerson (1935-2011), Kathleen Dickerson (1936-2015)
- Parent(s): Nathaniel Beverley Dickerson, Capitola Adelaide Pryor

Khigh Alx Dhiegh (/ˈkaɪ ˈdiː/ KY DEE or /ˈdeɪ/ DAY; born Kenneth G. Dickerson; August 25, 1916 – October 25, 1991) was an American television and motion picture actor of Anglo-Egyptian Sudanese ancestry, noted for portraying East Asian roles. He is perhaps best remembered for portraying villains, in particular his recurring TV guest role as Chinese agent Wo Fat on Hawaii Five-O (from the pilot in 1968, to the final episode in 1980), and brainwashing expert Dr. Yen Lo in 1962's The Manchurian Candidate. (Note: Dr. Lo proudly asserted that the subject's minds were not only "brain-washed", but they were also "dry-cleaned".)

== Life and death ==
He was born Kenneth G. Dickerson in Spring Lake, New Jersey. Dhiegh stated his mother was "Spanish, English, Egyptian, and Chinese" and his father was "Portuguese, Italian, and South African Zulu"; he was raised in New York City, living in all the boroughs except Staten Island. He moved to Arizona in 1977.

Dhiegh petitioned to change his name October 16, 1962 with the change becoming effective November 25, 1962, when Dhiegh was 46 years old. His date of birth also appeared in the Legal Notice.

Dhiegh died on October 25, 1991, at Desert Samaritan Hospital of Mesa, Arizona, from kidney and heart failure.

== Career ==
In the early 1930s, Dhiegh was asked by a customer at his mother's bookshop to understudy the role of a butler in Noël Coward's Design for Living, which led to his long career in acting, producing, and directing.

=== Performance ===
On Broadway, Dhiegh's credits include The Teahouse of the August Moon and Flower Drum Song. Off-Broadway, he received an Obie Award in 1961, for playing Schlink in In the Jungle of Cities.

He also starred in the short-lived 1975 TV series Khan! as the title character. In 1988, he was featured as Four Finger Wu in James Clavell's Noble House television mini-series.

In 1965, Dhiegh recorded and released an album on Folkways Records, entitled Poems of St. John of the Cross: Volume II, a collection of poems of St. John.

=== Philosophy ===
Besides his acting endeavors, Dhiegh was active in Taoist philosophy, writing a number of books on the subject, including The Eleventh Wing (ISBN 0-385-28371-7). Dhiegh credited his "life long dear friend Chao-Li Chi" with sparking his interest in the I Ching and Taoism, starting in 1935. In 1971, he founded the Taoist Sanctuary (now the Taoist Institute) in Hollywood, California. At the time, he was living in the San Fernando Valley.

Dhiegh also had a doctorate in theology, and in his later years, was the rector for a Taoist sanctuary in Tempe, Arizona called 'Inner Truth Looking Place.' He held weekly services and sponsored many 'Tea Ceremonies' in the Phoenix metro area. Dhiegh picked up jewelry making as a hobby in the 1970s, later selling pieces to help support the sanctuary. One of his last interviews was on One World in 1990, where he presented the concept of World Citizenry and its benefit to mankind. Dhiegh's contributions to Taoism are discussed in some detail in the book Taoism for Dummies (John Wiley and Sons Canada, 2013).

=== Select filmography ===
Year	Title	Role	Notes
1957	Time Limit	Col. Kim	as Kaie Deei
1962	The Manchurian Candidate	Dr. Yen Lo	
1963	13 Frightened Girls	Kang	
1965	How to Murder Your Wife	Bald Actor playing Thug	
1966	Seconds	Davalo	
1968	The Destructors	King Chou Lai	
1968-1980	Hawaii Five-O	Wo Fat	15 episodes
1969	Mission: Impossible	General Wo	Episode: "Doomsday"
1970	Mission: Impossible	Toshio Masaki	Episode: "Butterfly"
1970	The Hawaiians	Kai Chung	
1971	The Mephisto Waltz	Zanc Theun	
1974	Judge Dee and The Monastery Murders	Judge Dee	
1978	Goin' Coconuts	Wong	
