= Judge Dee =

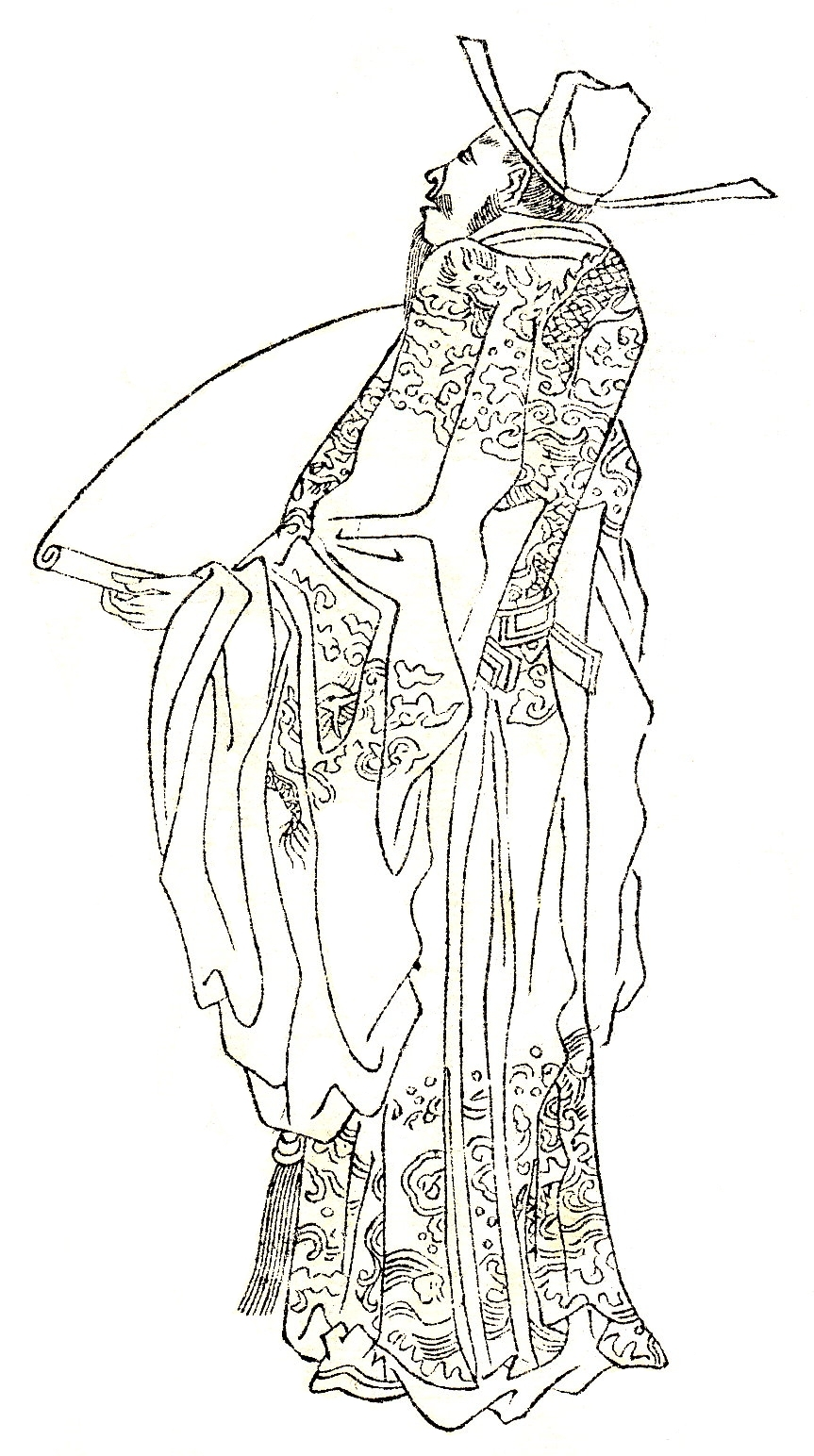
- Judge Dee
- First appearance: Celebrated Cases of Judge Dee
- Last appearance: Poets and Murder
- Created by: Anonymous author credited as "Buti zhuanren"/novel translated and subsequent novels continued by Robert van Gulik
- Based on: Di Renjie
- Portrayed by: Michael Goodliffe; Khigh Dhiegh; Yiwei Zhou

In-universe information
- Gender: Male
- Occupation: Magistrate
- Nationality: Chinese

Judge Dee (狄公), or Judge Di, is a semi-fictional character based on the historical figure Di Renjie, county magistrate and statesman of the Tang court. The character appeared in the 18th-century Chinese detective and gong'an crime novel Di Gong An. After Robert van Gulik came across it in an antiquarian book store in Tokyo, he translated the novel into English and then used the style and characters to write his own original Judge Dee historical mystery stories.

The series is set in Tang dynasty China and deals with criminal cases solved by the upright and shrewd Judge Dee, who as county magistrate in the Chinese imperial legal system was both the investigating magistrate and judge.

== Di Gong An ==
The Judge Dee character is based on the historical figure Di Renjie (c. 630 – c. 700), magistrate and statesman of the Tang court. During the Ming dynasty (1368–1644) in China, a "folk novel" was written set in former times, but filled with anachronisms.

Van Gulik found a copy of the 18th-century Di Gong An novel (Chinese: 狄公案; pinyin: Dí Gōng Àn; lit. "Cases of Judge Dee") in a Tokyo book store. It's an original tale dealing with three cases simultaneously. For the most part the overbearing supernatural plot elements, common among Chinese mystery tales of that period, were lacking in this case, making the story more accessible to Western readers. He translated it into English and had it published in 1949 under the title Celebrated Cases of Judge Dee.

== Van Gulik's stories ==
Van Gulik began writing his own novels with the character, eventually authoring sixteen books. Van Gulik was careful in writing the main novels to deal with cases wherein Dee was newly appointed to a city, thereby isolating him from the existing lifestyle and enabling him to maintain an objective role in the books. Van Gulik's novels and stories are often referred to as the Shih Ti.

Dee is initially assisted only by his faithful clerk, Sergeant Hoong Liang, an old family retainer. In The Chinese Gold Murders, which describes Dee's initial appointment and first criminal cases, the judge encounters two highwaymen, euphemistically called "men of the green woods", Ma Joong and Chiao Tai, who attempt to rob him but are so impressed with his character that they give up their criminal careers and join his retinue on the spot. This encounter is recounted in a short flashback passage in the original Di Gong An, taking place when the two are already long-serving loyal members of his retinue. A little later, in The Chinese Lake Murders, an itinerant confidence trickster and swindler, Tao Gan, similarly joins. Judge Dee ends his career in Murder in Canton being promoted to the position of senior Metropolitan Judge in the capital, and his assistants obtain official ranks in the Army and civil service.

Van Gulik also wrote a series of newspaper comics about Judge Dee in 1964–1967, which totalled 19 adventures. The first four were regular balloon strips, but the later 15 had the more typically Dutch textblock under the pictures.

Judge Dee is responsible for deciding sentences as well as assessing guilt or innocence, although van Gulik notes in the stories that all capital punishments must be referred to and confirmed by officials in the capital. One of the sentences he frequently has to deal with is slow slicing; if he is inclined to mercy, he orders the final, fatal, cut to be made first, thus rendering the ceremony anticlimactic.

Van Gulik's Judge Dee novels have been translated into Chinese.

== Other authors ==
Several other authors have created stories based on Van Gulik's Judge Dee character:

- French author Frédéric Lenormand wrote 19 new Judge Dee mysteries from year 2004 at Editions Fayard, Paris (not yet translated into English). Some of them have been translated into Spanish (Ediciones Paidos Iberica), Portuguese (Europress), Bulgarian (Paradox), Czech (Garamond) and Polish.
- Sven Roussel, another French author, has written La dernière enquête du Juge Ti.
- The Chinese-American author Zhu Xiao Di wrote ten original short stories about Judge Dee collected in Tales of Judge Dee (2006), set when the Judge was the magistrate of Poo-yang (the same time period as The Chinese Bell Murders and several other novels). Zhu Xiao Di has no relation to Robert van Gulik but tried to stay faithful to the fictionalized history of van Gulik's Judge Dee.
- Judge Dee appears, along with a fictionalized Wu Zetian, in books one (Iron Empress: A Novel of Mystery and Madness in Ancient China) and two (Shore of Pearls: A Novel of Murder, Plague, and the Prison Island of Hainan) of Eleanor Cooney & Daniel Alteri's historical T'ang Trilogy.
- Qiu Xiaolong, best known for his Inspector Chen series, released a new Judge Dee novel The Shadow of the Empire in 2021, followed by The Conspiracies of the Empire in 2024.

== Bibliography ==
=== By van Gulik ===
The following novels and short stories were published in English by van Gulik. The short story collection Judge Dee at Work (published in 1967) contains a "Judge Dee Chronology" detailing Dee's various posts in specific years and stories set in these times. Van Gulik's last two books, Poets and Murder and Necklace and Calabash, were not listed in the chronology, as they were written after Judge Dee at Work, but they are both set in the time when Judge Dee was the magistrate in Poo-yang.

Year	Title	Setting	Notes
1949	Celebrated Cases of Judge Dee	An "early phase of Judge Dee's career".	Translated from Chinese (originally, Dee Goong An); not part of the later continuity. Three stories: "The Case of the Double Murder at Dawn", "The Case of the Strange Corpse", and "The Case of the Poisoned Bride". Dee is the newly appointed Magistrate of Chang-ping in the Province of Shantung. He has all four lieutenants on staff: Sgt. Hoong, Chiao Tai, Ma Joong, and Tao Gan.
1957	The Chinese Maze Murders	670, Lan-fang	Written in 1950, published in Japanese in 1951; Lan-fang is a fictional district at the western frontier of Tang China.
1958	The Chinese Bell Murders	668, Poo-yang	Written between 1953 and 1956; Poo-yang is a fictional wealthy district on the shores of the Grand Canal of China (part of modern-day Jiangsu province).
1959	The Chinese Gold Murders	663, Penglai	Dee's initial appointment and first criminal cases, the judge encounters two highwaymen, euphemistically called "men of the greenwood", Ma Joong and Chiao Tai.
1960	The Chinese Lake Murders	666, Han-yuan	Han-yuan is a fictional district on a lakeshore near the capital of Chang-An. Huan-Yuan (韩原) is an ancient name for the modern day Hancheng city in Shaanxi province.
1961	The Chinese Nail Murders	676, Pei-chow	Pei-chow is a fictional district in the far north of Tang China.
1961	The Haunted Monastery	667, Han-yuan	Judge Dee is traveling and forced to take shelter in a monastery.
1961	The Red Pavilion	668, Poo-yang	Judge Dee is drawn into a web of lies and sad stories in the world of the prostitutes of Imperial China.
1962	The Lacquer Screen	664, Penglai	Judge Dee and Chiao Tai disguise themselves to go undercover and join a gang of robbers to solve the case.
1963	The Emperor's Pearl	669, Poo-yang	Odd things going on at the deserted villa, an apparently cursed Imperial Treasure and a perverted madman.
1965	The Morning of the Monkey	667, Han-yuan	A short novel from The Monkey and the Tiger.
1965	The Night of the Tiger	676, Pei-chow	A short novel from The Monkey and the Tiger.
1965	The Willow Pattern	677, Chang-An	Judge Dee is the Lord Chief Justice in the Imperial capital of Chang-An.
1966	Murder in Canton	681, Guangzhou	Judge Dee is the Lord Chief Justice for all of China.
1966	The Phantom of the Temple	670, Lan-fang	Mysterious phantom haunting a Buddhist temple. 20 bars of gold missing, and the merchant's beautiful daughter.
1967	"Five Auspicious Clouds"	663, Penglai	A short story from Judge Dee at Work.
1967	"The Red Tape Murders"	663, Penglai	A short story from Judge Dee at Work. Military murder at the army fortress.
1967	"He Came With the Rain"	663, Penglai	A short story from Judge Dee at Work.
1967	"The Murder on the Lotus Pond"	666, Han-yuan	A short story from Judge Dee at Work.
1967	"The Two Beggars"	668, Poo-yang	A short story from Judge Dee at Work.
1967	"The Wrong Sword"	668, Poo-yang	A short story from Judge Dee at Work.
1967	"The Coffins of the Emperor"	670, Lan-fang	A short story from Judge Dee at Work.
1967	"Murder on New Year's Eve"	670, Lan-fang	A short story from Judge Dee at Work.
1967	Necklace and Calabash	668, Poo-yang	Judge Dee is a magistrate in the fictional Poo-yang district. Last Judge Dee novel published during van Gulik's lifetime.
1968	Poets and Murder	669, Poo-yang	During a festival in Chin-hwa, Judge Dee is a guest of a group of distinguished scholars. A young girl has been murdered and the accused is a beautiful poetess.

=== By other authors ===
By the author Frédéric Lenormand (not yet translated into English):

- Le Château du lac Tchou-an (2004) - The Zhou-an lake castle
- La Nuit des juges (2004) - The Night of the judges
- Petits meurtres entre moines (2004) - Little murders among monks
- Le Palais des courtisanes (2004) - The courtesans' palace
- Madame Ti mène l'enquête (2005) - Mrs. Dee investigates
- Mort d'un cuisinier chinois (2005) - Death of a Chinese cook
- L'Art délicat du deuil (2006) - The Delicate art of mourning
- Mort d'un maître de go (2006) - Death of a Go master
- Dix petits démons chinois (2007) - Ten little Chinese devils
- Médecine chinoise à l'usage des assassins (2007) - Chinese Medicine for murderers
- Guide de survie d'un juge en Chine (2008) - Survival guide for the Chinese judge
- Panique sur la Grande Muraille (2008) - Panic on the Great Wall
- Le Mystère du jardin chinois (2009) - The Chinese Garden Mystery
- Diplomatie en kimono (2009) - Diplomacy in a Kimono
- Thé vert et arsenic (2010) - Arsenic and green tea
- Un Chinois ne ment jamais (2010) - A Chinese never lies
- Divorce à la chinoise (2011) - Chinese-style Divorce
- Meurtres sur le fleuve Jaune (2011) - The Yellow River Murders

By the author Zhu Xiao Di:

- Tales of Judge Dee (2006), ten short stories set in the time when Judge Dee is magistrate of Poo-yang (AD 669–670), ISBN 0-595-38438-2

By the author Sven Roussel:

- La Dernière Enquète du Juge Ti (2008) set at the end Judge Dee's term of service in Lan Fang (AD 675)

By authors Eleanor Cooney & Daniel Alteri:

- Iron Empress: A Novel of Mystery and Madness in Ancient China (formerly titled Deception: A Novel of Mystery and Madness in Ancient China, ISBN 0-380-70872-8), Book One of the T'ang Trilogy, ISBN 9781475604450
- Shore of Pearls: A Novel of Murder, Plague, and the Prison Island of Hainan, Book Two of the T'ang Trilogy, ISBN 9781475604474

By Lin Qianyu (林千羽):

- 狄仁杰 通天帝国 (2010), tie-in novel of Tsui Hark 2010 film: Detective Dee and the Mystery of the Phantom Flame, ISBN 978-7-5385-4859-4

By the author Hock G. Tjoa:

- The Ingenious Judge Dee (2013), a theatrical play based on Dee Goong An, ISBN 1-493-57691-7

By Qiu Xiaolong:

- In the Shadow of the Empire (2021), ISBN 978-07-2785-081-2

== Adaptations ==
=== Comics ===
The stories have been adapted into comic strips by Dutch artists Frits Kloezeman between 1964 and 1969 and Dick Matena in 2000.

=== Television ===
==== English-language ====
Judge Dee has been adapted for television twice in English:

- In 1969, Howard Baker produced six Judge Dee stories for Granada Television. These episodes were in black and white and were not a ratings success. White English actor Michael Goodliffe portrayed the Judge in yellowface.
- In 1974, Nicholas Meyer adapted the novel The Haunted Monastery into a television movie for ABC titled Judge Dee and the Monastery Murders, directed by Jeremy Kagan and starring Khigh Dhiegh as Judge Dee. With the exception of the star (who generally played East Asian roles but was of English and North African descent), the movie had an all-Asian cast, including Mako, Soon-Tek Oh, Keye Luke, Irene Tsu, Yuki Shimoda and James Hong. It was nominated for an Edgar Award for Best Television Feature or Miniseries in 1975.

==== Chinese-language ====
Some of Robert van Gulik's Judge Dee stories have been adapted for Chinese TV by CCTV, under the title of Detective Di Renjie, most of which star Liang Guanhua as Detective Di. As of 2012, four different DVD series are available with one series so far with English subtitles. CCTV produced series in 2004, 2006, 2008 and 2010. The series from 2010, entitled "Detective Di Renjie" has been produced on DVD by Tai Seng entertainment with English subtitles.

The list:

- Amazing Detective Di Renjie (2004)
- Amazing Detective Di Renjie 2 (2006)
- Amazing Detective Di Renjie 3 (2008)
- Mad Detective Di Renjie (2010)

In 2013, Beijing-based producer Wang Donghui secured the rights to make a new 40-episode TV series adaptation of the novels. It was a UK-China co-production, overseen by Western showrunners Jim Keeble and Dudi Appleton, with a British writing team. The scripts were then translated into Chinese. It stars Yiwei Zhou as Di Renjie. In 2024, Youku released the series, titled Judge Dee's Mystery, which was also sold to Netflix.

=== Film ===
Tsui Hark has made a trilogy of films based on the character. Andy Lau portrayed the character in the first film with Mark Chao continuing in the next two.

- Detective Dee and the Mystery of the Phantom Flame (2010)
- Young Detective Dee: Rise of the Sea Dragon (2013)
- Detective Dee: The Four Heavenly Kings (2018)
- The Mystery of Humanoid Puppet (2024)

=== Video Games ===
Judge Dee is the protagonist of the title Detective Di: The Silk Rose Murders (2019.

== See also ==
- Early Chinese detective fiction
