= The Wish Machine =

1979 screenplay by Arkady and Boris Strugatsky

The Wish Machine (Russian: Маши́на жела́ний, Mashína zhelániy, literally "Machine of wishes"), also called Stalker, is a screenplay by Arkady and Boris Strugatsky for the 1979 movie Stalker that in turn is based on the fourth chapter of their 1972 novel Roadside Picnic, published in Avrora issues 7–9.

Tarkovsky's volunteer secretary Marianna Chugunova claimed that in total 12 or 13 variants of the screenplay were considered.

Two versions of the story were published: an early draft, printed by Text Publishers; and a later version published in issue 25 of Сборник научной фантастики (1981), which was also translated and published abroad:

- In French: Stalker. Pique-nique au bord du chemin (1981) by Svetlana Delmotte
- In Polish: Maszyna życzeń, by Paweł Porwit in: Kwazar 01 (13) 1983
- In Hungarian: Stalker (1984) by Iván Földeák
- In Swedish: Stalker (1987) by Kjell Rehnström and Sam J. Lundwall
