= Celebrated Cases of Judge Dee =

19th-century Chinese gong'an detective novel

- Chapter one of an edition of the novel that was printed in the 28th year of the Guangxu Emperor.
- Author: Unknown
- Original title: Di Gong An
- Translator: Robert van Gulik
- Language: Chinese
- Series: Judge Dee
- Genre: Gong'an fiction, Mystery, Detective novel, Crime
- Publication date: 19th century
- Publication place: China
- English publication date: 1949
- Media type: Print (hardback & paperback)
- Pages: 237 (English)

Celebrated Cases of Judge Dee (Chinese: 狄公案; pinyin: Dí Gōng Àn; lit. "Cases of Judge Dee"), also known as Di Gong An or Dee Goong An, is a 19th-century Chinese gong'an detective novel by an anonymous author, "Buti zhuanren" (Chinese: 不题撰人). It is loosely based on the stories of Di Renjie (Wade-Giles Ti Jen-chieh), a county magistrate and statesman of the Tang court, who lived roughly 630–700. Though set in Tang dynasty China, the novel also contains cultural elements from later dynasties. A translated version was released by Robert van Gulik in 1949; van Gulik would go on to write his own series of Judge Dee novels, starting with The Chinese Maze Murders.

== Translation ==
Cover of the first edition translation by Robert van Gulik.

The Dutch sinologist and diplomat Robert van Gulik came across a copy in a second-hand book store in Tokyo and translated the novel into English. He then used it as the basis to create his own original Judge Dee stories over the next 20 years. Van Gulik wrote:

This translation is chiefly a product of the Pacific War years, 1941-1945, when constant travel on various war duties made other more complicated Sinological research impossible.

This novel Dee Goong An is offered here in a complete translation. Possibly it would have had a wider appeal if it had been entirely re-written in a form more familiar to our readers.

The translation was first privately printed on behalf of Van Gulik by the Toppan Printing Company of Tokyo, in a limited run of 1200 numbered signed copies.

The translation features nine drawings, three copies from old Chinese art, and six illustrations by the author.

=== "Four Great Strange Cases of Empress Wu's Reign" ===
As carefully noted in his scholarly postscript, the present book is in fact a translation of only about half (31 out of 65 chapters) of a Chinese book in Van Gulik's possession, entitled "Four Great Strange Cases of Empress Wu's Reign". Van Gulik obtained three editions of that book – a 19th-century manuscript and two printed editions, published respectively in 1903 and in 1947 at Shanghai. There were many differences between variant texts, Van Gulik considering the 19th century version the best and basing his translation mainly on it.

The part which Van Gulik translated describes Judge Dee simultaneously solving three difficult criminal cases, culminating with his being rewarded by promotion to the Imperial court (which, Van Gulik notes, was the traditional culmination of a Chinese story about an official). The later 34 chapters described events at the Court (where the historical Judge Dee is known to have been a valued adviser to Empress Wu, though his career suffered various ups and downs).

Based on textual analysis, Van Gulik became convinced that the second part was a later addition written by "a person of feeble talents". As stated in the postscript, "Part I is written in a fairly compact style and cleverly composed. The style of part II, on the contrary, is prolix and repetitious, the plot is clumsy and the characters badly drawn. Further, while Part I is written with considerable restraint, in part II there occur passages which are plain pornography, e.g. where the relations of the Empress Wu with the priest Huai-i are described". Moreover, Part II did not describe a detective investigation at all, but rather dealt mainly with court intrigues and power struggles - and thus did not serve Van Gulik's aim of presenting Chinese crime fiction to Western readers.

For all these reasons Van Gulik decided to translate the first part only. The title given, "Celebrated Cases of Judge Dee", is what Van Gulik assumed the original work was called, before the second part was added. However, he never actually obtained a copy of that original work or a conclusive evidence that it had existed under that name. The second part, of which Van Gulik so strongly disapproved, was apparently never translated - leaving western readers with no way of independently evaluating Van Gulik's scathing criticism.

== Plot introduction ==
There are three cases in this book. The first might be called "The Double Murder at Dawn"; the case describes the hazardous life of the traveling silk merchant and a murder which is committed to gain wealth.

The second, "The Strange Corpse", takes place in a small village and addresses a crime of passion which proves hard to solve. The criminal is a very determined woman.

The third case, "The Poisoned Bride", addresses the poisoning of a local scholar's daughter, who marries the son of the former administrator of the district and dies mysteriously on her wedding night. This case contains a surprising twist in its solution.

All three cases are solved by Judge Dee, the district magistrate, detective, prosecutor, judge, and jury all wrapped up into one person. His powers are vast, and some of the things he can do would be manifestly illegal in a Western judicial system - such as grossly intimidating a witness or suspect, up to and including the extraction of a confession by torture. In contrast, making a false judgement could be far more perilous to a magistrate like Dee than to a modern western judge. Exhuming a dead body without proving the dead person was murdered would be an act of sacrilege which would cost the Judge his job (which very nearly happens to Dee in the course of the book). If a magistrate sentenced a person to death and the executed was afterwards proved to have been innocent, the magistrate would be himself executed - having made an honest mistake would not be sufficient to save him. Should an innocent person die under torture, both the judge ordering the torture and all members of staff administering the torture would suffer capital punishment - and members of Dee's staff urging him to cease torture when the suspect proves obdurate shows they are aware of that dire risk to themselves.

The three cases offer a glimpse into the lives of different classes in traditional Chinese society: adventurous traders who travel vast distances along the trade routes up and down the land of China, and who are sometimes targeted by robbers and sometimes form dubious partnerships or turn outright robbers themselves; the small-scale shopkeepers and townspeople, who live within a narrow circumscribed life of routine which some find stifling; the gentry of literati, who by long tradition were considered as the land's rulers and so considered themselves.

Any official departure of Judge Dee from the court compound (which also includes his private living quarters) is done with fanfare, accompanied by a large retinue of constables and officials. This approach is sometimes useful - especially when suspects are to be overawed and intimidated, or recalcitrant local officials intimidated into fully cooperating with an investigation. Sometimes, however, Judge Dee finds it expedient to go out incognito and carry out an investigation in disguise. He carries off very well the disguise of an itinerant physician; as Van Gulik points out, knowledge of medicine was expected of Chinese literati. Conversely, Judge Dee is less successful in passing himself off as a merchant, a member of a completely different social class; an observant merchant quickly unmasks him as what he is, a member of the Literati elite. Fortunately, it turns out that this observant merchant is not the wanted criminal; on the contrary, he is an honest merchant, with his own accounts to settle with the criminal, and becomes a very valuable ally.

Judge Dee acts according to very strict ethics, regarding himself as duty bound to enforce justice, seek out, and severely punish all wrong-doers, high or low. Some remarks made by various characters and references made to other magistrates make clear that Dee's conduct is far from universal among District Judges. Others of Dee's colleagues might have been more lenient with a suspected murderer when he was a member of a rich family and an outstanding student of literature; or would not have exerted themselves to catch the murderer of a "small" shop-keeper in a minor provincial town; or would have thought more of lining their own pockets than of seeing justice done. Judge Dee's honesty and probity were proverbial - which is why tales were told of him even more than a thousand years after his death.

== Literary significance and criticism ==
The scholars Jacques Barzun and Wendell Hertig Taylor wrote in their review of detective fiction that "Dee Goong An is the genuine article, dating from the 18th century and barely modified by the translator to make it intelligible today. Like his modern fictions, it adroitly intertwines three plots and shows the judge and his aides in their now familiar guise. The introduction and notes (including Chinese ideograms for the skeptical) are as entertaining as the tale, once the reader has become a Dee-votee".

== See also ==
- Bao Gong An
- Detective fiction
- Early Chinese detective fiction
