= Judge Dee at Work =

1967 collection of short stories by Robert van Gulik

- First edition
- Author: Robert van Gulik
- Series: Judge Dee
- Genre: Gong'an fiction, Mystery, Detective novel, Crime
- Published: Heinemann
- Publication date: 1967
- Media type: Print
- Pages: 174
- Preceded by: The Phantom of the Temple
- Followed by: Necklace and Calabash

Judge Dee at Work is a collection of 8 gong'an detective short stories written by Robert van Gulik and set in Imperial China (roughly speaking the Tang dynasty). It is a fiction based on the real character of Judge Dee (Ti Jen-chieh or Di Renjie), a county magistrate and statesman of the Tang court, who lived roughly 630–700.

The book features eight illustrations by the author.

The book also has a postscript where the author places all the novels and stories into a coherent timeline for his semi-fictional character.

== Overview ==
Judge Dee, a magistrate in Imperial China is a crime solver, a detective. In these stories Judge Dee solves a series of un-related crimes from different times in his career. There is no over-all narrative to these stories.

== List of stories ==
1. "Five Auspicious Clouds" - set in the year 663 when Judge Dee was a magistrate of Peng-lai.
2. "The Red Tape Murder" - set in the year 663 when Judge Dee was a magistrate of Peng-lai.
3. "He Came With the Rain" - set in the year 663 was a magistrate of Peng-lai.
4. "The Murder on the Lotus Pond" - set in the year 666 when Judge Dee was a magistrate of Han-yuan.
5. "The Two Beggars" - set in the year 668 when Judge Dee was a magistrate of Poo-yang.
6. "The Wrong Sword" - set in the year 668 when Judge Dee was a magistrate of Poo-yang.
7. "The Coffins of the Emperor" - set in the year 670 when Judge Dee was a magistrate of Lan-fang.
8. "Murder on New Year's Eve" - set in the year 670 when Judge Dee was a magistrate of Lan-fang.
