= Robert van Gulik =

Dutch orientalist, diplomat and writer (1910–1967)

- Robert van Gulik with a baby gibbon Bubu
- Born: Robert Hans van Gulik; August 9, 1910; Zutphen, Netherlands
- Died: 24 September 1967 (aged 57); The Hague, Netherlands
- Education: Leiden University (BA); Utrecht University (MA, PhD)
- Spouse: Shui Shifang (m. 1943)
- Children: Willem, Pieter, Pauline, Thomas

Signature
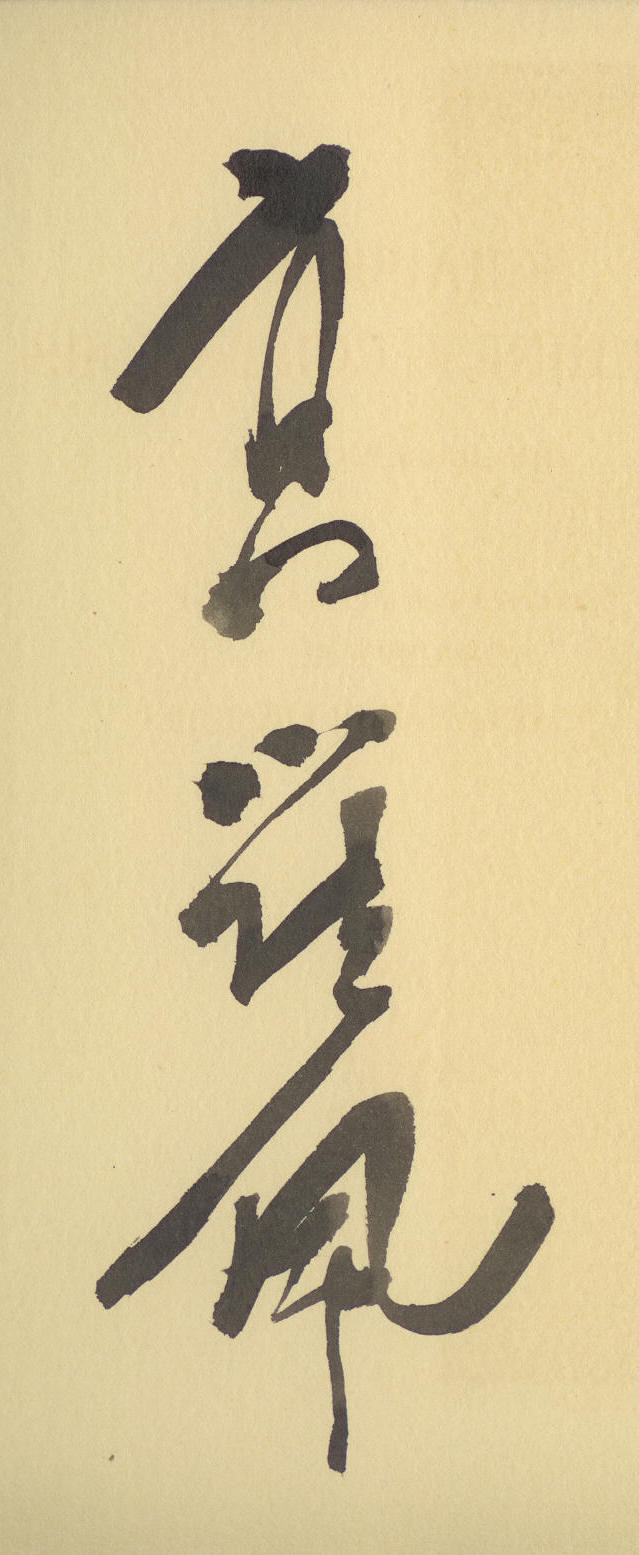

Robert Hans van Gulik (Chinese: 髙羅佩; pinyin: Gāo Luópèi, 9 August 1910 – 24 September 1967) was a Dutch orientalist, diplomat, musician (of the guqin), and writer, best known for the Judge Dee historical mysteries, the protagonist of which he borrowed from the 18th-century Chinese detective novel Dee Goong An.

== Life ==
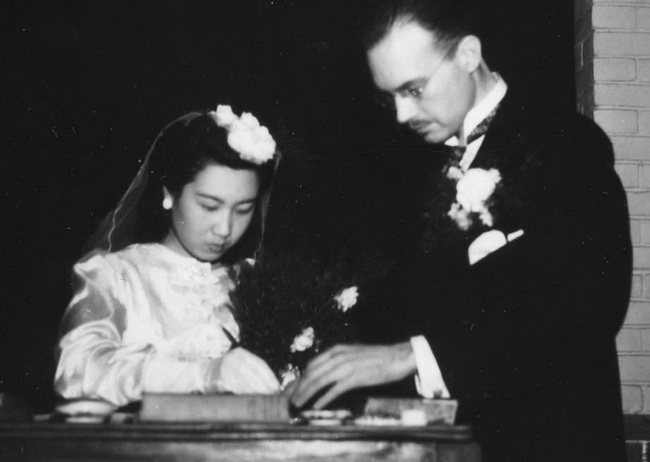
Marrying Shui Shifang (Chongqing, 1943)

Robert van Gulik was born in Zutphen, the son of a medical officer in the Dutch army of what was then called the Dutch East Indies (modern-day Indonesia). He was born in the Netherlands, but from the age of three till twelve he lived in Batavia, Dutch East Indies (now Jakarta), where he was tutored in Mandarin and other languages.

After performing his secondary education at the Gymnasium in Nijmegen (1923–1929), he went to Leiden University in 1929 where he pursued Chinese studies, with Japanese studies as a minor. He began his studies under the sinologist J.J.L. Duyvendak, whose interests were in Ancient China. He eventually graduated in Leiden with a BA degree (kandidaatsexamen) in Dutch East Indies Law in 1932. Perhaps because of his upbringing in the East Indies, Van Gulik's interests were in later periods, and he transferred to the Utrecht University where he subsequently obtained an MA degree in Chinese and Japanese languages in 1933 and a PhD in sinology in 1935, both cum laude.

His talents as a linguist suited him for a job in the Dutch Foreign Service, which he joined in 1935; and he was then stationed in various countries, mostly in East Asia (Japan and China). He was in Tokyo when Japan declared war on the Netherlands in 1941, but he, along with the rest of the Allied diplomatic staff, were evacuated in 1942. He spent most of the rest of World War II as the secretary for the Dutch mission to Chiang Kai-shek's Nationalist government in Chongqing. While he worked as a secretary for the Dutch mission in Chongqing in 1943, he married a Chinese woman, Shui Shifang (Chinese: 水世芳) (1912–2005), the daughter of a Qing dynasty Imperial mandarin. They would later had four children together. There he freely mingled with prominent figures in traditional and modern Chinese culture, though he had little interest in China's modernization and the intellectual changes since the New Culture Movement.

Van Gulik was an accomplished calligrapher. His work is known in China under the name Kao Lo-p'ei (Chinese: 髙羅佩; pinyin: Gāo Luópèi).

After the war ended, he returned to the Netherlands, then went to the United States as the counsellor of the Dutch Embassy in Washington, D.C. He returned to Japan in 1949 and stayed there for the next four years. While in Tokyo, he published his first two books, the translation Celebrated Cases of Judge Dee and a privately published book of erotic colored prints from the Ming dynasty. Later postings took him all over the world, from New Delhi, Kuala Lumpur, and Beirut (during the 1958 Civil War) to The Hague. In 1959 Van Gulik became correspondent of the Royal Netherlands Academy of Arts and Sciences; he resigned in 1963. In 1964 he became a full member, and the next year he became a foreign member. From 1965 until his death from cancer at The Hague in 1967, he was the Dutch ambassador to Japan.

== Judge Dee mysteries ==
During World War II van Gulik translated the 18th-century detective novel Dee Goong An into English under the title Celebrated Cases of Judge Dee (first published in Tokyo in 1949). The main character of this book, Judge Dee, was based on the real statesman and detective Di Renjie, who lived in the 7th century, during the Tang dynasty (AD 618–907), though in the novel itself elements of Ming dynasty China (AD 1368–1644) were mixed in.

Thanks to his translation of this largely forgotten work, van Gulik became interested in Chinese detective fiction. To the translation he appended an essay on the genre in which he suggested that it was easy to imagine rewriting some of the old Chinese case histories with an eye toward modern readers. Not long afterward he himself tried his hand at creating a detective story along these lines. This became the book The Chinese Maze Murders (completed around 1950). As van Gulik thought the story would have more interest to Japanese and Chinese readers, he had it translated into Japanese by a friend (finished in 1951), and it was sold in Japan under the title Meiro-no-satsujin. With the success of the book, van Gulik produced a translation into Chinese, which was published by a Singapore book publisher in 1953. The reviews were good, and van Gulik wrote two more books (The Chinese Bell Murders and The Chinese Lake Murders) over the next few years, also with an eye toward Japanese and then Chinese editions. Next, van Gulik found a publisher for English versions of the stories, and the first such version was published in 1957. Later books were written and published in English first; the translations came afterwards.

Van Gulik's intent in writing his first Judge Dee novel was, as he wrote in remarks on The Chinese Bell Murders, "to show modern Chinese and Japanese writers that their own ancient crime-literature has plenty of source material for detective and mystery-stories". In 1956, he published a translation of the T'ang-yin-pi-shih ("Parallel Cases from Under the Pear Tree"), a 13th-century casebook for district magistrates. He used many of the cases as plots in his novels (as he states in the postscripts of the novels).

Van Gulik's Judge Dee mysteries follow in the long tradition of Chinese detective fiction, intentionally preserving a number of key elements of that writing culture. Most notably, he had Judge Dee solve three different (and sometimes unrelated) cases in each book, a traditional device in Chinese mysteries. The whodunit element is also less important in the Judge Dee stories than it is in the traditional Western detective story, though still more so than in traditional Chinese detective stories. Nevertheless, van Gulik's fiction was adapted to a more Western audience, avoiding the supernatural and religious traditions of Buddhism and Daoism in favour of rationality.

Friends and even his daughter, Pauline, said that he identified with Judge Dee. He lived the life of a mandarin who cultivated calligraphy, poems and paintings. When he started writing the stories in 1949, he was in a conservative and nostalgic mood, remarking "Judge Dee, it's me".

== Other works ==
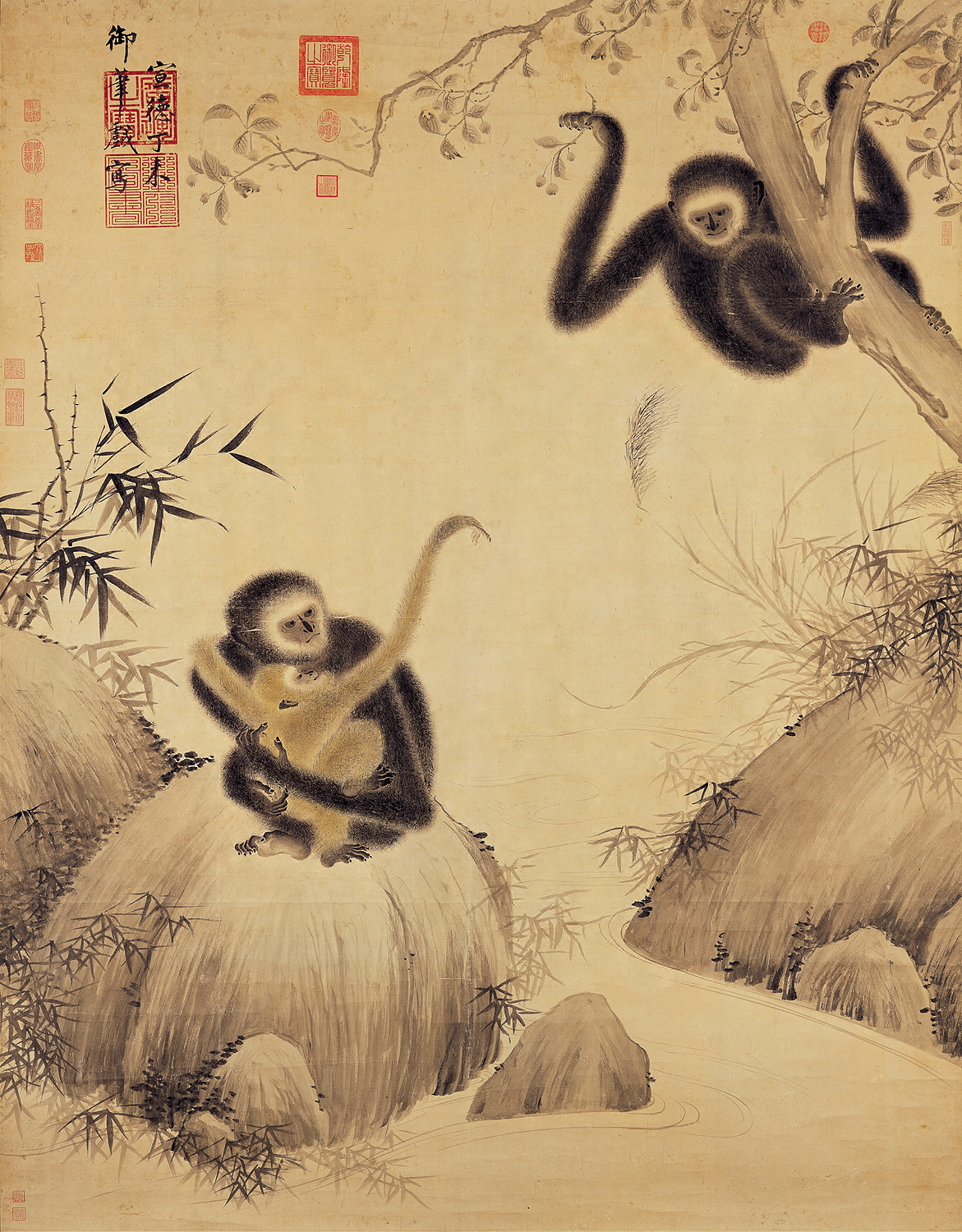
"Gibbons at play", painting by the Xuande Emperor (1427)

Robert van Gulik studied Indisch Recht (Dutch Indies law) and Indologie (Indonesian culture) at Leiden University from 1929 until 1934, receiving his doctorate for a dissertation on the horse cult in Northeast Asia at Utrecht University. Though he made his career in the Dutch diplomatic service, he kept up his studies. During his life he wrote twenty-odd essays and monographs on various subjects, mainly but not exclusively on aspects of Chinese culture. Typically, much of his scholarly work was first published outside the Netherlands. In his lifetime van Gulik was recognized as a European expert on Imperial Chinese jurisprudence.

Van Gulik was interested in Chinese painting. For example, in his book The Gibbon in China (1967), he devotes pages to the gibbon-themed paintings in China and Japan, from the Northern Song dynasty onwards. Analyzing the portrayal of these apes throughout history, he notes how the realism of the pictures deteriorated as the gibbon population in most of China was extirpated. As an art critic, he greatly admired the portrayal of the apes by such renowned painters as Yi Yuanji and Muqi Fachang. Commenting on one of Ming Emperor Xuande's works, "Gibbons at Play", van Gulik says that while it is "not a great work of art", it is "ably executed". The lifelike images of the apes make one surmise that the emperor painted from the live models that could have been kept in the palace gardens.

== Library and personal archive ==
In 1977 part of the library of Robert van Gulik was acquired from the heirs of Van Gulik for the Sinological Institute at Leiden University and transferred in 2016 to Leiden University Libraries. In 2022 and 2023 the personal archive and collection of Robert van Gulik was donated by his heirs to Leiden University Libraries.
