= Chinese crime fiction =

Literary genre

Chinese crime fiction (Chinese: 犯罪小说; pinyin: fànzuì xiǎoshuō) is an umbrella term which generally refers to Sinophone literature concerned with the investigation and punishment of criminal acts. In mainland China the most popular subgenre is "detective fiction" (Chinese: 侦探推理小说; pinyin: zhēntàn tuīlǐ xiǎoshuō; lit. 'detective deduction stories', often abbreviated to 推理小说 tuīlǐ xiǎoshuō or 侦探小说 zhēntàn xiǎoshuō).

== Origins and Brief Timeline ==
In the 1950s, crime fiction was dominated by "legal system literature", which included legal system poetry, crime reportage, and works about civil conflicts. The 1980s saw the rise of the less progressive-sounding public security literature, which marked a shift from the ancient and respected "court case literature."

From 1896, Sherlock Holmes was translated into Chinese. During the 1890s-1920s, European-style detective fiction was popular in China.

Between 1949 and 1977, no work of fiction told of crimes committed by the gentry. Crimes were also not reported by the press as the socialist system was not supposed to foster crime. Sherlockian novels were then characterized as capitalist and low grade, arguing they aroused base passions for sex and violence.

== Mainland China ==
=== Crime Fiction in the Song and Ming Dynasties ===
During the Song and Ming dynasties, crime fictions varied in themes. Gong'an (crime-case) fiction and swindler stories were considered the most popular subgenres. Written in colloquial rather than literary Chinese, they nearly always featured district magistrates or judges in the higher courts.

The gong'an genre was among the new types of vernacular fiction that developed from the Song to the Ming Dynasties. The plots usually begin with a description of the crime (often including realistic detail of contemporary life) and culminated in the exposure of the deed and the punishment of the guilty. Sometimes two solutions to a mystery were posited, but the correct solution is reached through a brilliant judge.

==== Song Dynasty (960–1279) ====
In the Song Dynasty the growth of commerce and urban society created a demand for a new kind of crime fiction–namely gong'an fiction that focused on entertaining the upper and merchant class. One of the most celebrated heroes of such tales was Judge Bao Zheng, or "Dragon Plan Bao," who was originally based on a historical government official. Featured in hundreds of stories, Bao became the archetype of the incorruptible official in a society in which miscarriages of justice in favour of the rich and powerful were all too common. Not all crime stories have happy endings, and some were evidently written with the aim of exposing the brutal methods of corrupt judges who–after accepting bribes–would extract false confessions by torture and condemned innocent people to death. In some tales, the crimes are also exposed with the aid of supernatural forces.

==== Ming Dynasty (1368–1644) ====
In the Ming dynasty, the social influence of the merchant class steadily increased as a result of the development of capitalism. As a result of their change of social status, the merchant class demanded more literary entertainment, thus crime fiction featuring merchants as main characters thrived. These stories particularly focused on the way merchants handled money.

One of the subgenres that developed during the time was swindler stories. Swindler stories focused on elaborate deception for monetary gain. The most famous swindler stories collection is The Book of Swindles by Zhang Yingyu finished in Late Ming. The book is composited with 24 sub-categories of swindles, which covered merely all kinds of deception in Ming society. Zhang wrote the book for a manual of self-protection as well as an expert guide to the art of deception.

=== Translations and Original Crime Fiction During the Republican Era ===
This was the Golden Age of the Chinese detective story. This era was flooded with translations of Western works as well as native Chinese series detectives.

Short story writer Cheng Xiaoqing (程小青 ) was the most successful and prolific author of original Chinese crime fiction during the Republican Era in mainland China. His stories are noted for their similarity to the Sherlock Holmes stories by Sir Arthur Conan Doyle, with selected stories having been published by the University of Hawai'i Press under the title Sherlock in Shanghai in 2007, translated by Timothy C. Wong.

Cheng Xiaoqing's contemporary, Sun Liaohong (孫了紅) also created a series of Chinese detective novels which are said to have been modeled on the Arsène Lupin stories.

=== In the People's Republic of China ===
In the Mao era (1949–1977) of the People's Republic of China, literature involving detective or paranormal elements was banned, but many crime fiction novels written after this time were based within this time period. Stories of crime and detection were characterized as foreign to China.

The novel, Beijing Coma by Ma Jian, is banned due to mentions of the Tiananmen Square Protests of 1989 and time travelling.

He Jiahong (何家弘) was born in 1953 and is a professor of criminal law at Renmin University and was the part-time Deputy Director of the Department of Dereliction of Duty and Infringement of Human Rights in the Supreme People's Procuratorate from 2006 to 2008. His true crime novel Hanging Devils was published in English translation in 2012.

阿乙, born in 1976, is a former police officer who writes darkly realistic crime fiction about migrant workers and the lower strata of mainland Chinese society. His published works include Gray Stories (灰故事), Bird Saw Me (鸟看见我了), and Cat and Mouse (猫和老鼠).

Born in 1986, Sun Yisheng, who writes post-modern crime fiction under the pen name William Edward, is one of youngest crime writers to have been published in mainland China. He has had at least two short stories translated into English, the first in Chutzpah! magazine and the second, entitled The Shades who Periscope Through Flowers to the Sky, in the online literary journal Words Without Borders.

== Crime Fiction Featuring Chinese Language and Culture Published Outside Mainland China ==
=== Hong Kong ===
In Hong Kong, literature writing has long been influenced by both the culture and social backgrounds from China and the Western world. Hence, its crime fiction has incorporated many distinguishing characteristics of all kinds of different crime literatures, depending on the political stance of the majority in Hong Kong and the specific era.

In the 1950s, many non-leftist writers decided to reside in Hong Kong to avoid the political stance of the newly established People's Republic of China. The literature created at that time mainly focuses on anti-PRC, nostalgic and romantic topics. Crime fictions such as Immature, Obscene Society (半下流社会) written by Zhao Zifan (赵滋蕃) were created.

=== Taiwan ===
The first Chinese fiction in Taiwan came out during the period of Japanese occupation, the Showa era in Japan. Before then, most of Chinese fiction was reprinted from Mainland China and it was difficult to find an author from Taiwan. However, this kind of situation has gradually improved since the Taiwan People News (臺灣民報) was first published.

The first Chinese crime fiction written by Taiwanese writer Li Yitao (李逸濤) in 1909 was about a detective story called Deep Hatred (恨海), published by Kanbun Taiwan nichinichi shinpō (漢文臺灣日日新報), but the work has not been finished yet.

=== The United States ===
Qiu Xiaolong was a significant contributor to English-language Chinese crime fiction in the United States. He was born in Shanghai, but following the Tiananmen Square Protests he decided to remain in the US. Throughout his career he published nine crime-thriller/mystery novels. This includes the Death of a Red Heroine, When Red is Black and A Case of Two Cities. Specifically, Death of a Red Heroine was named the best first novel in 2001 at the Anthony Awards. These novels touches on various aspects of the Chinese Culture from ancient Confucianism to modern Chinese politics and justice system.

=== The United Kingdom ===
Diane Wei Liang writes in English and is based in London, UK. She was born in Beijing and educated in the USA. Her China-set Mei Wang Mystery Series are published in over 20 languages worldwide and include The Eye of Jade, Paper Butterfly and The House of Golden Spirit. The Eye of Jade was nominated for The Shamus Award for Best First P.I Novel.

== See also ==
- History of crime fiction
