= Peaches in culture =

Peaches are not only a popular fruit, but also are symbolic in many cultural traditions, such as in art, paintings, and folk tales such as the Peaches of Immortality.

== China ==
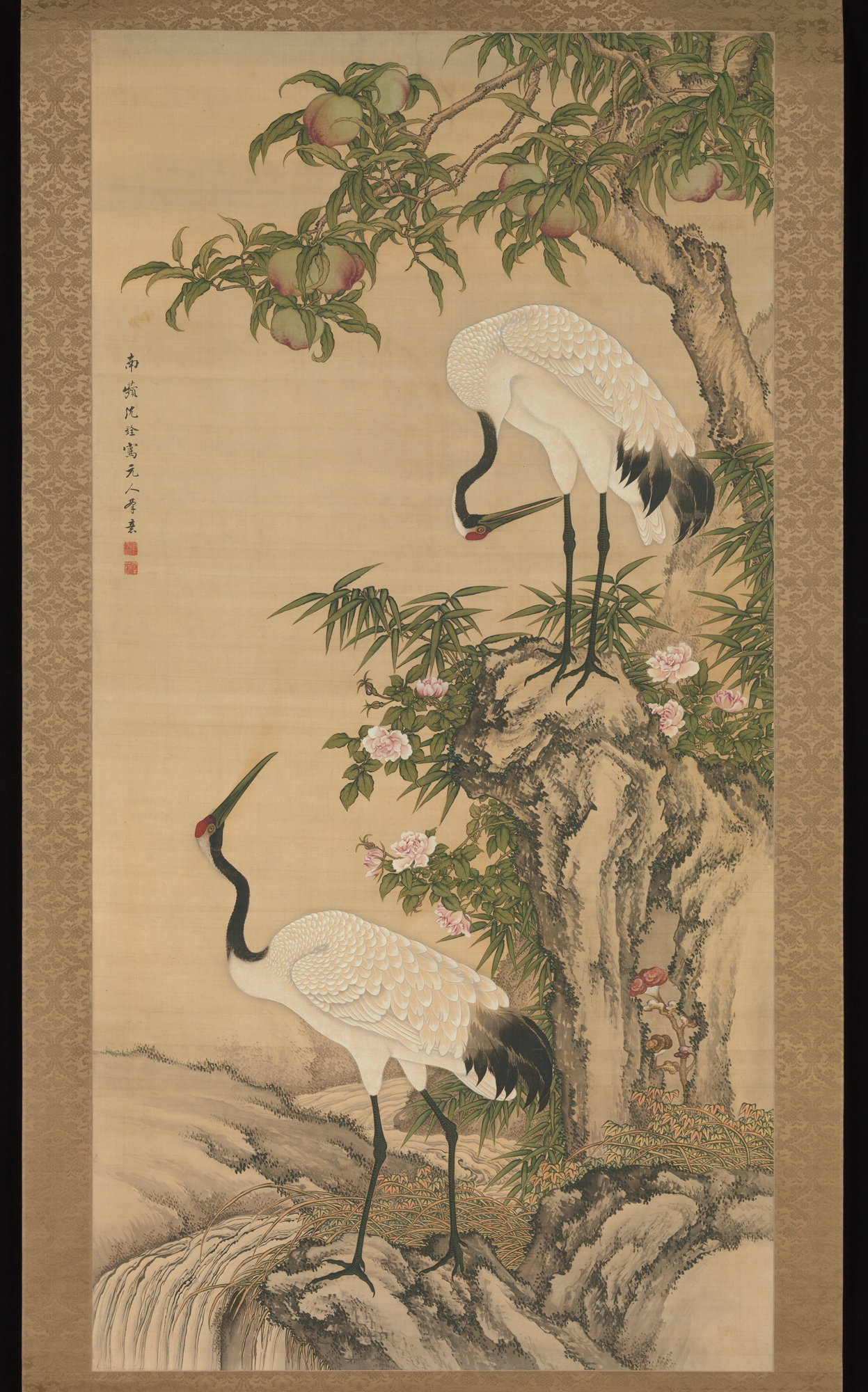
Cranes, Peach Tree, and Chinese Roses, hanging scroll by Shen Quan

Peach blossoms are highly prized in Chinese culture. The ancient Chinese believed the peach to possess more vitality than any other tree because their blossoms appear before leaves sprout. When early rulers of China visited their territories, they were preceded by sorcerers armed with peach rods to protect them from spectral evils. On New Year's Eve, local magistrates would cut peach wood branches and place them over their doors to protect against evil influences. Peach wood was also used for the earliest known door gods during the Han. Another author writes:

The Chinese also considered peach wood (t'ao-fu, Chinese: 桃符; pinyin: Táofú) protective against evil spirits, who held the peach in awe. In ancient China, peach-wood bows were used to shoot arrows in every direction in an effort to dispel evil. Peach-wood slips or carved pits served as amulets to protect a person's life, safety, and health.

Peachwood seals or figurines guarded gates and doors, and, as one Han account recites, "the buildings in the capital are made tranquil and pure; everywhere a good state of affairs prevails". Writes the author, further:

Another aid in fighting evil spirits were peach-wood wands. The Li-chi (Han period) reported that the emperor went to the funeral of a minister escorted by a sorcerer carrying a peachwood wand to keep bad influences away. Since that time, peachwood wands have remained an important means of exorcism in China.

Similarly, peach trees would often be planted near the front door of a house to bring good fortune.

Peach kernels, tao ren (Chinese: 桃仁; pinyin: Táorén), are a common ingredient used in traditional Chinese medicine to dispel blood stasis and unblock bowels.

In an orchard of flowering peach trees, Liu Bei, Guan Yu, and Zhang Fei took an oath of brotherhood in the opening chapter of the classic Chinese novel Romance of the Three Kingdoms. Another peach orchard, in "The Peach Blossom Spring" by poet Tao Yuanming, is the setting of the favourite Chinese fable and a metaphor for utopias. A peach tree growing on a precipice was where the Taoist master Zhang Daoling tested his disciples.

The deity Shòu Xīng (Chinese: 寿星), a god of longevity, is usually depicted with a very large forehead and holding a staff in his left hand and a large peach in his right hand due its associations with a long life. A long-standing traditional birthday food for seniors is a symbolic longevity peach (Chinese: 寿桃包; pinyin: shòutáo bao), a type of lotus seed bun shaped like a peach, frequent in Taiwan and Cantonese culture.

The term fēntáo (Chinese: 分桃), which is variously translated as "half-eaten peach", "divided peach", or "sharing a peach", was first used by Han Fei, a Legalist philosopher, in his work Han Feizi. From this story it became a byword for homosexuality. The book records the incident when courtier Mizi Xia bit into an especially delicious peach and gave the remainder to his lover, Duke Ling of Wei, as a gift so that he could taste it, as well.

== Korea ==
As recorded by the traveller Isabella Bird in 1898, wands made of peach wood are used in parts of Korean shamanism. During the third part of an exorcism ritual for malevolent spirits a wand made of an eastern branch of a peach tree is used. Originating from Daoism, the peach is one of ten symbols of longevity used in Korean art.

An important piece of Korean art features the peach. Dream Journey to the Peach Blossom Land is the only existing signed and dated work by An Kyŏn. It depicts the imagined utopian Peach Blossom Land from a fable by the Chinese poet Tao Yuanming.

== Japan ==
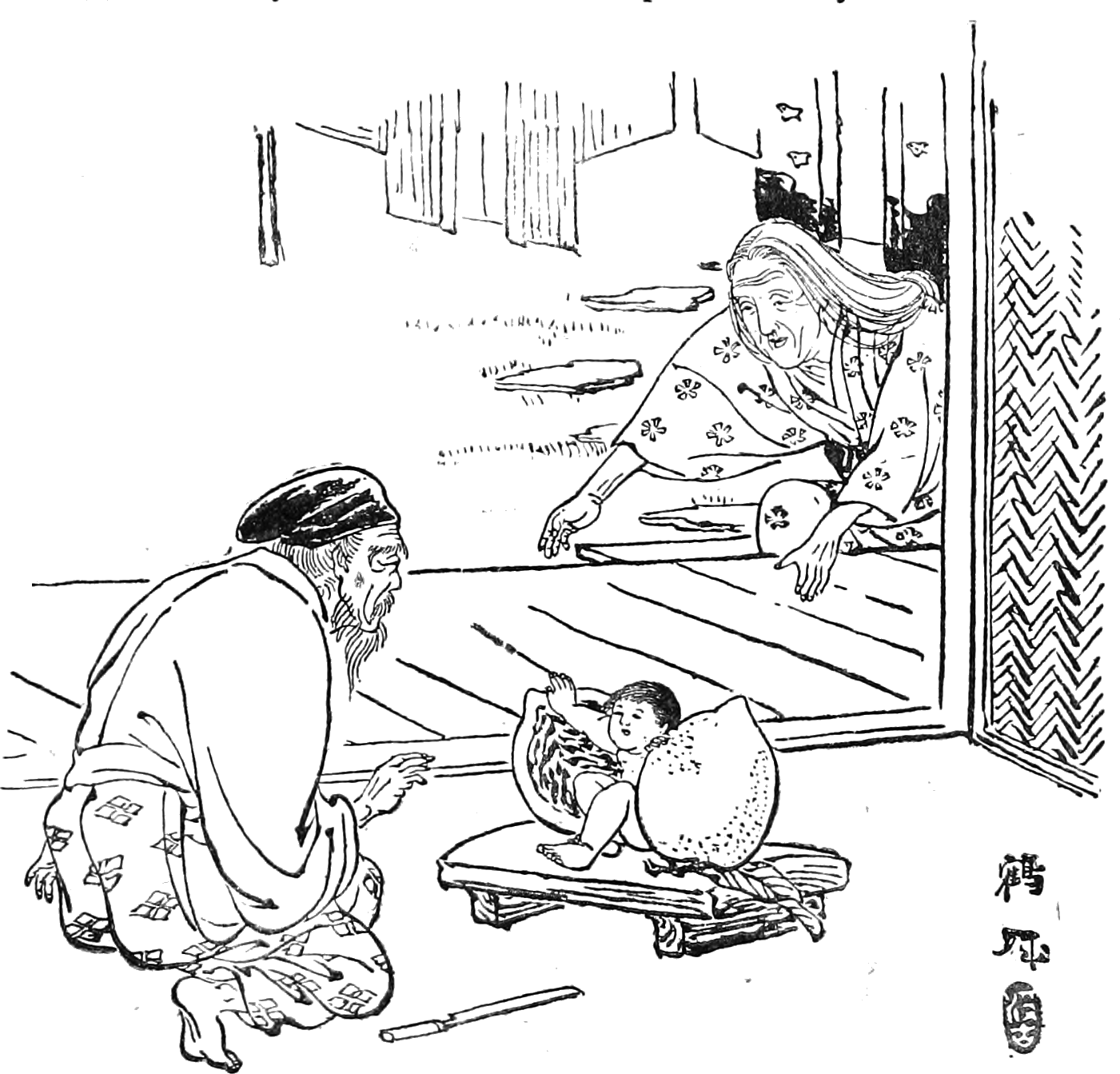
Momotarō emerges from a peach.

The world's sweetest peach is grown in Fukushima, Japan. The Guinness world record for the sweetest peach is currently held by a peach grown in Kanechika, Japan, with a sugar content of 22.2%. However, a fruit farm in rural Fukushima, Koji grew a much sweeter peach, with a Brix score of 32°. Degrees Brix measures the sugar content of the fruit, and is usually between 11 and 15 for a typical peach from a supermarket.

Momotarō, whose name literally means "peach child", is a folktale character named after the giant peach from which he was birthed.

Two traditional Japanese words for the color pink correspond to blossoming trees: one for peach blossoms (momo-iro), and one for cherry blossoms (sakura-iro).

== Vietnam ==
A Vietnamese mythic history states that in the spring of 1789, after marching to Ngọc Hồi and then winning a great victory against invaders from the Qing dynasty of China, Emperor Quang Trung ordered a messenger to gallop to Phú Xuân citadel (now Huế) and deliver a flowering peach branch to the Empress Ngọc Hân. This took place on the fifth day of the first lunar month, two days before the predicted end of the battle. The branch of peach flowers that was sent from the north to the centre of Vietnam was not only a message of victory from the Emperor to his consort, but also the start of a new spring of peace and happiness for all the Vietnamese people. In addition, since the land of Nhật Tân had freely given that very branch of peach flowers to the Emperor, it became the loyal garden of his dynasty.

The protagonists of The Tale of Kieu fell in love by a peach tree, and in Vietnam, the blossoming peach flower is the signal of spring. Finally, peach bonsai trees are used as decoration during Vietnamese New Year (Tết) in northern Vietnam.

== Europe ==
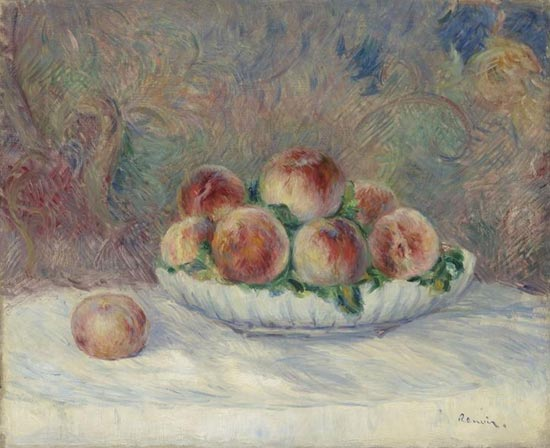
Pierre-Auguste Renoir, A Still Life Painting of Peaches, 1881–82

Many famous artists have painted with peach fruits placed in prominence. Caravaggio, Vicenzo Campi, Pierre-Auguste Renoir, Claude Monet, Édouard Manet, Henri Fantin-Latour, Severin Roesen, Peter Paul Rubens, and Van Gogh are among the many influential artists who painted peaches and peach trees in various settings. Scholars suggest that many compositions are symbolic, some an effort to introduce realism. For example, Tresidder claims the artists of Renaissance symbolically used peach to represent heart, and a leaf attached to the fruit as the symbol for tongue, thereby implying speaking truth from one's heart; a ripe peach was also a symbol to imply a ripe state of good health. Caravaggio's paintings introduce realism by painting peach leaves that are molted, discolored, or in some cases have wormholes – conditions common in modern peach cultivation.

In literature, Roald Dahl deciding on using a peach in his children's fantasy novel James and the Giant Peach after considering many other fruits including an apple, pear, or cherry. He thought the flavor and flesh of the peach to be more exciting.

== United States ==
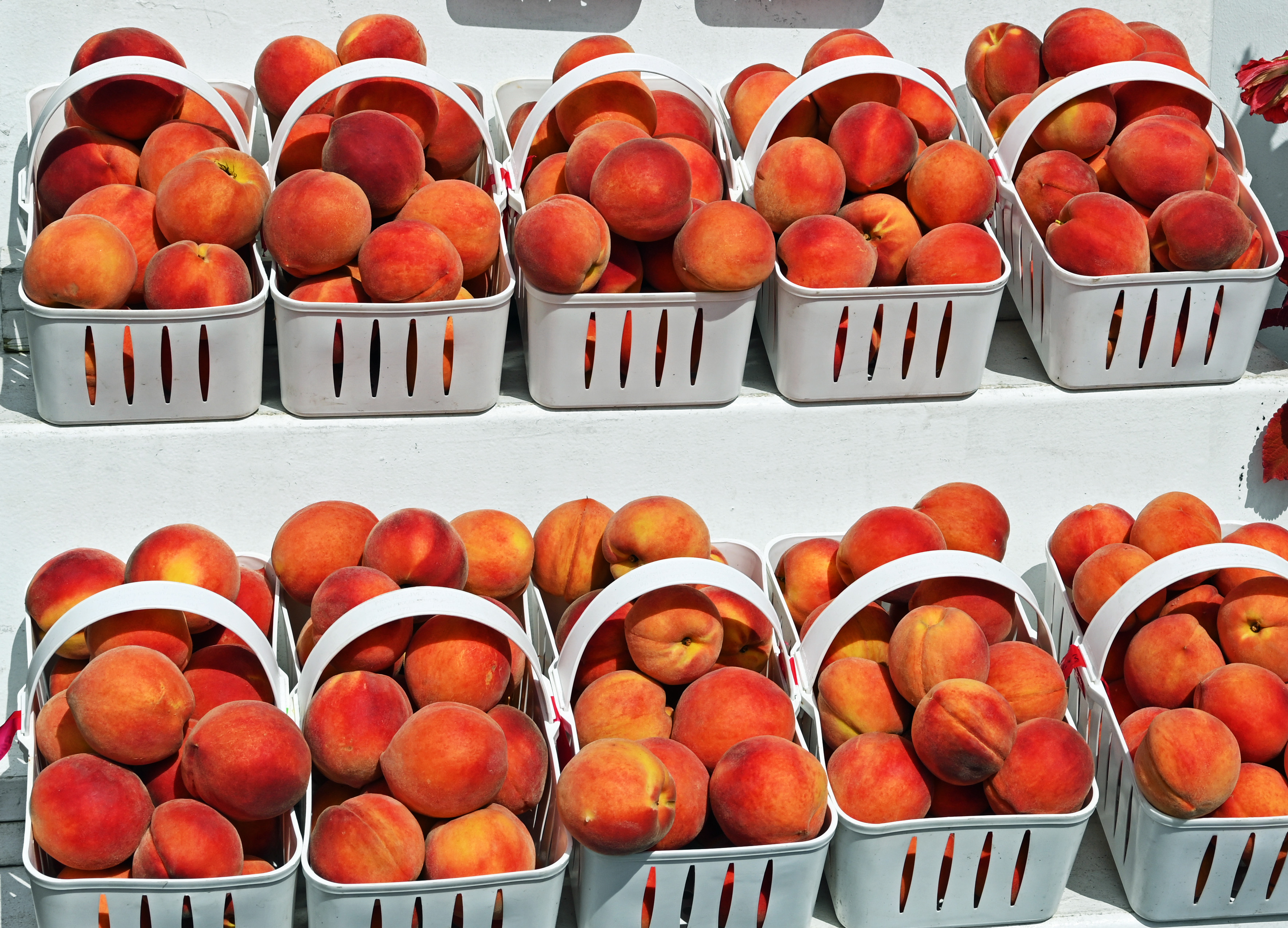
Peaches at a roadside stand in South Carolina

Despite it not being first or even second in peach production and the peach contributing far less than 1% of the state's agricultural production, the peach is strongly associated in American culture with the state of Georgia. However, the peach did not officially become the official fruit of Georgia until 1995. It was preceded by South Carolina, which named the peach its state fruit in 1984. They were joined in giving the peach an official state status by Delaware naming it the state flower in 1995 and designating peach pie as its official dessert in 2009. Alabama named it the state tree fruit in 2006 in addition to the already-designated blackberry.

The peach was marketed by the Georgia Fruit Exchange and later the Georgia Peach Grower's Association as being particularly tasty and special from the 1910s to the 1960s. This also coincided with parts of Georgia wanting to distance itself from being, "the home of slavery and lynching and Confederate memorials," in the words of Frank Smith Horne. The local movement to create a new county centred on Fort Valley to be named Peach County sponsored Peach Blossom Festivals from 1922 to 1926. They promoted a vision of a new progressive south that also ignored the black labor upon which the peach harvest, like that of cotton, depended. Though the acreage of has declined to just one twelfth of its 1925 peak, from 1935, Georgia has been nicknamed the "Peach State".

== Paintings ==
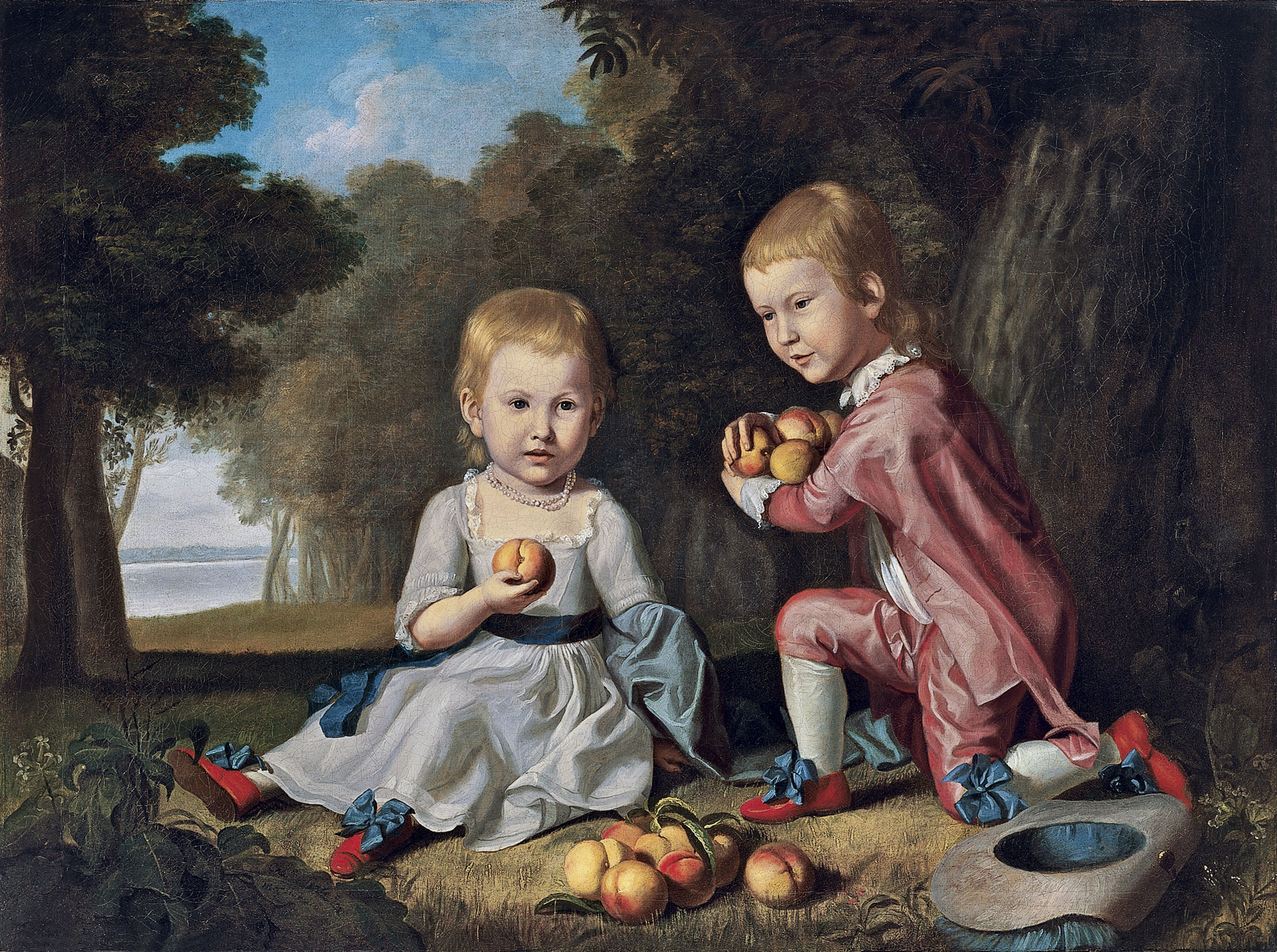
Portrait of Isabella and John Stewart by Charles Willson Peale, 1774

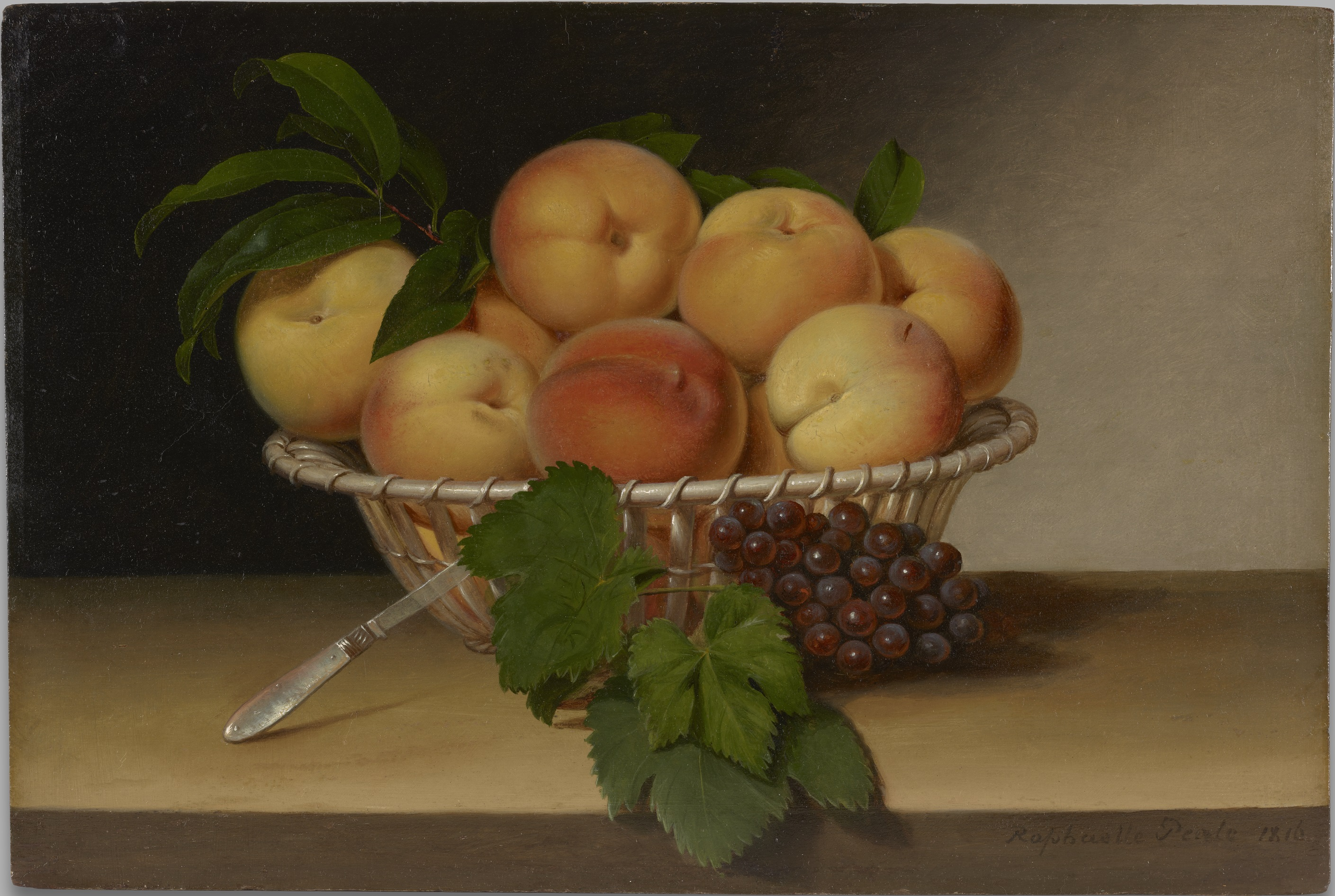
Still Life Basket of Peaches by Raphaelle Peale, 1816

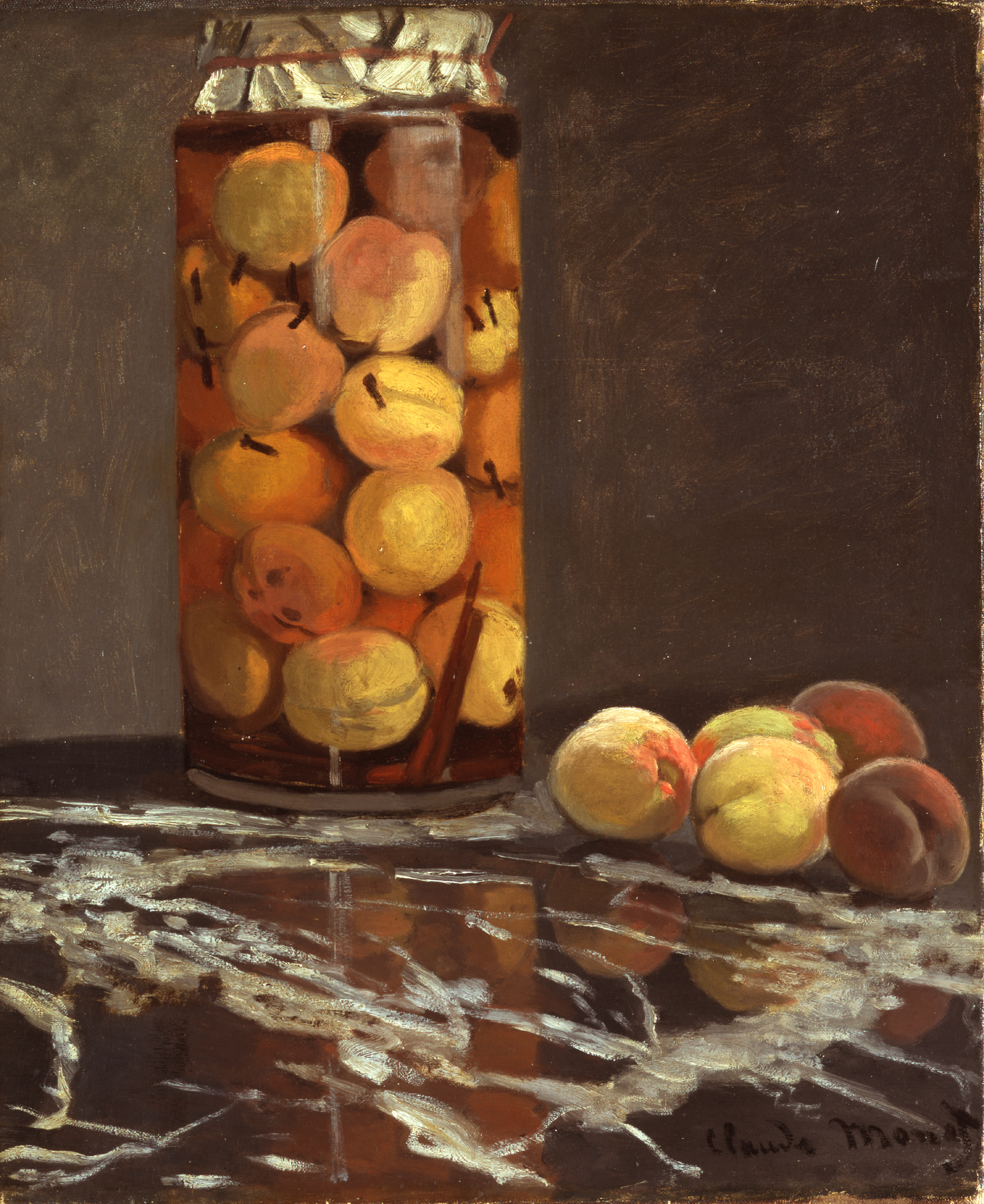
A Jar of Peaches by Claude Monet c. 1866

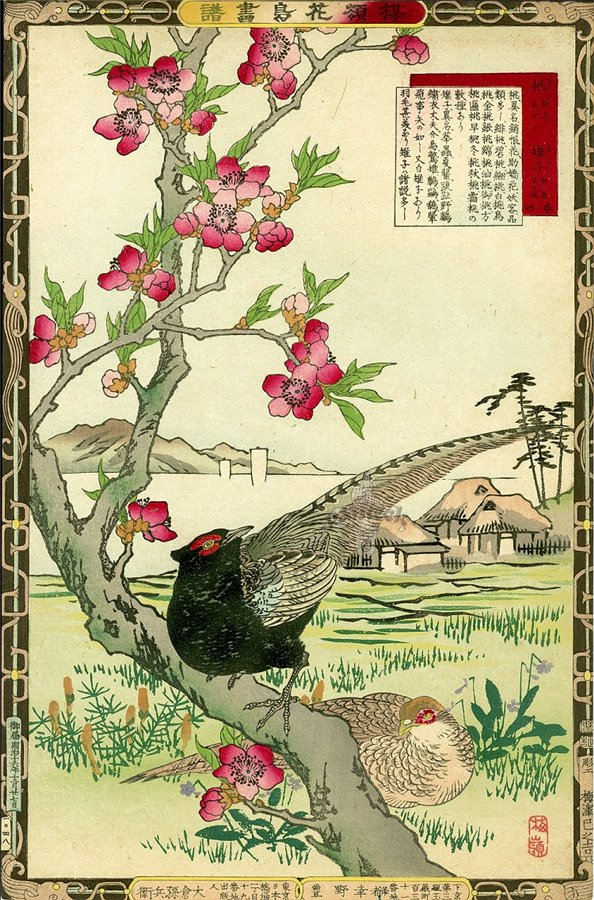
"Spring 4, peach-blossoms and green pheasants" by Kōno Bairei, 1883

== Sources ==
- "State Fruit of Alabama". Official Symbols and Emblems of Alabama. 6 February 2014. Archived from the original on 29 November 2020.
- "State Tree Fruit of Alabama". Official Symbols and Emblems of Alabama. 6 February 2014. Archived from the original on 30 November 2020.
- Aylesworth, Thomas G.; Aylesworth, Virginia L. (1996). Lower Atlantic: North Carolina, South Carolina. Discovering America (First ed.). New York: Chelsea House Publishers. ISBN 978-0-7910-3401-9. OCLC 31328574.
- Bensky, Dan; Gamble, Andrew; Kaptchuk, Ted J. (1992). Chinese Herbal Medicine: Materia Medica (Revised ed.). Seattle, Washington: Eastland Press. ISBN 978-0-939616-15-2. OCLC 28891917.
- Bird, Isabella Lucy (1898). Korea & Her Neighbours: A Narrative of Travel, With Account of the Recent Vicissitudes and Present Position of the Country. Vol. Two (First ed.). London: John Murray. OCLC 1021046487.
- Doré, Henri; Kennelly, M. (1914). Researches into Chinese Superstitions. Vol. V. Translated by Kennelly, M. (English ed.). Shanghai, China: Tʻusewei Printing Press. OCLC 1742009.
- Eskildsen, Stephen (1998). Asceticism in Early Taoist Religion (First ed.). Albany, New York: State University of New York Press. ISBN 978-0-585-06009-5. OCLC 42855374.
- "State Fruit". Georgia State Symbols. Georgia Secretary of State. 2018. Archived from the original on 29 May 2019.
- GIC (2018). "Facts & Symbols". Delaware.gov. Government Information Center. Archived from the original on 20 December 2024.
- Gong, Rosemary (2005). Good Luck Life: The Essential Guide to Chinese American Celebrations and Culture (First ed.). New York: HarperResource. ISBN 978-0-06-073536-4. OCLC 56198749.
- Hinsch, Bret (1990). Passions of the Cut Sleeve: The Male Homosexual Tradition in China (First ed.). Berkeley, California: University of California Press. ISBN 978-0-520-06720-2. OCLC 20755546.
- Janick, Jules (n.d.). "Caravaggio's Fruit: A Mirror on Baroque Horticulture" (PDF). NewCROP (New Crops Resource Online Program). Purdue University. Archived from the original (PDF) on 14 January 2013.
- Kang, Wenqing (2009). Obsession: Male Same-sex Relations in China, 1900-1950. Hong Kong: Hong Kong University Press. ISBN 978-962-209-980-7. OCLC 647840261.
- Leeming, David Adams (2001). A dictionary of Asian mythology. New York: Oxford University Press. ISBN 978-0-19-512052-3. OCLC 44750822.
- Liu, Amy C. (2009). Taiwan A to Z: The Essential Cultural Guide (First ed.). Taipei, Republic of China: Community Services Center. ISBN 978-957-97847-6-4. OCLC 624373150.
- "Peach State, N.". Oxford English Dictionary (online ed.). Oxford University Press. doi:10.1093/OED/9556213713. (Subscription or participating institution membership required.)
- Okie, William Thomas (2016). The Georgia Peach. New York: Cambridge University Press. doi:10.1017/9781107785335. ISBN 978-1-107-78533-5. OCLC 952276835.
- Simoons, Frederick J. (1991). Food in China: A Cultural and Historical Inquiry. Boca Raton, Florida: CRC Press. ISBN 978-0-8493-8804-0. OCLC 20392910.
- Spike, John T. (2010). "Caravaggio and the Origins of Roman Still Life Painting". In De Groft, Aaron H. (ed.). Caravaggio – Still Life with Fruit on a Stone Ledge (PDF). Williamsburg, Virginia: Muscarelle Museum of Art, The College of William and Mary. ISBN 978-0-9705725-6-1. OCLC 700941565. Archived from the original (PDF) on 14 January 2013.
- Sturmer, Jake; Asada, Yumi (17 July 2020). "Japan is home to the world's sweetest peach, and it just happens to grow in Fukushima". ABC News (Australia). Archived from the original on 7 February 2024.
- Sturrock, Donald (2010). Storyteller (First ed.). London: HarperPress. ISBN 978-0-00-725477-4. OCLC 768248123.
- Thacker, Christopher (1985) [1979]. The History of Gardens (Paperback ed.). Berkeley, California: University of California Press. ISBN 978-0-520-05629-9. OCLC 5133474.
- Torpy, Janet M. (20 January 2010). "Still Life With Peaches". JAMA. 303 (3): 203. doi:10.1001/jama.2009.1853. PMID 20085943.
- Tresidder, Jack (2004). 1,001 Symbols: An Illustrated Guide to Imagery and Its Meaning. San Francisco: Chronicle Books. ISBN 978-0-8118-4282-2. OCLC 52152867.
- Valder, Peter (1999). Garden Plants of China (First ed.). Glebe, New South Wales: Florilegium. ISBN 978-1-876314-02-6. OCLC 222405710.
- Vos, Ken (1997). Symbolism & Simplicity: Korean Art from the Collection of Won-Kyung Cho. Leiden, the Netherlands: Hotei Publishing. ISBN 978-90-74822-04-6. OCLC 38855981.
- Yang-mo, Chŏng; Hwi-joon, Ahn; Sŏng-mi, Yi; Lena, Kim; Hongnam, Kim; Youngsook, Pak; Best, Jonathan W. (1998). Smith, Judith G. (ed.). Arts of Korea. New York: Metropolitan Museum of Art. ISBN 978-0-87099-850-8. OCLC 38831761.
