= Homosexuality in China =

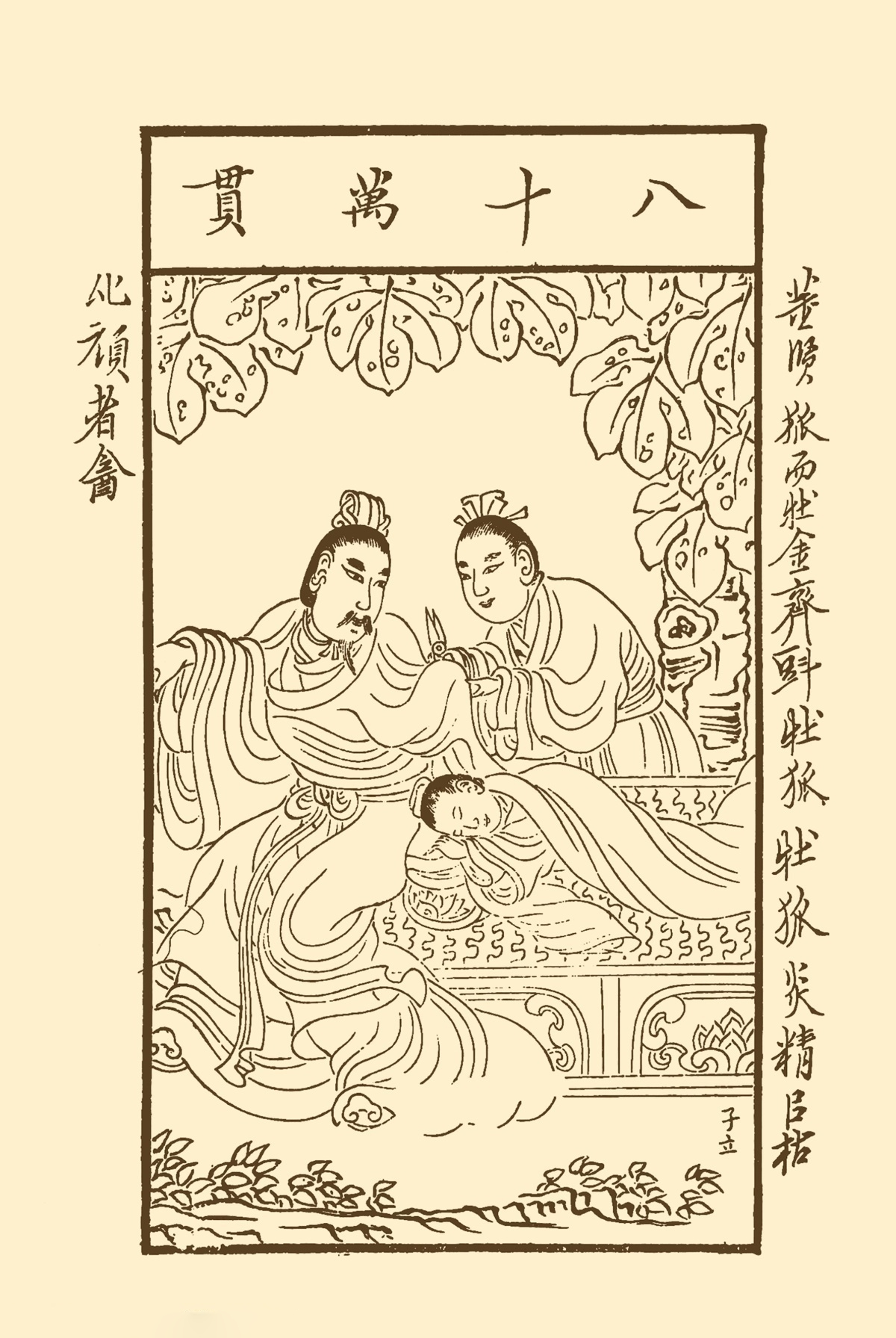
Emperor Ai of Han cuts off his sleeve to not awaken Dong Xian, artwork by Chen Hongshou (1651)

Homosexuality has been documented in China since ancient times. According to one study by Bret Hinsch, for some time after the fall of the Han dynasty, homosexuality was widely accepted in China, but this has been disputed. Several early Chinese emperors are speculated to have had homosexual relationships accompanied by heterosexual ones.

There exists a dispute among sinologists as to when negative views of homosexual relationships became prevalent among the general Chinese population, with some scholars arguing that it was common by the time of the Ming dynasty, established in the 14th century, following homophobia entrenched in the Mongol empire and the Yuan dynasty, and others arguing that anti-gay attitudes became entrenched during the Westernization efforts of the late Qing dynasty and the early Republic of China in the 19th and 20th centuries. For most of the 20th century, homosexuality in China had been legal, except for a period between 1979 and 1997, when male anal sex was punishable as "hooliganism".

In a 2016 survey by the organization WorkForLGBT of 18,650 lesbians, gay, bisexual and transgender (LGBT) people, 3% of males and 6% of females surveyed described themselves as "completely out". A third of the men surveyed, as well as 9% of the women surveyed, said they were in the closet about their sexuality. 18% of men surveyed answered they had come out to their families, while around 80% were reluctant due to family pressure.

There was a step forward for China's LGBTQ+ community after the Weibo incident in April 2018, where the public outcry over the platform's ban on homosexual content led the platform to withdraw the decision. Yet, in 2021, Weibo and WeChat censored the accounts of numerous LGBTQ+ student organizations without any prior warning.

== Terminology ==
Traditional terms for homosexuality included "the passion of the cut sleeve" (Chinese: 斷袖之癖; pinyin: duànxiù zhī pǐ), and "the divided peach" (Chinese: 分桃; pinyin: fēntáo). An example of the latter term appears in a 6th-century poem by Liu Xiaozhuo:

— She dawdles, not daring to move closer, / Afraid he might compare her with leftover peach.

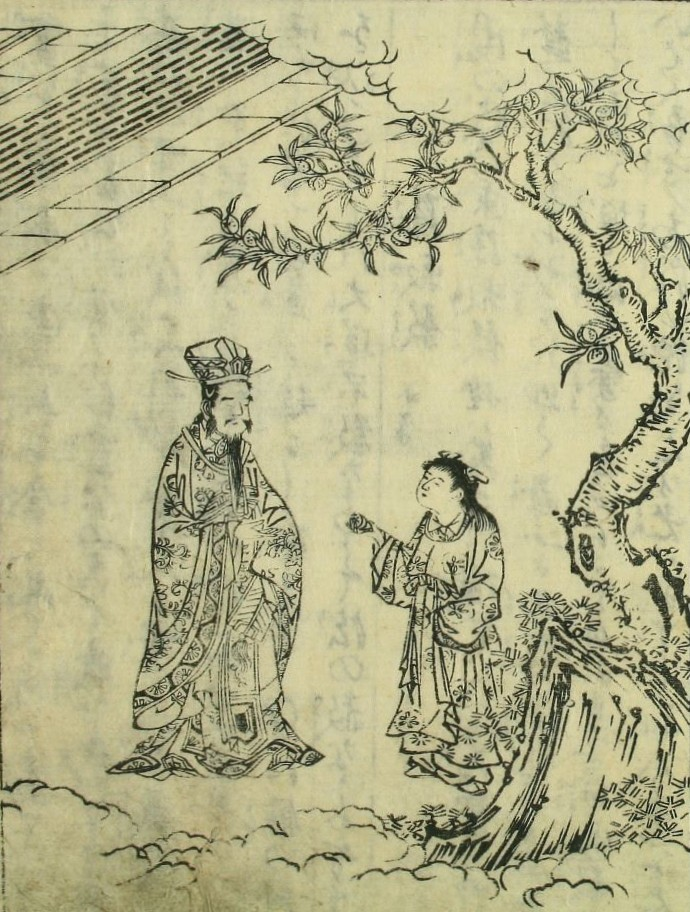
Illustration of Mizi Xia (right) offering a bitten peach to Duke Ling of Wey, from Ehon kojidan (1714) by Tachibana Morikuni

Other, less literary, terms have included "male trend" (男風; nánfēng), "allied brothers" (香火兄弟; xiānghuǒ xiōngdì), and "the passion of Longyang" (龍陽癖; lóngyángpǐ), referencing a homoerotic anecdote about Lord Long Yang in the Warring States period. The formal modern word for "homosexuality/homosexual(s)" is tongxinglian (同性戀; tóngxìngliàn; 'same-sex relations/love') or tongxinglian zhe (同性戀者; tóngxìngliàn zhě, homosexual people). Instead of that formal word, "tongzhi" (同志; tóngzhì), simply a head rhyme word, is more commonly used in the gay community. Tongzhi (lit. 'comrade'; sometimes used alongside nü tongzhi, 女同志; nǚ tóngzhì; 'female comrade'), was first adopted by Hong Kong researchers in Gender Studies, and is used as slang in Mandarin Chinese to refer to homosexuals. Such usage is seen in Taiwan. However, in mainland China, tongzhi is used both in the context of the traditional "comrade" sense (e.g., used in speeches by Chinese Communist Party officials) and to refer to homosexuals. In Cantonese, gei1 (基), adopted from English gay, is used. "Gay" is sometimes considered to be offensive when used by heterosexuals or even by homosexuals in certain situations. Another slang term is boli (玻璃; bōli; 'crystal' or 'glass'), which is not so commonly used. Among gay university students, the acronym "datong" (大同; dàtóng; 'great togetherness'), which also refers to utopia in Chinese, is becoming popular. Datong is short for daxuesheng tongzhi (university students who are homosexuals).

Lesbians usually call themselves lazi (拉子; lāzi) or lala (拉拉, pinyin: lālā). These two terms are abbreviations of the transliteration of the English term "lesbian". These slang terms are also commonly used in mainland China now.

== History ==
The story of Dong Xian, which details the same-sex relationship between Emperor Ai of Han and one of his male concubines, has been cited by Hinsch as evidence of the historical tolerance of homosexuality within the Chinese empire. However, critics have cited the fact that the relationship ended in tragedy and violence to argue that the story was therefore critical rather than supportive of homosexual relationships.

Ming dynasty literature, such as Bian Er Chai (弁而釵/弁而钗), portrays homosexual relationships between men as enjoyable relationships. Writings from the Liu Song dynasty claimed that homosexuality was as common as heterosexuality in the late 3rd century:

All the gentlemen and officials esteemed it. All men in the realm followed this fashion to the extent that husbands and wives were estranged. Resentful unmarried women became jealous.

Some scholars argue that Confucianism, being primarily a social and political philosophy, focused little on sexuality, whether homosexual or heterosexual. Critics have argued that under Confucian teachings, not having children was one of the greatest sins against filial piety, contending that while procreational bisexuality was tolerated, exclusive homosexuality was not. Emperors were still obligated to marry women and raise heirs, and same-sex sexual activities and relationships were merely tolerated as secondary practices. Confucian ideology did emphasize male friendships, and Louis Crompton has argued that the "closeness of the master-disciple bond it fostered may have subtly facilitated homosexuality".

Although Taoist alchemy regarded heterosexual sex, without ejaculation, as a way of maintaining a male's "life essence", homosexual intercourse was seen as "neutral", because the act has no detrimental or beneficial effect on a person's life essence.

In a similar way to Buddhism, Taoist schools sought throughout history to define what would be sexual misconduct. Broadly speaking, the precept against "sexual misconduct" in Taoism relates to extramarital sex. The term for a married couple (夫婦) usually in Chinese suggests a male with a female, though Taoist scripture itself does not explicitly say anything against same-sex relations. Many sorts of precepts mentioned in the Yunji Qiqian (雲笈七籤), The Mini Daoist Canon, do not say anything against same-sex relations, maintaining neutrality.

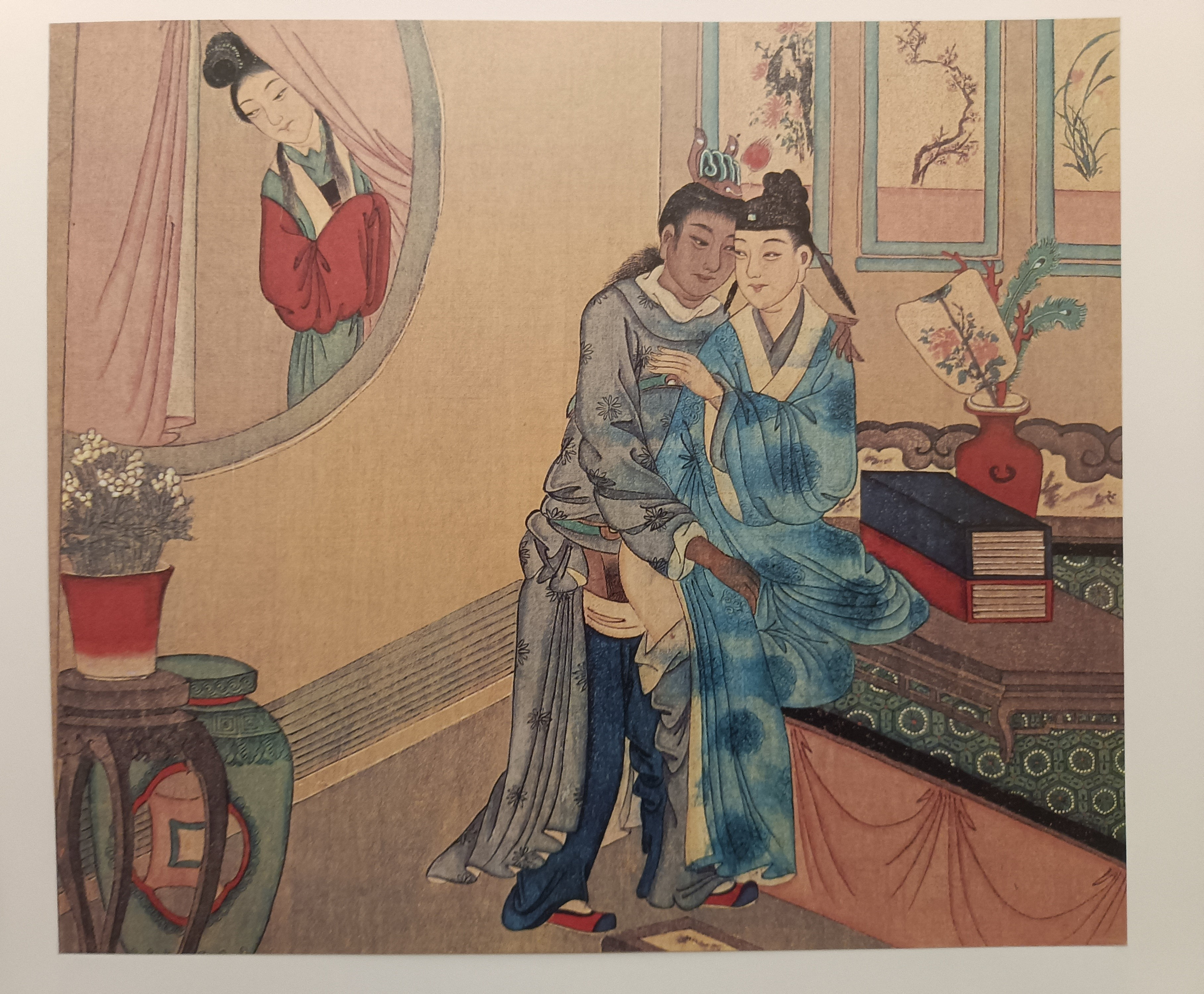
Anal sex between two males being viewed. Painting. Qing Dynasty. 18th Century

Opposition to homosexuality in China rose in the medieval Tang dynasty, but did not become fully established until the late Qing dynasty and the Chinese Republic. There exists a dispute among sinologists as to when negative views of homosexual relationships became prevalent among the general Chinese population, with some scholars arguing that it was common by the time of the Ming dynasty, established in the 14th century, and others arguing that anti-gay attitudes became entrenched during the Westernization efforts of the late Qing dynasty and the early Republic of China in the 19th and 20th centuries.

The Qing Dynasty had complex sociocultural interpretations of sexuality and sexual practices. On the one hand, the Manchurian Qing government revived Neo-Confucian cultural conservatism. On the other hand, male homosexuality thrived in smaller sociocultural communities, such as monks, soldiers, and aristocrats.

For Buddhist/Taoist monks, their hermit and secluded nature made it difficult for heterosexual practices. Soldiers found themselves in a similar position, but because of the Qing Dynasty's gendered draft. Male Qing aristocrats often financially supported male actors, prostitutes, or artists for sexual and/or romantic pursuits, although Confucian expectations for procreation always loomed over their sexual relationships.

In fact, the Qing law, in an attempt to promote Confucian ideals, discouraged all extramarital sex and outlawed all forms of homosexuality. Yet, Qing law enforcement for such practices was questionable at best, and many art forms, such as literature and erotic art, documented the widespread practice of homosexuality.

In Ancient Fujian, the region had developed a sexual culture isolated from that of the rest of the Chinese empire. During the Qing dynasty, the local population began worshipping a Taoist deity known as Tu Er Shen, who served as the guardian of same-sex love. The deity was originally a human by the name of Hu Tianbao. Hu was executed after having been caught peeping on a nobleman he had become attracted to. He was originally destined to go to hell, but the guardians of the spirit realm took pity on him, as his crime was committed out of love. He was then appointed as the guardian of same-sex love.

The Central Qing government of Beijing labeled followers of Tu Er Shen "cultists" and demanded their persecution and elimination. It was during this dynasty that China's very first law against non-commercial same-sex sexual conduct was enacted. However, the newly created offense of homosexuality carried the most lenient penalty possible in the Qing legal system. Today, the Wei-ming temple dedicated to Tu Er Shen, located in New Taipei, serves as the world's only religious temple dedicated exclusively to same-sex love.

The earliest law against a homosexual act dates from the Song dynasty, punishing "young males who act as prostitutes". The first statute specifically banning homosexual intercourse was enacted in the Jiajing era of the Ming dynasty.

Ming dynasty China banned homosexual sodomy (anal sex) in the Ming Code since the Jiajing emperor's reign and continued into the Qing dynasty until 1907, when western influence led to the law being repealed. The Chinese mocked and insulted Puyi and the Japanese as homosexuals and presented it as proof of their perversion and being uncivilized. The only time homosexual sodomy has been banned in Japan was for a short time for 8 years from 1872 to 1880 due to Western influence.

Lu Tonglin, author of Misogyny, Cultural Nihilism & Oppositional Politics: Contemporary Chinese Experimental Fiction, said: "A clear-cut dichotomy between heterosexuality and homosexuality did not exist in traditional China."

Male prostitution was forbidden during the Yuan dynasty (descended from the Mongol Empire) and the following Ming dynasty, and evidence suggests that there was a crackdown on homosexuality during this period as a continuation of the Mongol Empire’s hostility to homosexuality.

== Same-sex relationships in literature ==
Same-sex love can sometimes be difficult to differentiate in Classical Chinese because the pronouns he and she were not distinguished. And like many East and Southeast Asian languages, Chinese does not have grammatical gender. Thus, poems such as Tang dynasty poems and other Chinese poetry may be read as either heterosexual or homosexual, neutral in that regard, depending on the context.

Another complication in trying to separate heterosexual and homosexual themes in Chinese literature is that for most of Chinese history, writing was restricted to a cultivated elite, amongst whom blatant discussion of sex was considered vulgar. Until adopting European values late in their history, the Chinese did not even have nouns to describe a heterosexual or homosexual person per se. Rather, people who might be directly labeled as such in other traditions would be described by veiled allusions to the actions they enjoyed, or, more often, by referring to a famous example from the past. The most common of these references to homosexuality referenced Dong Xian and Mizi Xia.

The Chen dynasty's Book of Chen, records the relationship between Emperor Wen of Chen and his favorite male lover, Han Zigao. Chen famously said to Han: "People say I am destined to be an Emperor, if it comes true, you will become my queen." Chen did become an Emperor in 559, but he was unable to keep his promise to Han and instead, he made him a general. Han spent all his time with Chen until the latter died in 566. Outside the tomb of Chen, discovered in 2013, two statues of pixiu were found, unlike the usual male-and-female design, as both are male and are believed to represent Emperor Chen and Han Zigao.

The Tang dynasty "Poetical Essay on the Supreme Joy" is another good example of the allusive nature of Chinese writing on sexuality. This manuscript sought to present the "supreme joy" (sex) in every form known to the author; the chapter on homosexuality comes between chapters on sex in Buddhist monasteries and sex between peasants. It is the earliest surviving manuscript to mention homosexuality, but it does so through phrases such as "cut sleeves in the imperial palace", "countenances of linked jade", and "they were like Lord Long Yang", phrases which would not be recognizable as speaking of sexuality of any kind to someone who was not familiar with the literary tradition.

While these conventions make explicit mentions of homosexuality rare in Chinese literature in comparison to the Greek or Japanese traditions, the allusions which do exist are given an exalted air by their frequent comparison to former Golden Ages and imperial favorites. A Han dynasty scholar describes in Garden of Stories the official Zhuang Xin making a nervous pass at his lord, Xiang Cheng of Chu. The ruler is nonplussed at first, but Zhuang justifies his suggestion through allusion to a chancellor who received the confessions of a fisherman by singing a song. At that, "Lord Xiang Cheng also received Zhuang Xin's hand and promoted him." A remarkable aspect of traditional Chinese literature is the prominence of same-sex friendship. Bai Juyi is one of many writers who wrote dreamy, lyrical poems to male friends about shared experiences. He and fellow scholar-bureaucrat Yuan Zhen made plans to retire together as Taoist recluses once they had saved enough funds, but Yuan's death kept that dream from being fulfilled.

Other works depict less platonic relationships. A Ming dynasty rewriting of a very early Zhou dynasty legend recounts a passionate male relationship between Pan Zhang & Wang Zhongxian, which is equated to heterosexual marriage, and which continues even beyond death. The daring 17th-century author Li Yu combined tales of passionate love between men with brutal violence and cosmic revenge. Dream of the Red Chamber, one of China's Four Great Classical Novels from the Qing dynasty, has scenes that depict men engaging in both same-sex and opposite-sex acts. In the literary works of the Ming and Qing dynasties, the Yellow Emperor was considered to be the creator of homosexuality, while Laozi was regarded as the originator of the Daoist art of the bedchamber of male homosexuality, although this work is literary and not religious.

There is a tradition of clearly erotic literature, which is less known. It is supposed that most such works have been purged in the periodic book burnings that have been a feature of Chinese history. However, isolated manuscripts have survived. Chief among these is the anthology "Bian er chai" (弁而釵; Biàn ér chāi; 'Cap but Pin'', 'or 'A Lady's Pin under a Man's Cap'), a series of four short stories in five chapters each, of passion and seduction. The first short story, Chronicle of a Loyal Love, involves a twenty-year-old academician chasing a fifteen-year-old scholar and a bevy of adolescent valets. In another, "Qing Xia Ji" (情俠記; Qíng xiá jì; 'Record of the Passionate Hero'), the protagonist, Zhang, a valiant soldier with two warrior wives, is seduced by his younger friend Zhong, a remarkable arrangement as it is stereotypically the older man who takes the initiative with a boy. The work appeared in a single edition sometime between 1630 and 1640.

More recently, Ding Ling, an author of the 1920s in China, was a prominent and controversial feminist author, and it is generally agreed that she had lesbian (or at least bisexual) content in her stories. Her most famous piece is "Miss Sophia's Diary", a seminal work in the development of a voice for women's sexuality and sexual desire. Additionally, a contemporary author, Wong Bik-Wan, writes from the lesbian perspective in her story "She's a Young Woman and So Am I" (她是女士，我也是女士; Tā shì nǚshì, wǒ yě shì nǚshì). Author Pai Hsien-yung created a sensation by coming out of the closet in Taiwan, and by writing about gay life in Taipei in the 1960s and 70s.

Same-sex love was also celebrated in Chinese art, many examples of which have survived the various traumatic political events in recent Chinese history. Though no large statues are known to still exist, many hand scrolls and silk paintings can be found in private collections.

== Gay, lesbian and queer culture in contemporary mainland China ==
Gay identities and communities have expanded in China since the 1980s, as a result of the resurfacing of public dialogue about and engagement with queer identities. Since the 1990s, the preferred term for people of diverse sexuality, sex and gender is tongzhi (同志). While lesbian, gay, bisexual, transgender and queer (LGBTQ) culture remains largely underground, there are a plethora of gay cruising zones and often unadvertised gay bars, restaurants and discos spread across the country. The recent and escalating proliferation of gay identity in mainland China is most significantly signaled by its recognition in mainstream media despite China's media censorship. There are also many gay websites and LGBTQ+ organisations which help organise gay rights' campaigns, AIDS prevention efforts, film festivals and pride parades. Yet public discourse on the issue remains fraught - a product of competing ideologies surrounding the body; the morality of its agency in the public and private arena.

Like most modern societies, public sentiment on homosexuality in China sits within a liminal space. While it is not outright condemned, neither is it fully accepted as being part of the social norm. In many instances, those who associate with the queer community also associate with another marginalised group, such as rural-to-urban migrants and sex workers, and therefore the stigma that is attached to aspects of queer identity is often a manifestation of perceived social disobedience against different intersecting vectors of 'moral rights'. As Elaine Jeffreys and Haiqing Yu note in their book, Sex in China, individuals who interact within the queer community do not necessarily identify as being homosexual. 'Money boys', men who provide commercial sexual services to other men, but do not identify as being homosexual, are an example of such a social group. Their minority status is imbued with aspects of criminality and poverty. This suggests that the 'perverseness' attached to homosexuality in mainland China is not purely informed by a biological discourse, but, depending on the circumstances, can also be informed by accepted notions of cultural and social legitimacy.

The influence of Western gay and lesbian culture on China's culture is complex. While Western ideas and conceptions of gayness have begun to permeate the Chinese gay and lesbian identity, some Chinese gay and lesbian activists have pushed back against the mainstream politics of asserting one's own identity and pushing for social change due to its disruption of "family ties and social harmony". Most of the exposure to Western gay and lesbian culture is through the internet or the media, but this exposure is limited—mainstream symbols of gay and lesbian culture (such as the rainbow flag) are not widely recognisable in China.

Justice Anthony Kennedy quoted Confucius in his majority ruling in Obergefell v. Hodges, leading to discussion of the ruling on Sina Weibo. Chinese microblogging services also facilitate discourse on things like coming out to parents and articles in the People's Daily on gay men.

== Later occurrences ==
In 2009, a male couple held a symbolic wedding in public and China Daily took a photo of the two men in a passionate embrace across its pages. Other symbolic gay and lesbian weddings have been held across the country and have been covered positively by the Chinese media.

In 2012, Luo Hongling, a university professor, committed suicide because she knew her husband was a gay man. She alleged their marriage was just a lie since the man could not admit he was gay to his parents. Luo was considered a "tongqi", local slang for a woman married to a homosexual male, akin to the English term "beard".

In 2016, the State Administration of Press, Publication, Radio, Film and Television banned images of homosexuals on television.

On April 13, 2018, Sina Weibo, one of China's largest and most popular microblogging platforms, announced a new policy to ban all pieces of content related to pornography, violence, and homosexuality. According to Weibo, this act was requested by the "Network(Cyber) Security Law". However, it is unclear which "Network Security Law" Weibo was referring to. In the newest edition of "People's Republic of China Network(Cyber) Security Law" put into effect on June 1, 2017, by the government, media related to pornography is banned, yet the issue of homosexuality is not mentioned. It remains unclear if Weibo's decision reflects its company's own discrimination against the LGBTQ community, or if it foreshadows the government's future policy against this group.

Weibo's announcement sparked the anger of China's LGBTQ community as well as many other Chinese citizens. A Weibo user called "Zhu Ding Zhen 竹顶针" made a post, saying, "I am gay, what about you? 我是同性恋，你呢？" This post was read more than 2.4 billion times and shared by about 3 million users, commented by 1.5 million users, and liked by 9.5 million users in less than 3 days. On April 16, Weibo posted another announcement to reverse its previous decision, stating that Weibo would stop banning content related to homosexuality and expressed thanks to its users' "discussions" and "suggestions".

In 2021, China's government began to crack down on the presence of what it called "sissy men" and "effeminate men" in television, making many in the country's LGBTQ+ community feel "deeply uneasy". Films with gay characters like Call Me By Your Name and Bohemian Rhapsody have also been curbed in the country.

These restrictions remained in the spotlight when social media star Zhou Peng committed suicide just a few months later, leaving a suicide note that stated, "Boys are supposed to be naughty, fight, and swear, and boys who are too quiet and polite are effeminate. I was called 'sissy' at school. I might somewhat appear like a girl when I was younger, but I dressed 'normally' and didn't attempt to imitate girls."

== Legal status ==
Adult, consensual and non-commercial homosexuality has been legal in China since 1997, when the national penal code was revised. Homosexuality was removed from the Chinese Society of Psychiatry's list of mental illnesses in 2001 and the public health campaign against the HIV/AIDS pandemic does include education for men who have sex with men. Officially, overt police enforcement against gay people is restricted to gay people engaging in sex acts in public or prostitution, which are also illegal for heterosexuals. In addition, the declassification in 2001 was never officially recognised by the Ministry of Health (now the National Health Commission).

However, despite these changes, no civil rights law exists to address discrimination or harassment on the basis of sexual orientation or gender identity. Households headed by same-sex couples are not permitted to adopt children and do not have the same privileges as heterosexual married couples.

On January 5, 2016, a court in Changsha, southern Hunan province, agreed to hear the lawsuit of 26-year-old Sun Wenlin filed in December 2015 against the Furong district civil affairs bureau for its June 2015 refusal of the right to register to marry his 36-year-old male partner, Hu Mingliang. On April 13, 2016, with hundreds of gay marriage supporters outside, the Changsha court ruled against Sun, who vowed to appeal, citing the importance of his case for LGBTQ+ progress in China. On May 17, 2016, Sun and Hu were married in a private ceremony in Changsha, expressing their intention to organize another 99 LGBTQ+ weddings across the country to normalize gay marriage in China.

In 2014, a Beijing court issued an unanticipated ruling against the practice of gay conversion therapy. This ruling, however, did not apply nationwide and different district courts have issued various conflicting rulings. In 2016, a Henan court awarded civil damages to a victim of gay conversion therapy who had been physically and psychologically traumatized as a result of the procedure. However, the Court did not expressly prohibit the practice. In parallel to the previous decision, the Henan court's decision also did not apply nationwide. At the national level, no action has been taken against gay conversion therapy and the practice continues to be promoted on a national level. LGBTQ+ activists have been pressuring the central government for a complete nationwide ban.

== Sham marriages in contemporary mainland China ==
Due to social pressure, gay men and women sometimes enter into heterosexual-presenting relationships for appearances. When a straight woman marries a gay man, the woman is known as tongqi; when a straight man marries a lesbian woman, they are known as tongfu. When a lesbian woman and a gay man marry each other, the resulting marriage is known as xinghun, or cooperative marriage.

Much more research has been done on tongqi than on tongfu, although neither has been extensive. Researchers at the Harbin Institute of Technology conducted a study on tongqi and tongfu in China. In their research, they were able to find over 200 tongqi to interview, but only about 10 tongfu. They hypothesized this was because men are less likely to take their complaints online, and are less likely to be aware they are married to a queer person than their female counterparts, so they are less likely to be represented in self-help groups. They also hypothesized that men are more likely to be pressured into marriage than women, due to the social pressure to produce an heir. It is estimated that over 80% of bisexual and gay men in China marry straight women, but the percentage of lesbian and bisexual women who marry straight men is unknown.

Xinghun, or formality marriage, is a tradition among Chinese queers that has seen uptake in recent years. Due to the rise of the internet, and specifically, online dating sites, Chinese entrepreneurs have created services to expedite the marriages of gay men and women to each other. Some examples of these services are the Queers app created to facilitate lavender marriage and Chinagayles.com, a service created in 2005 with over 380,000 registered accounts that has claimed to facilitate over 20,000 sham marriages.

The practice of Xinghun has become more accessible with the rise of the internet, but has also come under more scrutiny in recent years. Most people opposed to the practice were born in the late 1980s and early 1990s when Deng Xiaoping was the chairman of China. Xiaoping's economic policy of "reform and opening up" opened up China to foreign imports but also foreign ideas, such as the acceptance of homosexuality and autonomy in marriage choices. Deng's policies led to a more market-based economy in China and to a populace more willing to express their ideas. Young Chinese people raise issues about the complications that could arise from sham marriages, such as male violence through rape or assault towards an unwilling wife, or the issues that come from raising a child who does not know the full extent of their parents' identities and relationship.

== "出柜" (Coming out) ==
Coming out (出柜) is a crucial component of the experience of homosexuality in China, as it requires navigating complex cultural, social, and political factors. Coming out involves revealing one's sexual orientation or gender identity to others, and it can pose significant challenges and risks for LGBTQ+ individuals in Chinese society. The act of coming out can have a profound impact on the lives and well-being of members of the LGBTQ+ community, particularly in a country like China, where strong traditions and family values are deeply ingrained in the fabric of society. These strong traditions and family values often emphasize the importance of maintaining a harmonious family structure and fulfilling filial duties. One of these duties is to marry and have children, ensuring the continuation of the family line. In this context, coming out as LGBTQ+ may be perceived as a betrayal of these expectations, causing tension and conflict within the family unit. This can lead to social isolation, strained relationships, and even disownment, as family members may feel ashamed or dishonored by an LGBTQ+ relative's disclosure. Additionally, traditional Chinese values place great importance on preserving social harmony, which can manifest in a preference for conformity and adherence to social norms. As a result, LGBTQ+ individuals who come out may face ostracism, discrimination, and harassment from their communities, as their sexual orientation or gender identity may be considered disruptive to the social order. These challenges can make the coming-out process incredibly difficult and emotionally taxing for LGBTQ+ individuals in China. Historically, homosexuality was largely taboo in Chinese society, and individuals who identified as LGBTQ+ faced significant social and legal consequences for their sexual orientation or gender identity, examples range from when the People's Republic of China was just established, being an LGBTQ+ individual was criminalized under "hooliganism" laws, which led to the arrest, imprisonment, and sentenced to re-education through the labor, to homosexuality has been listed as a mental disorder in the Chinese Classification of Mental Disorders before it was taken out of the list in 2001.

In recent years, there has been a notable shift in China towards greater awareness and acceptance of LGBTQ+ individuals, particularly among younger generations who are more exposed to global perspectives on sexual diversity. This progress is evidenced by the growing visibility of LGBTQ+ communities, increased media representation, and the emergence of support networks and advocacy organizations. Despite these positive developments, coming out remains a challenging and often daunting process in China, as LGBTQ+ individuals must navigate a myriad of diverse and complex concerns. They may fear rejection or discrimination from their families, who might struggle to reconcile traditional values with their loved one's sexual orientation or gender identity. Additionally, LGBTQ+ individuals could face ostracism from their peers, colleagues, or employers, further complicating the decision to come out. Legal protections for LGBTQ+ individuals in China remain limited. Same-sex marriage is not recognized, and there are no comprehensive anti-discrimination laws that specifically protect LGBTQ+ individuals. Consequently, many LGBTQ+ people may choose to conceal their identities to avoid discrimination or persecution in various aspects of their lives.

Some LGBTQ+ groups in China use the internet to share information about coming out and offer support to their communities. A 2016 study looked at Shen Lan, an organization based in Tianjin. The group provided health services, HIV prevention information, and education through its online networks. The study also found that government rules and political restrictions affected how the organization carried out its activities and spoke publicly about LGBTQ+ issues.

=== Family and societal expectations ===
One significant factor influencing the coming out process in China is the deeply ingrained cultural concept of filial piety. The notion of filial piety, originating from Confucianism and Chinese traditions, promotes a collection of ethical principles, ideals, and behaviors that emphasize reverence and compassion towards one's parents. Filial piety also places great emphasis on continuing the family line through procreation. A famous saying in Chinese, "不孝有三，无后为大", suggests that of the three major ways to be disrespectful to your parents and ancestors, the most severe one is not having offspring. This saying emphasizes the Chinese individual's obligation to contribute children to the family, a hallmark of filial culture that fundamentally focuses on collective and familial flourishing. Filial piety, deeply ingrained in Chinese culture, is seen as a moral obligation. It is believed in the Chinese culture that, by fulfilling this duty, one can bring honor to one's family and ancestors. Failing to fulfill the moral obligation would be considered unfilial, bringing shame to the entire family. As such, this cultural expectation often discourages LGBTQ+ individuals from coming out, for fear that they will disappoint their families or fail to fulfill their apparent duties.

The main concern for those who would like to come out before reaching marriageable age, which is 22 for men and 20 for women, is that coming out will lead their parents to strongly oppose their sexual orientation out of fear that it contradicts the notions of filial piety, continuing the bloodline, and traditional gender concepts. One such example is the story of Ying Xin, who has been the executive director at the Beijing LGBT Center for seven years and has helped transform the Beijing LGBT Center into the biggest queer community safe space in China. Ying Xin was born in the small city of Xiangyang, in Hubei Province, and she has explained that when she came out, her mother thought she was joking at first. She then became angry, saying, "I didn't think I would have a daughter like this kind of freak." Then she asked, "Don't you feel ashamed to do that kind of thing with girls?"

For individuals who come to realize their sexual orientation or gender identity after they have already married and established a family, coming out can be particularly challenging. These individuals may have been deeply influenced by traditional gender concepts and societal expectations, which may have prevented them from recognizing or acknowledging their true identity earlier in life. They usually face the daunting challenge of potentially jeopardizing their marital or family bonds by coming out.

=== Conversion therapy ===
Despite being extensively discredited by mental health professionals around the world, conversion therapy—a set of practices aimed at changing an individual's sexual orientation or gender identity—continues to be practiced in China. Many LGBTQ+ people are coerced through various means into undergoing conversion therapy by family members who wish to "cure" them of their homosexuality. These conversion therapy practices can take various forms, including electroconvulsive therapy, aversion techniques, and prescription of inappropriate medications, including pills and injections of "colorless liquid", often without informing the individuals of their purposes and side effects. All of these methods have been proven to be not only ineffective but also harmful to the individuals subjected to them. The lasting effects of conversion therapy on individuals' mental health are often negative, such as severe depression, anxiety, and suicidal thoughts. Furthermore, the trauma inflicted by these practices can cause feelings of isolation, self-loathing, and difficulty forming healthy relationships. The consequences of conversion therapy extend beyond the immediate psychological impact, affecting individuals' overall well-being and their ability to lead fulfilling lives.

=== Workplace discrimination and career implications ===
Examining the impact of prejudice in the labor market, taste-based discrimination (TBD) is an economic model that sheds light on how personal biases against specific cultures or communities can lead employers to discriminate against minority groups, including the LGBTQ community, in the workplace. This model posits that some employers, driven by personal biases or prejudices against particular cultures or communities, may discriminate against minority groups. In an effort to avoid engaging with minority applicants, including transgender individuals, companies may display bias, even though it can have a detrimental effect on their financial performance. In the workplace, many LGBTQ+ employees face challenges due to stigma and a lack of supportive policies that protect them from harassment and discrimination. The Chinese Labor Law explicitly provides protection against discrimination based on ethnicity, religion, and gender; it does not include provisions addressing discrimination related to sexual orientation or gender identity. In the same vein, the Employment Promotion Law prohibits discriminatory practices in recruitment and employment but fails to explicitly reference issues concerning sexuality or gender identity. Since many companies lack protective policies and guidelines for LGBTQ+ employees, a majority of these individuals do not disclose their sexual orientation or self-identification in the workplace. A previous study carried out by grassroots organizations in 2013 identified various motives behind LGBTQ+ employees hiding their identity: 60.9 percent were concerned about being marginalized, 51.7 percent believed it might hinder their chances of promotion, and 22.5 percent were apprehensive about losing their jobs. These career-related anxieties are supported by evidence, as another survey discovered that approximately one-fourth of individuals whose sexual orientation was disclosed were either terminated from their jobs or forced to resign. These fears of revealing sexual orientation and negative experiences related to that can contribute to reduced job satisfaction, decreased productivity, and mental health issues such as anxiety and depression.

== Slang in contemporary Chinese gay culture ==
The following terms are not standard usage; rather, they are colloquial and used within the gay community in mainland China, Hong Kong, and Taiwan.

Chinese	Pinyin	English
同性	tóng xìng	same sex
基	jī (Canto : gay1)	gay
基佬	jī lǎo (Canto : gay1 lou2)	gay guy (often used pejoratively)
拉拉	lā lā	lesbian
1 号 (1 號)	yī hào	top (1 symbolises a penis)
0.7 号 (0.7 號)	líng diǎn qī hào	person who prefers to top but can still bottom
0.5 号 (0.5 號)	líng diǎn wu hào	versatile (0.5 is the mean of 1 and 0)
0.3 号 (0.3 號)	líng diǎn sān hào	person who prefers to bottom but can still top
0 号 (0 號)	líng hào	butt hole/bottom (0 symbolises a hole)
搞（攪）基	gǎo(jiǎo) jī (Canto: gao2 gay1)	[lit. to do, vulgar] the activities and lives of gays
攻	gōng	[lit. attack] the more aggressive partner
受	shòu	[lit. accept] the more receptive partner
T		Butch lesbian
P (婆)	po	High femme/lipstick lesbian
C		Feminine male (short for "sissy")
G吧	g BAR	gay bar
18禁	shí bā jìn	forbidden below 18 years of age. Could also mean pornographic material, without regard to sexuality.
同性浴室	tóng xìng yù shì	same-sex bathhouse
出柜 (出櫃)	chū guì	come out of the closet
直男	zhí nán	straight (man)
弯男 (彎男）	wān nán	[lit. curved] gay
卖的 (賣的)	mài de	rent boy (can also be called MB for money boy)
熊	xióng	bear
狒狒	fèi fèi	someone who likes bears - literally 'baboon'
猴子	hóu zi	twink - literally 'monkey'
狼	láng	muscular or athletic gay man - literally 'wolf'
同妻	tóng qi	beard; woman whose husband is gay
同夫	tóng fū	man whose wife is lesbian
掰弯 (掰彎)	bāi wān	to turn a straight person gay
变弯 (變彎)	biàn wān	to turn gay (from straight)

== Culture ==
=== Modern people ===
The following are prominent mainland Chinese and Hong Kong people who have come out to the public or are actively working to improve gay rights in mainland China and Taiwan:

- Wan Yanhai (signatory on The Yogyakarta Principles and participant of 2009 World Outgames)
- Leslie Cheung (singer and actor from Hong Kong - died 2003)
- Li Yinhe (the well-known scholar on sexology in China)
- Cui Zi'en (film director, producer, film scholar, screenwriter, novelist, and associate professor at the Film Research Institute of the Beijing Film Academy)
- Raymond Chan Chi-chuen (Hong Kong legislator)
- Denise Ho (Hong Kong Celebrity/Actor/Singer)
- Anthony Wong (Hong Kong Singer/Activist)
- Suzie Wong (Hong Kong TV Host)
- Elaine Jin (Hong Kong Actor)
- Gigi Chao (Hong Kong Activist/Heiress to Cheuk Nang Holdings)
- Dr Chow Yiu Fai (Hong Kong Lyricist/Activist/Associate Professor of Humanities in Hong Kong Baptist University)
- Winnie Yu (Hong Kong Radio Host/Ex-CEO of Commercial Radio Hong Kong)
- Edward Lam (Lam Yik Wah) (Hong Kong Playwright)
- Chet Lam (Hong Kong Indie Singer/Song Writer)

=== Movies, TV and web series ===
Many gay movies, TV series and web series have been made in Hong Kong and mainland China, including:

- Addicted (web series) (China, 2016 web series)
- All About Love (HK)
- Alternative Love (China, 2016 movie)
- Amphetamine (HK)
- Be Here for You (China, 2015 web series)
- Bishonen (HK)
- Buffering... (HK)
- Butterfly (HK)
- Butterfly Lovers (2005 Stage Act by Denise Ho)
- CEO and His Man / The Same Kind of Love (China, 2015)
- Counter Attack: Falling in Love with a Rival (China, 2015 web series)
- East Palace, West Palace (China)
- Farewell My Concubine (China)
- Ghost Boyfriend (China, 2016 movie)
- Happy Together (HK)
- He Can (China, 2016 movie)
- Homosexuality in China (China, 2009 documentary)
- I Am Not What You Want (HK)
- Lanyu (China)
- Like Love (China, 2014 web series)
- Lost (China, 2013 short film)
- Love Actually... Sucks! (HK)
- Love Is More Than A Word (China, 2016 movie)
- Mama Rainbow (China, 2012 documentary)
- My Lover and I (China, 2015 web series)
- No. 10 YanDaiXie Street (China, 2016 web series)
- Nobody Knows But Me: sequel to Like Love (China, 2015 web series)
- Oppressive Love/Queer Beauty (China, 2016 movie)
- Permanent Residence (HK)
- Portland Street Blues (HK)
- The Raccoon (China, 2016 movie)
- Rainbow Family (2015)
- Revive: Reincarnation of a Superstar (China, 2016 web series)
- A Round Trip to Love (China, 2016 movie)
- Stay With Me (China, 2023 web series)
- Speechless (China)
- Spring Fever (2009)
- (The Scarlet Dreams of) This Summer (China, 2015 short film)
- The Untamed (China, 2019 TV series)
- Till Death Tear Us Apart: sequel to Love Is More Than A Word (China, 2016 movie)
- Tongzhi in Love (documentary film, China/US, 2008)
- To You, For Me (Macao, 2015 short film)
- Uncontrolled Love / Force Majeure (China, 2016 movie)
- Word of Honor (China, 2021 TV series)
- Yóuyuán Jīngmèng

In 2015, filmmaker Fan Popo sued government censors for pulling his gay documentary Mama Rainbow from online sites. The lawsuit concluded in December 2015 with a finding by Beijing No.1 Intermediate People's Court that the State Administration of Press, Publication, Radio, Film and Television (SAPPRFT) had not requested that hosting sites pull the documentary. Despite this ruling, which Fan felt was a victory because it effectively limited state involvement, "the film is still unavailable to see online on Chinese hosting sites."

On December 31, 2015, the China Television Drama Production Industry Association posted new guidelines, including a ban on showing queer relationships on TV. The regulations stated: "No television drama shall show abnormal sexual relationships and behaviors, such as incest, same-sex relationships, sexual perversion, sexual assault, sexual abuse, sexual violence, and so on." These new regulations have begun to affect web dramas, which have historically had fewer restrictions:

"Chinese Web dramas are commonly deemed as enjoying looser censorship compared with content on TV and the silver screen. They often feature more sexual, violent and other content that is deemed by traditional broadcasters to fall in the no-no area."

In February 2016 the popular Chinese gay web series Addicted (Heroin) was banned from being broadcast online 12 episodes into a 15-episode season. Makers of the series uploaded the remaining episodes on YouTube, and production of a planned second season remains in doubt.

== See also ==
- Catamite
- Queer representation on Chinese Film - Cui Zi En 崔子恩
- Greek love
- History of erotic depictions
- History of human sexuality
- History of homosexuality
- Homoeroticism
- Homosexuality in ancient Greece
- Homosexuality in ancient Rome
- Homosexuality in India
- Homosexuality in Japan
- Human rights in the People's Republic of China
- Intersex rights in China
- Kagema
- Kagemajaya (ja)
- LGBT themes in Chinese mythology and folklore
- LGBT in Singapore
- LGBT in the Philippines
- LGBT rights in Taiwan
- LGBT rights in Hong Kong
- LGBT history
- Pederasty in ancient Greece
- Recognition of same-sex unions in the People's Republic of China
- Shanghai Pride 2009 First Event
- Transgender people in China
- Wakashū
