= Tongfu =

Tongfu may refer to:

- Olyphant & Co. (Chinese: 同孚洋行; pinyin: Tóngfú Yángháng), was a merchant trading house or hong in 19th-century China
- Tongfu, Tongxiang (同福乡), a township in Tongxiang, Zhejiang Province, China
- Tongfu (同夫, see tongqi), a neologism for men who have married lesbian women
