= Ou Xiaobai =

Ou Xiaobai (Chinese: 欧小白; born 1983 or 1984 (age 40–41)) is the Chinese designer of the mobile app iHomo, which connects homosexuals with someone of the opposite sex for the purpose of having a heterosexual marriage (Chinese: 形婚; pinyin: xínghūn).

== Biography ==
Ou lived in Beijing with her long-term female partner. Due to increasing pressure from her family, she married a man in 2012. Her husband is also homosexual and has a long-term male partner. During the wedding, Ou's girlfriend acted as her bridesmaid.

An advantage to her marriage is that Ou's mother is reassured Ou will be looked after when her mother dies. In addition, Ou's husband is no longer bothered by his colleagues to date women. The couple visit their parents as a married pair during festivals, but the rest of the time Ou lives with her girlfriend and her husband lives with his boyfriend.

== iHomo ==
iHomo began as a service that Ou ran through social media to help homosexual friends experiencing parental and social pressure to meet others for marriages of convenience. Ou reportedly organised over 80 events and assisted in making 100 marriages of convenience. In December 2015, Ou released a beta version of an iHomo mobile application, designed to allow gay and lesbian users to find each other for marriages of convenience. Beyond matchmaking, the app was designed to provide information on LGBT cafes, shops and restaurants in China, where marriage between people of the same sex is not recognised.

=== Criticisms ===
Ou has pointed out that, for some people, a marriage of convenience can cause more problems than it solves, particularly if the individual's parents live in the same city. In addition, Chinese couples often face pressure from parents to have children soon after marriage. In the event that the couple of convenience has a child, by IVF or other methods, then the question of which couple raises the child and in which house becomes problematic.

== Awards ==
- 100 Women (BBC) - 2016.
