= Recognition of same-sex unions in China =

China does not recognize same-sex marriage or civil unions. Since 1 October 2017, all adults have been able to enter into voluntary guardianship agreements with their chosen guardians, regardless of relationship status and sexual orientation. This system offers the designated guardian limited legal authority, including decisions about medical and personal care, death and funeral, and property management. Some same-sex couples utilize this system to obtain limited legal protections; however, they may face obstacles, including outright refusal or the imposition of discriminatory requirements by local notary offices. Attempts to legalise same-sex marriage in 2020 were unsuccessful, but polling suggests that support for the legal recognition of same-sex marriage is rising in China.

In Hong Kong, the same-sex partners of local residents are able to obtain dependent visas. Same-sex spouses of government employees also receive the same spousal benefits as heterosexual spouses, which includes medical care and joint tax assessment. Hong Kong courts have also ruled in favor of equal treatment for same-sex couples with regard to inheritance rights and parental recognition after the breakdown of the relationship.

== Immigration, tax and inheritance rights ==
=== Beijing ===
Beijing provides dependent residency status to the same-sex foreign partners of legal foreign residents. It is not clear whether this extends to the foreign partner of a local Chinese resident. On 1 July 2013, foreign same-sex partners (including married couples) of residents became eligible for a "dependent resident status". This law only applies to the municipality of Beijing. The key beneficiaries were expected to be white-collar foreign expats whose partners and spouses were able to accompany them and gain residency status in Beijing as a result of the law.

=== Hong Kong ===
In 2014, Hong Kong immigration officer Angus Leung Chun-kwong married his same-sex partner, Scott Adams, in New Zealand. Following the wedding, Leung attempted to update his marital status with the Civil Service Bureau, whose policy states that officers' partners can receive spousal benefits, which includes medical care and joint tax assessment. The Bureau rejected Leung's attempts to extend these benefits to Adams, prompting a legal challenge, Leung Chun Kwong v Secretary for the Civil Service, in court. On 6 June 2019, after conflicting decisions from lower courts, the Court of Final Appeal ruled that the Civil Service Bureau and the Inland Revenue Department had unlawfully discriminated against the couple, and ruled that the same-sex spouse of a government employee should receive the same spousal benefits as an opposite-sex spouse. In 2020, the Inland Revenue Department issued regulations as a result of the court decision stating that "any married person – regardless if he or she is in a heterosexual marriage or same-sex marriage – is now entitled to elect joint assessment or personal assessment jointly with the person's spouse, as well as to claim allowances or deductions in respect of his or her spouse. In addition, he or she is also eligible to sponsor his or her spouse for a dependant visa/entry permit for entry into Hong Kong."

A Hong Kong court ruled in September 2017 that a lesbian expatriate worker could live in the territory with her partner as a dependant and ordered the government to issue her a spousal visa. The ruling was labelled "a big win" by Raymond Chan Chi-chuen, Hong Kong's first openly gay lawmaker. The Hong Kong Government appealed the ruling in November 2017, and it was upheld in July 2018 by the Court of Final Appeal in QT v Director of Immigration. The ruling became effective on 19 September 2018. In September 2020, the Hong Kong High Court ruled that same-sex couples should receive equal treatment under inheritance law. The case challenged the city's inheritance and intestacy laws which forbade a gay person from inheriting the estate of their partner without a will. Judge Anderson Chow Ka-ming ruled in Ng Hon Lam Edgar v Secretary for Justice that the policy was "unlawful discrimination". In May 2021, the Court of First Instance ruled in favor of equal parental rights for lesbian couples in S v KG. The court ruled that following the breakdown of the relationship the non-biological mother should be granted joint custody, shared care and guardianship rights of her children, despite not being legally recognized as the children's mother.

== Guardianship system ==
Laws regarding homosexuality in Asia Same-sex sexual activity legal Marriage performed Marriage recognized Other type of partnership Unregistered cohabitation No recognition of same-sex couples Restricted or ambiguous Restriction on freedom of expression, not enforced Severe restriction of association with arrests or detention Same-sex sexual activity illegal Prison, not enforced Prison Death penalty on books, not enforced Enforced death penalty

In March 2017, the National People's Congress amended Chinese law so that "all adults of full capacity are given the liberty of appointing their own guardians by mutual agreement." Previously, only those over the age of 60 or with reduced mental capacity could nominate a legal guardian. Specifically, article 33 of the amended law, which went into effect on 1 October 2017, states:

An adult with full capacity for civil conduct may, in prior consultation with his/her close relatives, or other individuals or organisations who are willing to act as his/her guardian, determine his/her guardian in writing. The agreed guardian shall perform the guardianship duties when such adult loses or partially loses his/her capacity for civil conduct.

The system, called "legal guardianship" or "guardianship agreement" (Chinese: 意定监护, pinyin: yìdìng jiānhù, Mandarin pronunciation: [îtîŋ tɕjέnxû]), allows any adult with full capacity for civil conduct to designate a guardian. It permits the designated guardian to make important decisions about medical and personal care, death and funeral, property management, and maintenance of rights and interests when the adult becomes incapacitated. Same-sex couples have utilized this system to obtain limited legal protections. The first couple was registered in Nanjing in late 2017. However, many face obstacles, including outright refusal or the imposition of discriminatory requirements by local notary offices. Some notary offices impose requirements such as both partners being out to their families. A 2021 report by the China Notary Association stated that employees of some notary offices "ha[d] been disciplined by authorities for providing voluntary guardianship services to same-sex couples". Some notary offices, when faced with their first same-sex applications, often exhibited extreme caution and uncertainty. In one case in Changsha, the local notary office held a six-hour meeting to decide whether to accept the application, with the discussion focusing on whether approval would "disrupt public disorder or morality". In another case in Guangzhou, an office allegedly demanded that the same-sex couple submit a ¥100,000 deposit, a requirement not imposed on heterosexual applicants, leading the couple to abandon their application. Some notary offices only grant guardianship for property matters but not healthcare, while some offices refuse applications from same-sex couples altogether.

Chinese LGBT activists welcomed the move, calling it an "important, positive first step". Peng Yazi, the director of LGBT Rights Advocacy China, said after having signed guardianship papers with his partner that "if anything happens to one of us, we know our basic rights are protected". As of August 2019, guardianship agreements have been signed in Jiangsu, Hunan, Sichuan, Guangdong, Shanghai, Hubei and Beijing, among others. The practice is more common among older same-sex couples or couples who have been in a relationship for several years. According to a 2019 online opinion poll on Sina Weibo, which garnered over 5 million responses, 85% of respondents were in favour of the guardianship system, while 5% were opposed; the rest being undecided.

== Same-sex marriage ==
=== Background ===
There are documented cases of same-sex unions in Ancient China. During the Song era, there are tales of two men, Pan Zhang and Wang Zhongxian, who fell in love and lived together in a relationship described as "affectionate as husband and wife, sharing the same coverlet and pillow with unbounded intimacy for one another". In modern times, the earliest known advocate for same-sex unions was the 19th to 20th century utopian reformer Kang Youwei, who advocated temporary marriage contracts lasting up for a year. These contracts would have been open to both same-sex couples and opposite-sex couples. However, he did not believe that China was ready for such a historic step, and deferred this policy until the future Great Unity. Chinese Buddhism considers marriage to be a secular issue or a social contract, and therefore not a religious matter. There is no religious marriage service and marriage customs are often adopted from local cultural traditions. Writing for the Journal of Religious Studies in 2022, Andi Fian, an alumnus from the Gadjah Mada University, argued that prohibitions against same-sex marriage in Confucianism may have influenced Chinese Buddhism.

On 13 January 2010, the China Daily published a front-page splash photo of a Chinese couple, Zeng Anquan, a divorced architect aged 45, and Pan Wenjie, a demobilized People's Liberation Army soldier aged 27, being married in a gay bar in Chengdu. The marriage is understood as having no legal basis in the country, and the families of both men reacted negatively to the news of their marriage. In September 2014, Brian Davidson, the British Consul-General of Shanghai, married his male partner, Scott Chang, in a ceremony officiated by Ambassador Sebastian Wood at his residence in Beijing. The marriage was performed under British law and lacks legal recognition in China, though the ceremony provoked mixed reactions in China. During the COVID-19 pandemic, the U.S. state of Utah established an online civil marriage service for couples wishing to marry. The marriage is officiated by Zoom and for an additional fee the couple can obtain an apostille validation stamp for the marriage license provided by Utah state authorities. By October 2022, around 200 same-sex couples in China had married via this online service, though the marriages have no legal status in China. The move has also become particularly popular in Israel where same-sex marriages performed abroad are legally recognised.

According to certain estimates from 2010, about 80% to 90% of Chinese gay men were married to women, who are known in Chinese as tongqi (同妻, pinyin: tóngqī). These marriages, often called "sham marriages", are attributed to the fact that there is significant social pressure from family to marry and to found a family with a partner of the opposite sex. In most of these cases, the women are unaware of their husbands' sexual orientation. In 2012, a professor at Sichuan University committed suicide after her husband came out as gay. In some cases, lesbians and gay men deliberately choose to marry each other. Research has shown that the social well-being of gay men and lesbians is significantly deteriorated by these "sham marriages", resulting in estrangement from family and suicide.

=== Court cases ===
On 5 January 2016, a court in Changsha, agreed to hear a lawsuit filed in December 2015 against the Bureau of Civil Affairs of Furong District. The lawsuit was filed by 26-year-old Sun Wenlin, who in June 2015 had been refused permission to marry his 36-year-old partner, Hu Mingliang. On 13 April 2016, with hundreds of same-sex marriage supporters outside, the court ruled against Sun, who said he would appeal. On May 17, 2016, Sun and Hu were married in a private ceremony in Changsha, expressing their intention to organize another 99 same-sex weddings across the country in order to normalize same-sex marriage in China.

On 12 April 2021, the Shenyang Intermediate People's Court ruled that same-sex couples were not entitled to the same property rights as married spouses. In this case, a woman in Shenyang had sued her former partner of 50 years for having sold the house the couple had lived in together. While the house was registered only in the partner's name, the woman claimed they had bought it together, and had each verbally agreed to a 50% stake in the property. The partner also countersued, alleging that the woman had stolen ¥294,000 from her bank account. The court dismissed both petitions. Ouyang Jintong, a lawyer at Beijing Yingke Law Firm, said the court should have considered the length of the couple's relationship and cohabitation while arriving at its verdict, stating, "The couple lived together, shared wealth, comforted each other, and relied on each other in their twilight years, but their union could not be recognized as marriage because they were of the same sex, even though their lives were consistent with the essence of marriage."

=== Legal proposals ===
The Marriage Law of the People's Republic of China (Chinese: 中华人民共和国婚姻法, pinyin: Zhōnghuá Rénmín Gònghéguó Hūnyīn Fǎ, pronounced [ʈʂʊ́ŋxwǎ ʐə̌nmǐn kʊ̂ŋxɤ̌kwǒ xwə́nín fà]) (Note: In some of the official regional languages of China: Cantonese romanization: Jūng'wàh Yàhnmàhn Guhng'wòhgwok Fānyān Faat, pronounced [tsóŋwȁː jɐ̏nmɐ̏n kòŋwɔ̏ːkʷɔ̄ːk̚ fɐ́njɐ́n fāːt̚]; Zhuang: Fap Vunhyinh Cunghvaz Yinzminz Gunghozgoz, pronounced [fa᷄ːp wūnjīn ɕūŋwa᷆ː jı᷆nmı᷆n ku᷄ŋho᷆ːko᷆ː]; Uyghur: ﺟﯘﯕﺨﯘﺍ ﺧﻪﻟﻖ جۇمھۇرىيىتى نىكاھ قانۇنى, Jungxua Xelq Jumhuriyiti Nikah Qanuni; Tibetan: ཀྲུང་ཧྭ་མི་དམངས་སྤྱི་མཐུན་རྒྱལ་ཁབ་ཀྱི་གཉེན་སྒྲིག་བཅའ་ཁྲིམས, krung hwa mi dmangs spyi mthun rgyal khab kyi gnyen sgrig bca' khrims, pronounced [ʈʂʊ́ŋhá mɪ̀mâŋ tɕítʰỹ́ːcɛ̀ːkʰáʔ cí ɲẽ́ʈʂɪ̀ʔtɕáʔ ʈʂʰɪ̂m]; Mongolian: ᠪᠦᠭᠦᠳᠡ ᠨᠠᠶᠢᠷᠠᠮᠳᠠᠬᠤ ᠬᠢᠲᠠᠳ ᠠᠷᠠᠳ ᠤᠯᠤᠰ ᠤᠨ ᠭᠡᠷᠯᠡᠯᠲᠡ ᠶᠢᠨ ᠲᠤᠬᠠᠢ ᠬᠠᠤᠯᠢ, Bügd Najramdax Xjatad Ard Ulsyn Gerleltiin Tuxaj Xuul', pronounced [ˈpuɡt ˈnɛːramtax ˈxjatʰat art ˈʊɮsiŋ ˈgerɮeɮtʰiːŋ ˈtʰʊxɛː ˈxʊːɮʲ]; Portuguese: Lei do Casamento da República Popular da China, pronounced [ˈlɐj ðu kɐzɐˈmẽtu ðɐ ʁɛˈpuβlikɐ pupuˈlaɾ ðɐ ˈʃinɐ]; In some other languages of China: Bouyei: Faf Hunyyiny Zungyhuaf Renfminf Gungqhofguef; Hlai: Dongxghwax Naengsmiens Gong'hwasgok Hunxinxpat; Hmong: Txoj cai kev sib yuav ntawm cov neeg lub koom pheej ntawm Tuam Tshoj, pronounced [tsɔ̂cāi̯ kěʂíʝǔə̯ nda̰ɨ̯ cɔ̌nẽ̤lúkɔ̰̃pʰẽ̂ nda̰ɨ̯ tṵə̯ʈʂʰɔ̂]; Kazakh: جۇڭحۋا حالىق رەسپۋبليكاسىنىڭ نەكە زاڭى, Jūñxua Halyq Respublikasynyñ Neke Zañy; Korean: 중화인민공화국의 결혼법은, Junghwainmin'gonghwagugui Gyeolhonbeobeun; Manchu: ᠵᡠᠩᡥᡡᠸᠠ ᠨᡳᠶᠠᠯᠮᠠᡳᡵᡤᡝᠨ ᡤᡠᠨᡥᡝᡬᠣ ᡳ ᡥᠣᠯᠪᠣᠨ ᠪᠠᡳᡨᠠᡳ ᡶᠠᡶᡠᠨ, Junghūwa niyalmairgen gungheg'o i holbon baitai fafun; Yi: ꍏꉸꏓꂱꇭꉼꇩꃝꐨꏦꃤ, Zho huop rep mip gop hop guop fur jjux jie vi, pronounced [tʂō̝xɔ̠̂ ʐɤ̝̂mê̝kô̝xô̝kɔ̠̂ fv̠̩̄ʷdʑv̩́ʷtɕɛ̠̄vē̝]) defined marriage as the union of "a man and a woman", but this law was repealed in 2021. Li Yinhe, a sexology scholar well known in the Chinese LGBT community, proposed the Chinese Same-Sex Marriage Bill (中国同性婚姻提案, Zhōngguó Tóngxìng Hūnyīn Tí'àn) as an amendment to the marriage law at the Chinese People's Political Consultative Conference in 2003, 2005, 2006 and 2008. All four proposals failed because she was unable to find enough cosponsors for a placement on the agenda. Li pledged to "continue proposing the bill until it is passed". In 2008, supporters of LGBT rights launched a signature campaign calling for the recognition of same-sex marriage. In 2012, Li launched a new campaign to raise support for same-sex marriage legislation.

There were unsuccessful attempts to include provisions legalising same-sex marriage in the new Civil Code in 2020. In August 2019, a parliament spokesman said that "limiting marriage to a relationship between a man and a woman will remain China's legal position". In December 2019, LGBT activists announced they had gathered over 200,000 signatures in support of same-sex marriage. Later that month, Yue Zhongming, a spokesman for the Commission for Legislative Affairs of the National People's Congress Standing Committee, said that the National People's Congress would review the possibility of opening marriage to same-sex couples in March 2020 and opened the topic to public comments. Several government-related Sina Weibo accounts launched online opinion polls to gauge public support for same-sex marriage, with results as of 22 December 2019 being a ratio of 6 to 4 in favor. Results of an online Phoenix Network survey, which had garnered close to 10 million votes, showed a 67% majority in favor of same-sex marriage. In May 2020, an official from the Standing Committee of the National People's Congress claimed that the signatures and comments in support of same-sex marriage the committee had received were "copied and pasted" and said that the ban on same-sex marriage would not be repealed. Article 1046 of the code states: "A man and a woman shall enter into marriage freely and voluntarily. Neither party may compel the other party to enter into marriage against his will, and no organization or individual may interfere with the freedom of marriage."

=== Government attitude ===
Despite the Chinese Society of Psychiatry having removed homosexuality from its list of mental illnesses in 2001, such change is yet to be reflected by the regulations of the National Health and Family Planning Commission. A government spokesperson, when asked about Li Yinhe's proposal, said that same-sex marriage was still too "ahead of time" for China. He argued that same-sex marriage was not recognized even in many Western countries, which are considered much more liberal on social issues than China. This statement is understood as an implication that the government may consider recognition of same-sex marriage in the long run, but not in the near future. In addition, the Chinese Government requires parents adopting children from China to be in heterosexual marriages. The Chinese Government did invite the Prime Minister of Iceland, Jóhanna Sigurðardóttir, and her wife, Jónína Leósdóttir, on an official state visit in April 2013. Leósdóttir was largely absent from official media coverage of the visit but she was fully recognized as Sigurðardóttir's wife and was received as such at official functions, official residences and a reception at Beijing Foreign Studies University.

After the Taiwanese Constitutional Court ruled in May 2017 that banning same-sex marriage was unconstitutional under the Constitution of the Republic of China, attitudes were largely positive on the social media platform Sina Weibo. Li Yinhe claimed that a majority of Chinese people under the age of 35 supported same-sex marriage. Pointing out that the average age of members of the National People's Congress was 49, she concluded that same-sex marriage was "only 14 years away". Days after the same-sex marriage law came into effect in Taiwan in May 2019, the People's Daily posted a celebratory tweet, "local lawmakers in Taiwan, China, have legalized same-sex marriage in a first for Asia." The tweet, which included a rainbow-colored GIF that read "love is love" angered the Foreign Minister of Taiwan, Joseph Wu, who retaliated, "The bill was passed by our national parliament [and] will be signed by the president soon." Nonetheless, Chinese authorities signaled that they would not follow Taiwan's lead on same-sex marriage. An Fengshan, a spokesman for China's Taiwan Affairs Office, said that the government "noted reports on the island" about same-sex marriage and that "the mainland has a marriage system of one man, one woman". At the time, some Chinese LGBT activists estimated that China was "at least a decade away" from legalising same-sex marriages, with priorities on introducing anti-discrimination laws, allowing LGBT groups to raise awareness without fear and censorship, and banning conversion therapy.

== Public opinion ==
Support for same-sex marriage among 18–21-year-olds according to a 2016 survey from the Varkey Foundation

A poll conducted in 2009 showed that over 30% of the Beijing population supported same-sex marriage, while the rest were unsure or opposed. A 2014 survey found that 74% of Hong Kong residents supported granting same-sex couples either all or some of the benefits associated with marriage.

A 2015 Ipsos opinion poll found that 29% of Chinese people supported same-sex marriage, another 29% supported civil unions or partnerships which would offer some of the rights of marriage, while 21% were against any legal recognition for same-sex couples. The poll reflects the online population which tends to be more urban. Support is higher among young people, with a September–October 2016 survey by the Varkey Foundation showing that 54% of 18–21-year-olds supported same-sex marriage in China.

A 2017 poll conducted by the University of Hong Kong found that 50.4% of Hong Kong residents supported same-sex marriage. An August 2022 poll conducted by the Hong Kong Public Opinion Research Institute found that 86% Hongkongers aged 18 to 40 thought that LGBT people "should be treated fairly and should not be discriminated against". In addition, 75% of young Hongkongers supported same-sex marriage.

An online opinion poll from Phoenix Network in December 2019, which garnered close to 10 million votes, showed a 67% majority in favor of same-sex marriage in China. A May 2021 Ipsos poll showed that 43% of Chinese people supported same-sex marriage, 20% supported civil partnerships but not marriage, while 19% were opposed to all legal recognition for same-sex couples, and 18% were undecided. A July 2024 poll by the Williams Institute found that 52% of Chinese people agreed that same-sex couples should be able to marry.

== See also ==
- LGBT rights in China
- Homosexuality in China
- Same-sex marriage in Taiwan
- Recognition of same-sex unions in Hong Kong
- Recognition of same-sex unions in Asia
