= Tongzhi (term) =

Chinese word for 'comrade'

- Chinese: 同志
- Literal meaning: 'same will', 'same purpose', 'comrade'
Transcriptions
Standard Mandarin
- Hanyu Pinyin: tóngzhì
- Bopomofo: ㄊㄨㄥˊ ㄓˋ
- Gwoyeu Romatzyh: torng jyh
- Wade–Giles: tʻung chih
- Tongyong Pinyin: tóngjhì

Tongzhi is a form of style used in China that took on different meanings in the 20th century depending on context. It was first introduced into vernacular Chinese by Sun Yat-sen as a way of describing his followers. Following the establishment of the People's Republic of China (PRC), tongzhi used to mean "comrade" in a communist sense: it was used to address almost everyone, male and female, young and old. In recent years, however, this meaning of the term has fallen out of common usage, except within Chinese Communist Party (CCP) discourse and among people of older generations.

In contemporary Taiwan, Macau, and Hong Kong, the term mainly refers to LGBT people instead of the traditional political usage.

== In party politics ==
It remains in use in a formal context among political parties in both mainland China and Taiwan. Within the Chinese Communist Party (CCP), categorizing a person as a comrade is especially significant for a person who has been denounced or demoted, because it indicates that the party has not completely rejected the person as "one of its own". In Taiwan, the term also remains in formal usage in party politics. For example, after losing the 2008 presidential election, Frank Hsieh said: "many comrades hoped that I could stay till May 25" (很多同志希望我能夠留到五月二十五日).

In October 2014, the CCP reiterated the necessity of its members using "comrade" to refer to one another. Earlier in May, the party's disciplinary committee in Guangdong province had banned its members from addressing one another as "boss", "buddy", or "bro". The committee reasoned that these terms are known to be used in private enterprises or mafia circles, and thus are "influences of bureaucratism and sectarianism" which "blemish[es] the party and government's image".

=== Military use ===
The word comrade is in the regulations of the People's Liberation Army (PLA) as one of three appropriate ways to formally address another member of the military ("comrade" plus rank or position, as in "Comrade Colonel", or simply "comrade" when lacking information about the person's rank, or talking to several people).

== LGBTQ community use ==
Since the 1990s, the term is increasingly being used to refer to sexual minorities in Macau, Hong Kong, mainland China, and Taiwan. This use of the term was first adopted by Michael Lam, a columnist for the Hong Kong-based City Magazine, and was popularized by the inaugural Hong Kong Lesbian and Gay Film Festival in 1989, whose aim was to present same-sex relationships as positive and suggesting solidarity between LGBT people, while also providing an indigenous term to describe same-sex love.

In LGBT communities, Tongzhi is preferred over tongxinglian (同性戀), the formal word for homosexuality, as the latter is seen as overly clinical and pathological in its connotations.

Although the term initially referred to gay (男同志, 'male tongzhi') and lesbian (女同志, 'female tongzhi') people, in recent years its scope has gradually expanded to cover a wider spectrum of identities, analogous to "LGBTQ+". For example, Taiwan Pride can be translated literally as "Taiwan tongzhi parade". According to Chou Wah-shan, tongzhi is a fluid term that can refer to any person who is not heteronormative, as well as a means of signifying "politics beyond the homo-hetero duality" and "integrating the sexual into the social".

== See also ==
- Homosexuality in China
- Taiwan Tongzhi Hotline Association
- Tongqi
- Generation gap
- LGBT topics and Confucianism
- Tovarishch (disambiguation)
