= Bian er chai =

Ming dynasty-era anthology of homoerotic short stories

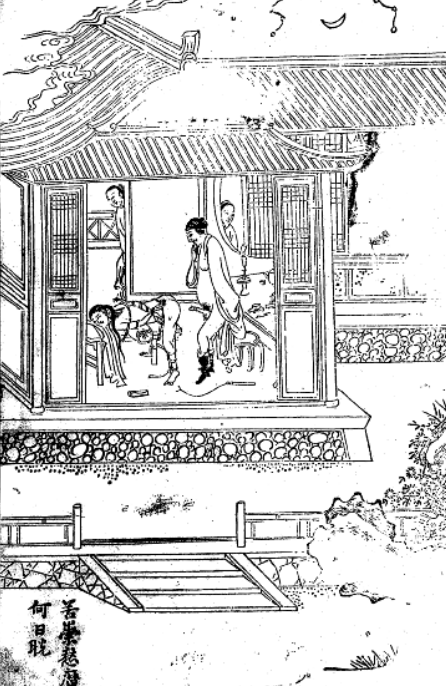
- An illustration of a rape scene in the fourth story "Qingqi ji" (情奇纪) from an edition of Bian er chai published in the Ming dynasty, c. 1639.
- Author: "The Moon-Heart Master of the Drunken West Lake" (醉西湖心月主人)
- Original title: 弁而釵
- Language: Chinese
- Publication date: c. 1628–1644
- Publication place: China (Ming dynasty)
- Media type: Print

Bian er chai (Chinese: 弁而釵; pinyin: Biàn ér chāi) (Note: Translated into English as Caps with Hairpins, Hairpins Beneath His Cap or Hairpins Beneath the Cap.) is an anthology of homoerotic short stories by an unknown author published in the late Ming dynasty.

== Contents ==
Bian er chai comprises four short stories that revolve around homosexual relationships; each story is five chapters long. "Qingzhen ji" (情贞纪) or "A Story of Chaste Love" follows a member of the Hanlin Academy who poses as a student to seduce a boy; in "Qingxia ji" (情侠纪) or "A Story of Chivalric Love", a decorated soldier is seduced by a man; "Qinglie ji" (情烈纪) or "A Story of Sacrificing Love" explores the love life of a young male opera singer; and in "Qingqi ji" (情奇纪) or "A Story of Extraordinary Love", a young catamite is rescued from the brothel by an older lover, only to encounter further tribulations.

== Publication history ==
Bian er chai was written in classical Chinese by an anonymous writer using the pseudonym "The Moon-Heart Master of the Drunken West Lake" (醉西湖心月主人), (Note: Also "West Lake Besotted Moon Heart Master".) who is also believed to have written another homoerotic short story collection titled Yichun xiangzhi (宜春香質) or Fragrance of the Pleasant Spring, as well as a preface for Cu hulu (醋葫蘆), a novella about a shrewish wife. Surviving editions of Bian er chai also contain interlinear commentary by "The Daoist Master Haha What Can You Do About Fate" (奈何天呵呵道人). The novel was first published during the reign of the Chongzhen Emperor (1628–1644) by the obscure "Plowing the Mountain with a Brush Studio" (筆耕山房), and was later banned by the Qing government. Two extant editions of Bian er chai are known to exist: one is housed at the Beijing Municipal Library and the Tenri Central Library in Japan, while the other is held in the National Palace Museum in Taipei.
