= Lavender marriage =

Marriage to feign heterosexuality for both spouses

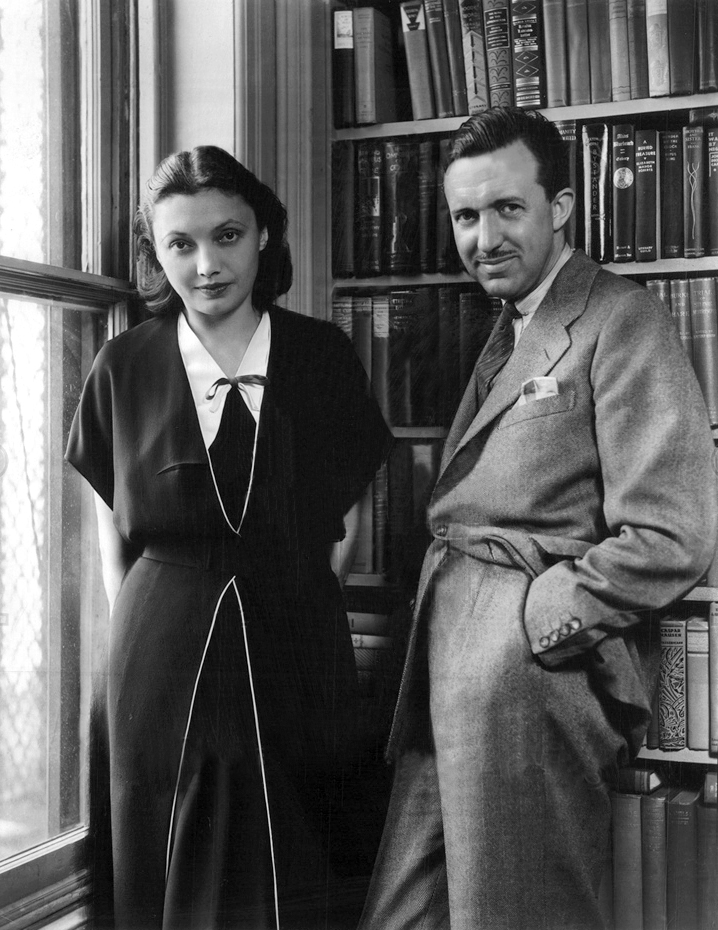
Lesbian actress Katharine Cornell and gay director Guthrie McClintic entered into a lavender marriage in 1921, amid the era of "morality clauses" in the profession.

A lavender marriage is a male–female mixed-orientation marriage undertaken as a marriage of convenience to conceal the socially stigmatized sexual orientation of one or both partners. The term dates from the early 20th century and was used almost exclusively to characterize certain public celebrities' marriages in the first half of the 20th century, primarily before World War II, when public attitudes made it almost impossible for an openly homosexual person to pursue a public career, notably in the Hollywood film industry. The phrase appears in print at least as early as 1991, but lavender's association with homosexuality dates to the 1920s, described as the decade when "The lavender marriage seems to have come into its own in Hollywood".

== In the Anglosphere ==
With the inclusion of morality clauses in Hollywood actors' contracts in the 1920s, some closeted stars entered into marriages of convenience to protect their reputations and preserve their careers. A noteworthy exception that demonstrates the precariousness of being openly homosexual was that of William Haines, whose career came to a sudden end at the age of 35. He refused to end his relationship with his partner, Jimmy Shields, and get married at the direction of his employer, Metro-Goldwyn-Mayer. Some companies withheld pay from employees found in breach of these clauses. Universal Film Company justified their actions by labeling the actors' behavior as unacceptable, including not only having sexual/romantic relationships with the same sex, but even the simple admission of being attracted to the same sex. With their livelihoods on the line, many homosexual actors felt they had no choice but to enter into lavender marriages. Lavender marriages also helped preserve the public's image of a celebrity (which, in turn, kept revenue flowing for studios), especially if they were famous for their looks or sex appeal. The end of the 20th century brought about a change, particularly after the 1969 Stonewall riots. Lavender marriages between celebrities became less common because of this.

The term lavender marriage has been used to characterize the following couples/individuals:

- The English broadcaster and journalist Nancy Spain considered entering a lavender marriage to disguise her relationship with Joan Werner Laurie, a magazine and book editor.
- Actor Rock Hudson, troubled by rumors that Confidential magazine was planning to expose his homosexuality, married Phyllis Gates, a young woman employed by his agent, in 1955. Gates insisted until the time of her death that she had had no idea the marriage was anything other than legitimate.
- Actress-director Sondra Locke married gay sculptor Gordon Leigh Anderson in 1967, and remained married to him until she died in 2018. Locke only actively bearded for Anderson during the first few years of their marriage, and eventually said that they had never consummated it. Although the spouses were living together at the time of Locke's death, both had engaged in long-term extramarital affairs throughout their 51-year union, notably Locke's 1975 to 1989 cohabitation with Clint Eastwood.
- American theater actress and producer Katharine Cornell married stage director Guthrie McClintic in 1921. She appeared only in productions he directed, and they lived together in their Manhattan townhouse until his death in 1961.
- Swedish Hollywood actor Nils Asther and vaudeville entertainer Vivian Duncan had a brief marriage of convenience that resulted in one child; Asther was a well known homosexual who had a relationship with actor/stuntman Kenneth DuMain.

Although lavender marriages are typically associated with homosexual celebrities, people of all backgrounds have used them for protection and convenience. Some individuals have found solace on websites where they can express discontent about their marriages of convenience, but not many have talked about their experience outside of the internet, apart from an article in The Guardian in November 2019, asking individuals to share their reasons for marrying for convenience. In November 2017, an article was published by the BBC about marriages of convenience in Asian LGBTQ+ communities in the UK.

The BBC article and its participants refer to a "marriage of convenience" rather than a lavender marriage, but they are still referring to a marriage that hides one partner's sexuality or that of both. Individuals reported that family expectations and keeping up an image were some of many reasons they had a marriage of convenience. Awemir Iqbal, a gay man from Pakistan, residing in West Yorkshire, stated that he understood why people had a marriage of convenience. The fear of tarnishing the family name or being disowned if their sexuality were discovered, led some to enter into one of these marriages. There are groups that exist, namely "Karma Nirvana", with the goal of supporting individuals (including homosexuals) who wish to escape forced marriages. Karma Nirvana's founder, Jasvinder Sanghera, says there are likely more marriages of convenience than are reported. Websites such as Mocmatch, Saathinight, and Al-Jannah are places where individuals can find partners to partake in a marriage of convenience.

== In the Sinosphere ==
Lavender marriages are known as Xinghun (nominal marriage) with the non-homosexual partner in the marriage being called Tongqi or Tongfu in China, where same-sex marriages or the LGBTQ+ community are not usually accepted. During the Chinese New Year, people travel home to celebrate with their families; however, young people also have to worry about pressures surrounding marriage (Cui Hun) and having children. For homosexual Chinese, societal pressure to enter into and maintain a heterosexual relationship can be so profound that they often turn to lavender marriages or "cooperative [marriages]". Some gay men and lesbians choose to marry each other to meet societal and parental expectations and ease some pressure. Many couples report that the lavender marriages do more harm than good if individuals deny themselves the expression of their sexuality outside of the marriage.

Cooperative marriages between gay men and lalas in urban China demonstrate how traditional gender expectations continue to influence marital dynamics, even while the marriage itself challenges conventional ideas about sexuality. Although these marriages allow homosexual individuals to partially navigate familial pressure in order to be perceived as a heterosexual couple, women may still face expectations associated with being a wife in China, such as taking care of domestic responsibilities, having children, and caring for their husbands' families and in-laws. These expectations reflect traditional gender roles in which women are often expected to assume responsibility for maintaining family relationships and providing care for children and older relatives. While gay men have more freedom to live as they please within a lavender marriage, lalas are left to negotiate these expectations while also attempting to maintain their own identities. Consequently, lalas bear a disproportionate share of family obligations, as gay men most often place their personal interests and pursuits above their responsibilities within their families.

For some couples, having children fulfills familial and societal expectations surrounding reproduction, and some subsequently divorce after meeting this expectation. Other couples, however, remain married and develop supportive relationships that allow them to navigate family pressures while also maintaining their identities. These different outcomes demonstrate that cooperative marriages can serve not only as a response to social expectations, but also as a practical arrangement through which LGBTQ+ individuals negotiate family responsibilities and personal autonomy. While these marriages challenge the assumption that marriage must be based on heterosexual attraction or romantic love, they do not necessarily dismantle the realities of traditional gender roles. Instead, the unequal distribution of domestic and caregiving responsibilities illustrates how expectations surrounding women's roles within the family can persist, even when conventional assumptions about sexuality are challenged.

A dating app called "Queers" was developed specifically for forming lavender marriages between homosexuals in China to help alleviate external pressures to enter heterosexual marriages. However, it was discontinued as it was not profitable. Despite this, former members continue to approach the app's founder, Liao Zhuoying, for matchmaking help with partners of the opposite sex.

== See also ==
- Beard (companion)
- Boston marriage
- He never married
- Hollywood marriage
- Mariage blanc
- Sham marriage
