= Cu hulu =

17th-century Chinese novel

- Original title: 醋葫蘆
- Language: Chinese
- Publication date: Early 17th-century
- Publication place: China (Ming dynasty)
- Media type: Print

Cu hulu
- Traditional Chinese: 醋葫蘆
- Simplified Chinese: 醋葫芦
- Literal meaning: vinegar calabash
Transcriptions
Standard Mandarin
- Hanyu Pinyin: Cù húlu
- IPA: [tsʰû xǔlu]

Titles page of Cu hulu from a printed edition, from the Peking University

Pages from a printed edition, from the National Archives of Japan

Cu hulu (Chinese: 醋葫蘆), translated into English as The Jealous Wife, is a Chinese novel written in the Ming dynasty by an unknown author.

== Plot ==
Having unsuccessfully tried for 40 years to conceive with her henpecked husband Cheng Gui (成珪), Dushi (都氏) finally permits him to have a concubine. Unfortunately, Cheng finds a woman with an "impenetrable vagina". After discovering that Cheng is having an affair with their maidservant, Dushi flogs her to apparent death. However, the woman survives and Cheng arranges for her to stay with his friend. She subsequently gives birth to a boy, while Dushi is cheated of her money by her godson and sent to Hell. Dushi eventually repents and makes amends with her maidservant.

== Publication history ==
Comprising 20 chapters, the novel was written by an unknown author using the pseudonym "Fucijiao zhu" (伏雌教主), variously translated into English as "Bishop of the Women-Taming Sect", "Master of Female Submission", "Master of the Doctrine of Subduing Women", or "The Founder of the Teaching on Capitulation to Women", while the "Moon-Heart Master of the Drunken West Lake" (醉西湖心月主人) wrote a preface to Cu hulu. The novel was published sometime between 1639 and 1640 by the publishing house Bigeng shanfang (筆耕山房). An original printed edition is housed in the National Archives of Japan.

== Analysis ==
The title Cu hulu (醋葫蘆) literally means "Calabash of Vinegar", recalling a Chinese expression for being jealous: "eating vinegar" (chī cù 吃醋). The protagonist of Cu hulu is a shrew whose surname, Dù (都), is a homophone for the Chinese word for jealousy (妒 dù). According to Yenna Wu, the "elaborate descriptions of tortures in the underworld" in Cu hulu were inspired by similar scenes in Stories to Caution the World by Feng Menglong. Keith McMahon suggests that the author intended for Cu hulu to be an "attack on polygamy".

Illustrations of scenes from the novel
