= Pan Zhang & Wang Zhongxian =

Ancient Chinese story

- Country: China
- Language: Chinese

Publication

The story of Pan Zhang & Wang Zhongxian is first recorded in a Song dynasty collection of tales called Anthology Of Tales From Records Of The Taiping Era (Chinese: 太平廣記). Text and story date back to the late Zhou or rather Warring States period. The kingdom of Chu as Pan Zhang's place of origin and that of Wu as Wang Zhongxian's native place are only archaic and literary references to present day Hunan and southern Jiangsu. This text has been misdated by Ameng from Wu, the compiler of On the Cut sleeve (Chinese: 断袖篇; pinyin: Duanxiupian) in 1909, and this error has gone unchecked ever since, including in Bret Hinsch's Passions of the Cut sleeve. Zhang Jie (Chinese: 张杰) sets things right in his An ambiguous course, a History of homosexuality in Ancient China, p. 151 (Chinese: 暧昧的历程，中国古代同性恋史; pinyin: Aimei de Licheng Zhongguo gudai tongxinglian shi) when he ascribes this story to the Three kingdoms and Six Dynasties period. The story states that "their love was like that between husband and wife" (Chinese: 情若夫妇).

It involves a beautiful writer named Pan Zhang (Chinese: 潘章) who becomes widely known for his bearing and looks. One of the male students who comes to learn from him is Wang Zhongxian (Chinese: 王仲先), and the two fall in love at first sight. They form a domestic partnership for the rest of their lives, during which they are described as "affectionate as husband and wife, sharing the same coverlet and pillow with unbounded intimacy for one another". Each of the couple dies at the same time, and the grieving local populace buries them at the peak of Mount Luofu. A tree miraculously grows from the spot, with its twigs growing to embrace each other.

== See also ==
- Achilles and Patroclus
- David and Jonathan
- Homosexuality in China
- Same-sex marriage
