= Mi Zixia =

Courtier and companion of Duke Ling of Wey

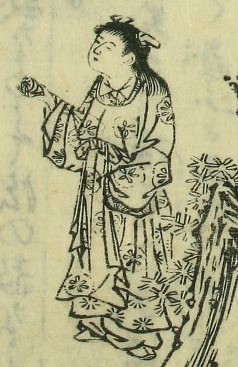
Mi Zixia as depicted in Ehon kojidan (1714) by Tachibana Morikuni

Mi Zixia (Chinese: 彌子瑕; pinyin: Mí Zǐxiá, sometimes written as Mízi Xiá) was a figure from the Zhou dynasty period of China. He was first recorded in the work Han Feizi, by Legalist philosopher Han Fei, as the companion of the historical figure Duke Ling of Wey. Mi Zixia was a contemporary of Confucius, and Mencius records that the two met.

== Name ==
Mi Zixia's original surname was Ji, and his personal name was Mou. He took the surname Mi from the land where he had been enfeoffed. Zixia was his courtesy name.

Chinese textual sources use varying versions of the name to refer to Mi Zixia. The Han Feizi uses both the forms 彌子瑕 and Mizi (彌子); Mencius uses the shorter form 彌子. Here, zi (子), added after the surname Mi, is a respectful form of address. In the Shuo Yuan, both 彌子瑕 and simply Zixia (子瑕) are used, demonstrating that Zixia was his courtesy name.

Mi Zixia's name has also been romanised in various ways. Burton Watson, in his translation of the Han Feizi, gave it as Mi Zixia. Mark Stevenson and Wu Cuncun, translating the honorific zi (子) as "Squire", write:

[...] the rather stuffy rendering of his name as Mi Zi Xia (here Squire Mi Xia, Squire Mi) reflected his distant connection to Wei royalty.

Bret Hinsch, in his book Passions of the Cut Sleeve (1990), translates the name as Mizi Xia. Hinsch refers to this as a correction, but does not elaborate further on the reason for this choice.

== The "bitten peach" and cultural legacy ==
Mi Zixia was the favored courtier of Duke Ling because of his beauty. When Mi Zixia got news that his mother was ill, he forged an order from the Duke to use a ducal carriage to travel quickly to see her, and was praised for his filial piety. Another time, Mi Zixia bit into an especially delicious peach and gave the remainder to the Duke as a gift so he could taste it as well. Both acts ingratiated him further with the ruler. However, once Mi Zixia's looks faded, the Duke turned against him, claiming he stole the carriage and then insulted the Duke by offering him a half-eaten peach.

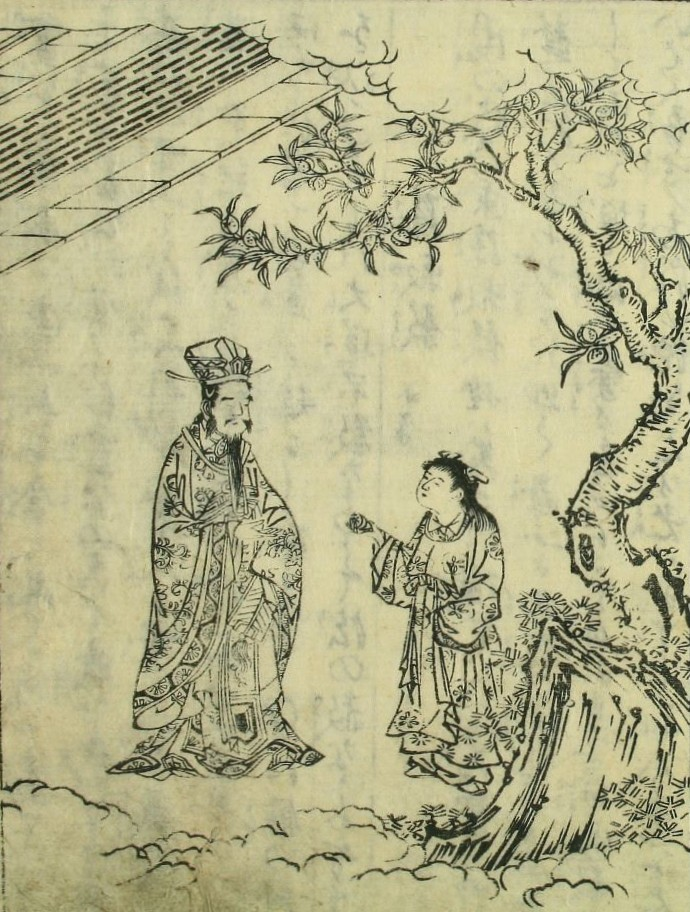
Mi Zixia offering a bitten peach to Duke Ling of Wey

Han Fei's primary goal in telling the story was to caution courtiers against getting too close to fickle rulers, but in later Chinese literature Mi Zixia became more alluded to for his beauty and his homosexuality. The phrase "bitten peach" became a byword for homosexuality and Mi Zixia became a byword for a young man desired as a sexual partner. Similar allusions would be later be applied to the "passion of the cut sleeve" and the Han dynasty courtier Dong Xian.

The Liang dynasty poet Liu Zun wrote, "Favors of the cut sleeve are generous,/ Love of the half-eaten peach never dies," confident that any educated person reading the poem would know exactly to whom he alluded. The earliest extant Chinese document to address homosexuality, the "Poetical Essay on the Supreme Joy" by Bo Xingjian, lists Mi Zixia amongst the famous examples of homosexuality: "Mizi Xia shared a peach with his lord".

By the 12th century, male companions no longer tended to wield great power at the ducal or imperial courts, and the name Mi Zixia had become associated with common male prostitutes. The narrowing of gender roles under the Qing dynasty and the influence of homophobic attitudes from the West would eventually make mention of "the bitten peach" completely taboo. In 1910, during a time of loosened censorship, Mi Zixia's story was included in the 80-volume compilation Xiangyan congshu or "Collected writings on fragrant elegance", alongside other writings on sexuality that had been proscribed during the Qing dynasty. Nonetheless, by 1990, scholar Bret Hinsch wrote that Mi Zixia and Dong Xian had "[lost] their place as famed icons of male love," and the homosexual tradition they represented was mostly unknown inside China.

== Encounter with Confucius ==
During Confucius's period of exile from his home state of Lu, he visited Wey and sought an audience with Duke Ling. Mencius records that Mi Zixia's wife was the sister of Confucius's disciple Zilu's wife. As such, Mi Zixia told Zilu that, should Confucius become his guest, he would be sure to become the Prime Minister of Wey. Confucius, however, told Zilu that whether or not he became Prime Minister was a matter of fate. Instead of staying with Mi Zixia, he let the more righteous Chief Counsellor, Yan Chouyou, host him.
