= Tongqi =

Chinese women who have married gay men

- Chinese: 同妻
Transcriptions
Standard Mandarin
- Hanyu Pinyin: tóngqī
- IPA: [tʰʊ̌ŋ.tɕʰí]
Yue: Cantonese
- Jyutping: tung4 cai1

Tongfu
- Chinese: 同夫
Transcriptions
Standard Mandarin
- Hanyu Pinyin: tóngfū
- IPA: [tʰʊ̌ŋ.fú]
Yue: Cantonese
- Jyutping: tung4 fu1

Tongqi (Chinese: 同妻; pinyin: Tóngqī; Mandarin pronunciation: [tʰʊ̌ŋ.tɕʰí]) is the neologism for Chinese women who have married gay men. Similarly, tongfu (Chinese: 同夫; pinyin: Tóngfū; Mandarin pronunciation: [tʰʊ̌ŋ.fú]) is the corresponding neologism for Chinese men who have married lesbian women. Liu Dalin, among the first sexologists in mainland China, estimated that 90% of gay men in China marry a heterosexual woman. By comparison, 15–20% of gay men married women in the United States as of 2010. Sexologist and sociologist Li Yinhe believes there are 20 million male homosexuals in China, of whom 80% marry women.

Tongzhi (a Chinese term for gay men) and Lalas (a Chinese term for lesbians) have arrangements known as cooperative marriages. According to an article by Stephanie Yingyi Wang called "When Tongzhi Marry: Experiments of Cooperative Marriage between Lalas and Gay Men in Urban China," these marriages are often the "solution for Tongzhi, especially for those in smaller cities, rural areas, and ethnic minority areas with fewer resources and more pressure to conform." She is saying that cooperative marriages provide a way for these individuals to meet the societal expectations that they have without giving up who they are or their personal identity. Even though Tongzhi and Lalas have different responsibilities within the cooperative marriage, they work together to find that balance between family obligations and their personal identities. Wang tells readers that "a large number of gay men and lalas are experimenting with new ways of being together, maintaining relationships with their families and friends, and defining who they are as tongzhi in China." These marriages demonstrate how LGBTQ individuals are finding new ways to navigate their cultural expectations, while keeping and defining their identities in their own way.

Gay Chinese men are under social pressure to marry and produce a male heir to continue the family line, as Confucian writers such as Mencius have placed a strong emphasis on this. Until 2016, the one-child policy put additional pressure on these gay Chinese men to pass down their family name. Women are also forced into these relationships due to the fear of becoming leftover women, and also face pressure to start a family.

Because tongqi often face such extreme difficulties, such as physical and emotional abuse from their husbands, they have developed coping strategies and have found places where they are understood and supported by others, such as online support groups. However, there are very few ways for tongqi to find the support they need outside of these groups, meaning that finding a way to permanently reduce these marriages is crucial.

== Etymology ==
The word combines 同 tong from 同性戀 (tongxinglian 'homosexuality') or 同志 (tongzhi, a slang term for 'gay') with 妻 qi ('wife'). Similarly, tongfu (同夫) combines 同 tong with 夫 fu ('husband').

== Life ==
Very few of the women who enter into these marriages are aware that their spouses are gay. Many women have turned to social media because it allows them to maintain anonymity while expressing their feelings about being married to gay men. The majority of these women worry more about the social stigma of being divorced in Chinese society than they do about being in a loveless marriage. For the men, the shame of being stigmatized as homosexual causes them to enter these marriages in the first place. In addition to the emotional toll of being married to a man who does not desire them physically, nearly 90% of these women suffer physical abuse and "sexual apathy" from their husbands. Many women who are married to gay men in China are dependent on the men for financial survival. Even with a divorce, they can be left with social and financial hardships. Only around 30% of tongqi marriages end in divorce, according to a recent survey. Divorce laws in China do not allow women to seek a dissolution of marriage from their husbands if they are gay.

Tongqi also struggle because of the lack of understanding they face from both widespread Chinese society and their families. Even if tongqi find out about their husbands' sexuality and demand a divorce, their families often call their behavior and actions unreasonable, leading to additional problems with their senses of identity. As mentioned above, they also deal with struggles when trying to divorce their husbands, as they are unable to produce evidence of cheating since the Chinese government does not officially recognize same-sex infidelity as cheating or cause for a divorce. Even if they continue with divorce proceedings, it is probable that the husbands will gain custody of their children, since courts will often favor the parent that has greater financial stability, meaning tongqi often don't file for divorce for fear of losing their children and money. Finally, tongqi are at a much higher risk for both physical and emotional problems, such as sexual health issues, partner violence, mental health problems, and marriage dissatisfactions.

After tongqi realize that their husbands are gay, there are many types of assimilation and accommodation practices that they have used to regain control of their lives and their senses of identity. Both aggressive and assertive accommodation practices have been used by tongqi in order to assert their dominance and seek permanent changes. Often, the goal of accommodation for these tongqi was to find better lives and empower themselves, but many also expected their husbands could simply change and become loving partners, showing the challenges that arise from a lack of education surrounding homosexuality. However, many have used assimilation tactics instead, in an effort to carry on with their marriages in a somewhat content way, despite the challenges that they sometimes faced with having indifferent husbands.

== Causes ==
Within China, there is much stigma that surrounds the idea of being gay, meaning that many men do not want to come out for fear of facing political, social, and cultural discrimination. This leads men to enter into relationships with straight women, since it is easier for them to marry women than to come out as gay. In addition to this, there is also pressure on these men to continue their family bloodlines, causing them to enter into relationships with women only to please their families and have children. Many even plan to divorce their wives after the baby is delivered, meaning that tongqi have to then deal with the stigma of being divorced, often without even knowing why or if they did something wrong.

However, there are also reasons that straight women jump into marriages with gay men. Because the fear of becoming a leftover woman is so great and there is such a high emphasis on family values for Chinese women, many enter relationships and marriages very quickly in order to find a partner within a certain time frame. They also do not have access to education explaining sexuality and homosexuality due to stigma within China, meaning that they often do not know any better when entering relationships with homosexual men.

== Coping strategies ==
One of the most important ways that tongqi learn to cope with their situations is through the usage of online support groups. Since Chinese society and the people that these tongqi are close to often do not recognize the issues that they deal with, they have found solace in support groups with other people who have gone through similar experiences. This can give them additional confidence within their own identity and lead them to take a stand against their husbands and file for divorces. Organizations like the China Wives of Gay Men Mutual Aid Studio provide ways to raise awareness about tongqi and homosexuality within China in an effort to protect tongqi rights and reduce the number of people that deal with these issues. However, despite the strong influence that these support groups can have on the lives of tongqi, they are essentially the only resource that tongqi have, since there are no official organizations to support them. This can further lead to stigmatization and victimization, meaning that many have realized the importance of looking for ways to permanently change the Chinese government's policies.

== Changes ==
A lot of these women are speaking out against China's policy against same sex marriage beyond chat rooms. Recently, tongqi have been seen marching in Hong Kong's gay rights parade to bring visibility to their plight. A new trend among Chinese gay men and lesbian is arrangements called cooperation marriages, where they marry each other publicly while living with a same sex partner in private. There are services which are available to assist in the matching of gay men to lesbians for the purposes of marriage. Research has been conducted about the plight of tongqi by the Harbin Institute of Technology for the first time that encourages the acceptance of gays, to reduce the number of women subjected to these marriages.

== See also ==
- Beard (companion)
- Lavender marriage
- Religion and homosexuality § Confucianism
- Fag hag
