= Anna Gustafsson Chen =

Swedish translator and sinologist (born 1965)

- 陈安娜
- Anna Gustafsson Chen, at Swecon in Stockholm 2026.
- Born: January 18, 1965 (age 61); Sweden
- Education: Stockholm University; Lund University
- Occupation: Translator
- Spouse: Chen Maiping
- Children: 1
- Writing career
- Language: Swedish, Chinese
- Period: 1993–present
- Genres: Novel, children's literature
- Notable works: To Live; Chronicle of a Blood Merchant; Red Sorghum; Life and Death Are Wearing Me Out

Anna Gustafsson Chen (simplified Chinese: 陈安娜; traditional Chinese: 陳安娜; pinyin: Chén ānnà; born 18 January 1965) is a Swedish literary translator and sinologist. She is notable for translating the work of Mo Yan (the 2012 Nobel Prize in Literature winner) into Swedish. Her translations are directly tied to Mo Yan becoming the first Chinese person to win the Nobel Prize for Literature. She has translated over 20 other notable works including the writing of Yu Hua and Su Tong.

== Biography ==
Chen was born in Sweden in 1965. She entered Stockholm University in 1985, studying Chinese language and Chinese Literature under Göran Malmqvist. She earned a doctorate in Chinese language and literature from Lund University in 1997. After graduation, Chen worked in Stockholm International Library as an administrator.

== Translations from Chinese ==
- Breaking the Barriers: Chinese Literature Facing the World. Olof Palmes internationella centrum, 1997.
- Eileen Chang, Ett halvt liv av kärlek (Half a Lifelong Romance 半生缘), Atlantis 2019.
- Chen Ran, Privatliv (Private life 私人生活), Tranan 2012.
- Chi Zijian, På floden Arguns södra strand (The Last Quarter of the Moon 额尔古纳河的右岸), Wanzhi 2018.
- Chun Sue, Beijing doll (北京娃娃). Bra Böcker, 2005.
- Han Shaogong, Maqiao (Dictionary of Maqiao 马桥词典) Albert Bonniers förlag, 2009.
- Hong Ying, K – en kärlekshistoria (K: The art of love 英国情人). Norstedts, 2001.
- Hong Ying. Flodens dotter (Daughter of the river 饥饿的女儿). Norstedts, 1999.
- Hong Ying. Svekets sommar (Summer of betrayal 背叛之夏). Norstedts, 1998.
- Jia Pingwa, Lyckan (Happy 高兴), Wanzhi 2014.
- Jia Pingwa, Makalös (Broken Wings 极花), Wanzhi 2019.
- Jia Pingwa, Opera (Shaanxi Opera 秦腔), Wanzhi 2016.
- Liu Xiaobo, Jag har inga fiender, jag hyser inget hat (I have no enemies, I feel no hate 我没有敌人), Weyler förlag, 2011.
- Liu Zhenyun, Barn av sin tid (吃瓜时代的儿女们), Wanzhi 2019.
- Liu Zhenyun, Ett ord i rättan tid (Someone to talk to 一句顶一万句), Wanzhi, 2016.
- Liu Zhenyun, Processen (I didn't kill my husband 我不是潘金莲), Wanzhi, 2014.
- Liu Zhenyun, Tillbaka till 1942 (Back to 1942 温故一九四二), Wanzhi 2017.
- Ma Jian, Rött damm (Red dust 红尘) Fischer & Co, 2007.
- Ma Jian, Nudelbagaren (The noodle maker 拉面着) Fischer & Co, 2007.
- Mo Yan, Grodor (Frogs 蛙), Tranan 2015.
- Mo Yan. Det röda fältet (Red sorghum 红高梁家族). Tranan, 1997.
- Mo Yan. Vitlöksballaderna (The garlic ballads 天堂蒜台之歌). Tranan, 2001.
- Mo Yan, Ximen Nao och hans sju liv (Life and death are wearing me out 生死疲劳), Tranan 2012.
- Ren Xiaowen, Lägret (岛上). Wanzhi 2015.
- Solskenet i munnen. 10 noveller (Sunshine in the mouth. 10 short stories 嘴辰中的阳光:十部短篇小说). Tranan, 2003.
- Su Tong. Den röda lyktan (Raise the Red Lantern 大红灯笼高高挂, original title Wives and Concubines 妻妾成群). Tranan, 1993.
- Su Tong, Binu och den stora muren (Binu and the Great Wall 碧奴) Albert Bonniers förlag, 2008.
- Su Tong, Ris (Rice 米), Wanzhi, 2016.
- Wei Hui. Shanghai Baby (上海宝贝). Forum, 2002.
- Wei Jingsheng. Modet att stå ensam (The courage to stand alone魏京生狱中书信集). Bokförlaget DN, 1998.
- Xiao Bai, Avspärrningen (Sealed Off 封锁), Nirstedt Litteratur 2019.
- Xiao Rundcrantz, Röd åklagare (Red prosecutor 红色检察官). Bokförlaget DN, 2006.
- Hsing Yun, Mellan okunskap och upplysning (Between ignorance and enlightenment 迷悟之间)). B4Press, 2005.
- Yan Lianke, Drömmar om byn Ding (Dream of Ding Village 丁庄梦), Atlantis 2013.
- Yan Lianke, Explosionskrönika (The Explosion Chronicles 炸裂志), Atlantis 2019.
- Yan Lianke, Upptäck romanen (发现小说), Wanzhi 2019.
- Yan Lianke, De fyra böckerna (The Four Books 四书), 2017.
- Yan Lianke, Lenins kyssar (Lenin's kisses受活), Atlantis 2015.
- Yang Lian & Ai Weiwei, Konst och människa (Art and Man 还原艺术的人性), Rámus 2019.
- Yang Lian, Koncentriska cirklar (Concentric Circles 同心圆), Wanzhi 2018.
- Yu Hua, Att leva (To Live 活着). Ruin, 2006.
- Yu Hua, Kina med tio ord (China in ten words 十个词汇中的中国), Natur och kultur 2013.
- Yu Hua, Handelsman i blod (Blood merchant许三观卖血记) Ruin, 2007.
- Yu Hua, Rop i duggregn (Cries in the drizzle 在细雨中呼喊), Wanzhi 2017.
- Zhang Wei, Det gamla fartyget (The old ship 古船), Jinring 2013.
- Zhang Xinxin & Sang Ye. Leva i Kina (Living in China) (some chapters). Forum, 1988.
- Zhang Yueran, Båten (The Boat 船), Tidskriften Karavan 2018.

=== Children's books ===
- Cao Wenxuan, Fjäderns resa (The Feather羽毛), Hjulet 2014.
- Jimmy Liao, Stjärnenatt (Starry, starry night 星空), Mirando 2013.
- Jimmy Liao, Skogens hemligheter (Secrets of the forest 森林里的秘密), Mirando 2014.
- Jimmy Liao, Färgernas ljud (The Sound of Colors 地下铁, Mirando 2016.
- Jimmy Liao, När månen glömde (When the Moon Forgot 月亮忘记了), Mirando 2019.
- Liu Hsu-Kung, Är du min bror (The Orange Coloured Horse 橘色的马), Natur och kultur 2018.
- Yin Jianling, Sommarsång (Summer song 夏日和声), JH Publishers 2011.

== Translations from other languages ==
- Corinne Debaine-Francfort. Återupptäckten av det gamla Kina (La redécouverte de la Chine ancienne). Berghs, 1999.
- Ha Jin. Två kärlekar (Waiting). Forum, 2001.
- Johann S Lee, Tid för vila (Quiet time), Tranan 2015.
- Kopano Matlwa, Coconut, Tranan, 2010.
- O Thiam Chin, Aldrig bättre (Never been better), Tranan 2013.
- Qiu Xiaolong, De röda råttorna (A Case of Two Cities) Ordfront, 2008.
- Stephen Karcher. I Ching. Forum, 1998.
- FAN Xiulan. Hälsans tao. Det långa livets hemlighet (The Tao of Health). Svenska Förlaget, 2004.
- FAN Xiulan. Qigong enligt Biyun. Låt livskraften återvända (Qigong according to Biyun). Svenska Förlaget, 2000.

=== Children's books ===
- Nanoy Rafael & Sergio Bumatay III, Naku, nakuu, nakuuu! (Naku, nakuu, nakuuu!), Trasten 2012.
- Jili Jiang, Flickan med den röda halsduken (Red Scarf Girl) Berghs, 1999.
- Christian Epanya, Papa Diops taxi (Le taxi-brousse de Papa Diop), Trasten, 2006.
- To Hoai, En syrsas memoarer (Diary of a cricket/De men phieu luu ky) Trasten, 2006.
- Ingrid Mennen & Niki Daly, Ashraf från Afrika (Ashraf from Africa), Trasten, 2009.
- Mhlobo Jadezweni, Tshepo Mde är tillräckligt lång (Tshepo Mde is tall enough), Trasten, 2010.

== Personal life ==
Chen married Chen Maiping, a writer, poet, translator and publisher. The couple has a son.
