= Red scarf (disambiguation) =

The Red scarf is a symbol of the international Pioneer Movement.

Red scarf may also refer to:

- Red Scarf (company), a lifestyle website aimed at Chinese citizens resident in the UK
- Red Scarf (film), a 1964 South Korean aviation action film set during the Korean War
- Red scarf, a plain red scarf depicted in the song and short film "All Too Well" by Taylor Swift
- Red Scarf (WeiBird song) (Chinese: 如果可以), a theme song of the movie, Till We Meet Again (Chinese: 月老), sung by WeiBird, released on November 5, 2021

== See also ==
- The Girl with the Red Scarf, a 1978 Turkish film
- The Girl with the Red Scarf (TV series), a 2011-2012 Turkish television series
- Red Scarf Girl, an English language memoir of the Cultural Revolution
- Honglingjin Park, also known as Red Scarf Park, a park in Beijing
