= Hongfen =

Hongfen may refer to:

- Petulia's Rouge Tin, a 1991 Chinese novel by Su Tong (the Chinese name is Hongfen)
- Blush (1995 film), a 1995 Chinese film based on Su Tong's novel (the Chinese name is also Hongfen)
