= Peter Pan Prize =

Swedish children's literature award

The Peter Pan Prize (Swedish: Peter Pan-Prisets) was established in 2000 by IBBY Sweden and the Göteborg Book Fair. It is awarded annually "to a book for children or young adults of high quality in both literary and subject terms, satisfying one or more of the following criteria: (1) by an author previously unpublished or little known in Sweden; (2) from a country, language group or culture with limited representation in Sweden; (3) with content concerning children or young adults in less familiar countries and cultures less familiar to Swedish readers" Runner-up prizes are called Silver Stars (Swedish: Silverstjärna).

== Peter Pan Prize Winners ==
- 2019 Doften av ett hem (The Scent of a Home) - by Bonnie Sue Hitchcock
- 2018 Akissi och det flygande fåret (Akisssi and Flying Sheep) - by Marguerite Abouet and Mathieu Sapin
- 2017 Mitt år av längtan (My Year of Longing) - by Dasha Tolstikova
- 2016 Sabelles röda klänning (Sabelle's Red Dress) - by Marina Michaelidou-Kadi, illus. Daniela Stamatiadi
- 2015 Guji Guji (Guji Guji) - by Chih-Yuan Chen
- 2014 Världens ände (Everybody Jam) - by Ali Lewis, translated by Elisabeth Fredholm (Förlaget Opal)
- 2013 Naku, Nakuu, Nakuuu! - by Nanoy Rafael, illus. Sergio Bumatay III, translated by Anna Gustafsson Chen
- 2012 Ensam hemma (While We Were Out) - by Lee
- 2011 Ankomsten (The Arrival) - by Shaun Tan for translated from English (Kabusa Böcker)
- 2010 Makwelane och krokodilen (Makwelane and the Crocodile) - by Maria Hendricks, illus. Piet Grobler, translated by Ulla Forsén
- 2009 Den absolut sanna historien om mitt liv som halvtidsindian (The Absolutely True Diary of a Part-Time Indian) - by Sherman Alexie, translated by Ingela Jernberg
- 2008 Blunda och öppna ditt fönster (Vừa Nhắm Mắt Vừa Mở Cửa Sổ) [Open the Window with Closed Eyes] - by Nguyen Ngoc Thuan, translated by Hoai Anh Tran
- 2007 Kiffe Kiffe imorgon (Kiffe Kiffe demain) - by Faïza Guène, translated by Lotta Riad
- 2006 Long-longs nyår: en berättelse om den kinesiska vårfesten (Long-Long's New Year) - by Catherine Gower, illust. He Zhihong, translated by Lotta Riad
- 2005 Persepolis - by Marjane Satrapi, translated by Gabriella Theiler
- 2004 Över näktergalens golv (Across the Nightingale Floor) - by Lian Hearn, translated by Carla Wiberg
- 2003 Den osynliga flickan (The Breadwinner) - by Deborah Ellis, translated by Helena Ridelberg
- 2002 Alexis Kouros for På en ö i havet (On an Island in the Sea), translated by Janina Orlov (Alfabeta Bokförlag)
- 2001 Hipp, hurra för mormor (Hip, Hip, Hurray for Grandma) - by Cari Best, illus. Giselle Potter, translated by Barbro Lagergren
- 2000 Katies krig (Katie's War) - by Aubrey Flegg, translated by Gunilla Borén

== Shortlist 2020 ==
- Molnbullar – by Baek Heena (South Korea), translated by Johee Kim and Jonas Thelander
- Josefs vagga – by Jude Daly (South Africa), translated by Ulla Forsén
- Planeten Frank – by David Yoon (USA), translated by Carina Jansson
- Dubbel trubbel för Anna Hibiscus! – by Atinuke (Nigeria), illus. Lauren Tobia (UK), translated by Matilda Wallin
- Min pappa och jag – by Nari Hong (South Korea), translated by Anna Lärk Ståhlberg
- När månen glömde – by Jimmy Liao (Taiwan), translated by Anna Gustafsson Chen
- Ett hastigt rent rop – by Siobhan Dowd (Ireland), translated by Helena Ridelberg
- Landet Bomb; Landet Gräs – by Brane Mozetic, illus. Maja Kastelic (Slovenia), translated by Dolores Meden
- Bené – snabbare än den snabbaste hönan – by Eymard Toledo (Brazil), translated by Björn Eklund
- Fåglarnas here – by Rogério Andrade Barbosa, illus. Salmo Dansa (Brazil), translated by Birgitta Alm

== Awards 2019 ==
- Peter Pan Prize: Doften av ett hem - by Bonnie-Sue Hitchcock (USA), translated by Helena Hansson
- Silver Star: Paveen och buffertjejen [The Pave and the Buffer Girl] - by Siobhan Dowd, illus. Emma Shoard, translated by Helena Ridelberg
- Silver Star: Är du min bror? [Are you My Brother?] - by Liu Hsu-kung, translated by Anna Gustafsson Chen

== Awards 2018 ==
- Peter Pan Prize: Akissi och det flygande fåret [Akisssi and Flying Sheep] - by Marguerite Abouet and Mathieu Sapin
- Silver Star: The Great Story of a Small Line - by Serge Bloch (France), translated by Christo Burman
- Silver Star: Mouth of the Night - by Cristino Wapichana (Brazil), illus. Graça Lima, translated by Helena Vermcrantz

== Awards 2017 ==
- Peter Pan Prize: Mittår av längtan - by Dasha Tolstikova, translated by Karin Berg
- Silver star: Stopp! Ingen får passera! [Stop! No one is Allowed to Pass] - by Isabel Minhó Martins (Portugal), illus. Bernardo P. Carvalho, translated by Erik Titusson
- Silver star: Kanske ett äpple [Maybe an Apple] - by Shinsuke Yoshitake, translated by Yukiko Duke

== Awards 2016 ==
- Peter Pan Prize: Sabelles röda klänning [Sabelle's Red Dress] - by Marina Michaelidou-Kadi, illus. Daniela Stamatiadi
- Silver Star: Strong as a bear - by Katrin Stangl, translated from German
- Silver Star: Princess who did not like princes - by Alice Brière-Haquet and Lionel Larcheveqque, translated from French

== Awards 2015 ==
- Peter Pan Prize: Guji Guji [Guji Guji] - by Chih-Yuan Chen
- Silver Star: Malala - the words are her weapon - by Karen Legget Abouraya and L.C. Wheatley, translated by Ulla Forsén
- Silver Star: Wow what a party! - by Ana Maria Machado (Brazil) and Hélène Moreau, translated by Helena Vermcrantz

== Awards 2013 ==
- Peter Pan Prize: Naku, Nakuu, Nakuuu! - by Nanoy Rafael, illus. Sergio Bumatay III, translated by Anna Gustafsson Chen
- Silver Star: If there was a war in the Nordic countries - by Janne Teller, translated by Karin Nyman
- Silver Star: Djangon - by Lilla Piratförlaget and Levi Pinfold, translated by Emelie Andr

== Awards 2012 ==
- Peter Pan Prize: Ensam hemma (While We Were Out) - by Lee
- Silver Star: Streaks of Hope - by Box Sepetys, translated by Linda Erkelius
- Silver Star: Earth Children, children of heaven - by Choi Sukhee, translated by Ahryun Gustafsson

== Awards 2011 ==
- Peter Pan Prize: Ankomsten - by Shaun Tan, translated from English (The Arrival)
- Silver Star: Enchanted Fruit - by John Kilaka, translated by Britt Isaksson
- Silver Star: Peace Drums - by Meshack Asare, translated by Peter Törnqvist

== Awards 2010 ==
- Peter Pan Prize: Makwelane och krokodilen (Makwelane and the Crocodile), by Maria Hendricks, illus. Piet Grobler, translated by Ulla Forsén
- Silver Star: Ghost Train - by Rintaro Uchida, illus. Shiego Nishimura, translated by Asuka Ukai
- Silver Star: Ruby Red - by Linzi Ice Cream, translated by Helena Ridelberg

== Awards 2009 ==
- Peter Pan Prize: Den absolut sanna historien om mitt liv som halvtidsindian - by Sherman Alexie, translated by Ingela Jernberg
- Silver Star: Whimsical Mama Sambona - by Hermann Schulz, illus. Tobias Krejtschi, translated by Ulla Forsén
- Silver Star: Honey Flower - by Alice Veiria, translated by Helena and Per Erik Vermcrantz

== Awards 2008 ==
- Peter Pan Prize: Blunda och öppna ditt fönster - by 2008 Nguyen Ngoc Thuan, translated from Vietnamese (Vừa Nhắm Mắt Vừa Mở Cửa Sổ) [Open the Window with Closed Eyes] by Hoai Anh Tran
- Silver Star: Otroso - latest news from the underworld - by Graciela Montes, translated by Ann Karin Thorburn
- Silver Star: Purple and the Secret of the Rain - by David Convay and Jude Daly, translated by Ulla Forsén

== Awards 2007 ==
- Peter Pan Prize: Kiffe Kiffe imorgon - by Faïza Guène, translated by Lotta Riad
- Silver Star: Ängeln in the stairwell - by Kristin Steinsdóttir, illus. Halla Sólveig þorgeirdóttir, translated by John Swedenmark
- Silver Star: Pikkuhenki - the story of a very small witch - by Toon Tellegen, illus. Marit Törnqvist, translated by Signe Zeilich

== Awards 2006 ==
- Peter Pan Prize: Long-longs nyår: en berättelse om den kinesiska vårfesten - by Catherine Gower, illus. He Zhihong, translated by Lotta Riad (Förlaget Hjulet)
- Silver Star: With me, everything is okay - by Guus Kuijer, translated by Boerje Bohlin
- Silver Star: Death in a Nutshell - by Eric Maddern, illus. Paul Hess, translated by Ulla Forsén

== Awards 2005 ==
- Peter Pan Prize: Persepolis - by Marjane Satrapi, translated by Gabriella Theiler
- Silver Star: Pomelo are in love - by Ramona Badescu, illus. Benjamin Chaud, translated by Barbro Lindgren
- Silver Star: Rani & Sukh - by Bali Rai, translated by Katarina Jansson

== Awards 2004 ==
- Peter Pan Prize: Över näktergalens golv - by Lian Hearn, translated by Carla Wiberg
- Silver Star: Fresh Fish - by John Kilaka, translated by Britt Isaksson
- Silver Star: Stravaganza. The city of masks - by Mary Hoffman, translated by Lena Karlin
- Silver Star: The Dream of Palestine - by Randa Ghazy, translated by Olov Hyllienmark

== Awards 2003 ==
- Peter Pan Prize: Den osynliga flickan - by Deborah Ellis, translated by Helena Ridelberg
- Silver Star: (O) planned wedding - by Bali Rai, translated by Olov Hyllienmark
- Silver Star: The Lord of Thieves - by Cornelia Funke, translated by Gunilla Borén
- Silver Star: Grandpa's angel - by Jutta Bauer, translated by Monica Stein

== Awards 2002 ==
- Peter Pan Prize: På en ö i havet - by Alexis Kouros, translated by Janina Orlov
- Silver Star: Bat Summer - by Sarah Withrow, translated by Ann-Marie Ljungberg

== Awards 2001 ==
- Peter Pan Prize: Hipp, hurra för mormor - by Cari Best, illus. Giselle Potter (illustrator), translated by Barbro Lagergren
- Silver Star: Emma and the chalk princess - by Brigitte Minne, illus. Anne Westerduin, translated by Mary S Lund
- Silver Star: Fox and hare - by Sylvia Vanden Heede, illus. Thé Tjong-Khing, translated by Paul Wouters
- Silver Star: Ön in Fågelgatan - by Uri Orlev, translated by Carla Wiberg

== Awards 2000 ==
- Peter Pan Prize: Katies krig - by Aubrey Flegg, translated by Gunilla Borén
- Silver Star: Kwela Jamela. Queen of Africa - by Niki Daly, translated by Britt Isaksson
- Silver Star: A week full of Saturdays - by Paul Maar, translated by Gunilla Borén
- Silver Star: One Hole a Day - by Louis Sachar, translated by Peter Lindforss
