= A Loyal Character Dancer =

2002 novel by Qiu Xiaolong

- First edition
- Author: Qiu Xiaolong
- Language: English
- Series: Inspector Chen Cao
- Genre: Mystery
- Publisher: Soho Press
- Publication date: 2002 September 30
- Publication place: United States
- Media type: Print (hardback)
- Pages: 360 pp
- ISBN: 1-56947-301-3
- OCLC: 49805501
- Dewey Decimal: 813/.6 21
- LC Class: PS3553.H537 L69 2002
- Preceded by: Death of a Red Heroine
- Followed by: When Red Is Black

A Loyal Character Dancer is a 2002 detective novel by Qiu Xiaolong. The book is set in Shanghai and is the second to feature Chief Inspector Chen Cao. Qiu Xiaolong went on to publish several more novels featuring Chief Inspector Chen.

== Plot summary ==
One morning in the park by the Bund, Chief Inspector Chen finds a dead body with precisely 18 axe wounds. He decides to take up the case - however, he is also ordered to escort a U.S. Marshal (Catherine Rohn) and assist her with her investigation. In this case, it means going to look for the wife of a witness in a human-smuggling investigation who will not talk unless his wife is with him. Things are complicated by the fact that the woman has gone missing.

== Reception ==
Commentators enjoyed both the main character and the book's portrait of an evolving China. Kirkus Reviews said "Likable, admirable Chen makes a sturdy protagonist, but it’s China in transition—always interesting, often bewildering—that gets the star turn here." London Review of Books also found the portrait of China key to this novel and the whole series, with their analysis of misplaced nostalgia for the Cultural Revolution and focus on the "benign cultural force" of food. Similarly, Mystery Tribune praised the character of Chen Cao, "a poetry-quoting cop with integrity", but noted that "the main concern in the books is modern China itself. Each book features quotes from ancient and modern poets, Confucius, insights into Chinese cuisine, architecture, history, politics, herbology and philosophy as well as criminal procedure."
