= Don't Cry, Tai Lake =

2012 mystery novel by Qiu Xiaolon

- Author: Qiu Xiaolong
- Language: English
- Series: Inspector Chen Cao
- Genre: Mystery
- Publisher: Minotaur Books
- Publication date: 2012
- Pages: 272
- ISBN: 9780312550646
- Preceded by: The Mao Case (2009)
- Followed by: Enigma of China (2013)
- Website: us.macmillan.com/books/9781250021588/dont-cry-tai-lake

Don't Cry, Tai Lake is Qiu Xiaolong's seventh Inspector Chen Cao novel, folling after The Mao Case (2009). The novel, published in 2012 by Minotaur Books, explores concepts relating to character, poetry, Chinese society and culture, pollution, and food.

== Plot summary ==
Chief Inspector Chen Cao of the Shanghai Police Bureau is offered a week's vacation near Tai Lake. He mets Shanshan, a young, beautiful and honest environmental engineer.

The director of a chemical manufacturing plant responsible for Tai Lake water pollution is murdered. Jiang, an environmentalist and Shanshan are suspected.

So he decide to help sergeant Huang Kang of the Wuxi Police Bureau to solve the case.

== Characters ==
- Chief Inspector Chen Cao, Shanghai Police Bureau, poet and foodie
- Shanshan, environmental engineer
- Comrade Secretary Zhao, retired but one of the most influential figures in Beijing
- Liu Deming, the victim of the homicide, chemical factory CEO
- Fu Hao, chemical factory executive officer
- Mi, chemical factory assistant
- Uncle Wang, chef
- Huang Kang, Wuxi Police Bureau
- Jiang, environmentalist
- Ji Lun, Homeland Security
- Han Bing, Homeland Security

== Style ==
Qiu adapts the Classical Chinese storytelling style inserting poetry as a brief introduction and conclusion to a chapter. In addition to poetry, Qiu inserts popular Chinese idioms, historical allusions, philosophical aphorism and Maoist speeches. It has been criticized that these inclusions slow down the pace and intrude the suspense that is crucial for a detective story.

== Reviews ==
Booklist proffered Don't Cry, Tai Lake a starred review.

According to Kirkus Reviews, Don't Cry, Tai Lake is "peppered with poetry and told with clarity and elegance". They concluded that "its portrait of modern China is as intriguing as its slow-rolling whodunit".

Publishers Weekly acknowledged that "serendipity sometimes furthers the detective work", which they stated "won’t bother those for whom this mystery’s chief appeal is its insights into many of the contradictions of present-day China, a classless society where you have to be a high-ranking party cadre to gain free access to a park renowned for its scenic beauty—and where industry booms at the cost of severe water pollution."

Mark Schrieber, writing for The Japan Times, also reviewed the novel.

== Food ==
- Tai Lake Three Whites
- Wuxi fried spare ribs
- Jinhua ham
- Stinky tofu

== See also ==
- Natural environment
- Pollution
