= Henry O =

Chinese-American actor

- Born: Jiang Xireng (蒋锡礽); July 27, 1927 (age 99); Shanghai, China
- Occupation: Actor
- Years active: 1949–2013
- Spouse: Ying Chen
- Children: Jiang Ji-yong, Jiang Ji-yun and Ji-li Jiang

Chinese name
- Traditional Chinese: 歐亨利
- Simplified Chinese: 欧亨利
Transcriptions
Standard Mandarin
- Hanyu Pinyin: Ōu Hēnglì
- Bopomofo: ㄡ ㄏㄥ ㄌㄧˋ
- Gwoyeu Romatzyh: Ou Henglih
- Website: henryo.org

Henry O (simplified Chinese: 欧亨利; traditional Chinese: 歐亨利; pinyin: Ōu Hēnglì; born July 27, 1927) is a retired Chinese-American actor. He is the father of Ji-li Jiang, the author of Red Scarf Girl.

O was born in Shanghai in 1927 and attended British and American missionary schools in China. He worked as a stage actor in China before switching to film work after moving to the United States.

During the Cultural Revolution he was falsely accused of counter-revolutionary crimes and was detained and forced to do hard labour by the Chinese government.

== Personal life ==
O and his family left China and settled in the United States in the 1980s to take care of his daughter Ji-yun's children. Henry O is his stage named and is derived from O. Henry.

O resides in San Francisco area and is married to Ying Chen. They have three children including Jiang Ji-yong, Jiang Ji-yun and author Ji-li Jiang. O is fluent in both English and Mandarin Chinese.

== Filmography ==
Most of O's credits after 1983 are after his arrival to the United States.

=== Television ===
- The Sopranos (2006) – Monk #1 in episodes "Mayham" and "Join the Club"
- ER (2004) – Mr. Chen in episodes "White Guy, Dark Hair" and "Twas the Night"
- The West Wing (2000) – Jhin Wei in "Shibboleth"
- Marco Polo (1983) – astrologer

=== Film ===
- Premium Rush (2012) – Mr. Leung
- 2012 (2009) – Lama Rinpoche
- Rush Hour 3 (2007) – Master Yu
- A Thousand Years of Good Prayers (2007) – Mr Shi
- They Wait (2007) – Pharmacist
- Avatar (2004) – Uncle Hui
- Shanghai Noon (2000) – Royal Interpreter
- Romeo Must Die (2000) – Ch'u Sing, father of Han Sing
- Dragonheart: A New Beginning (2000) – Master Kwan
- Snow Falling on Cedars (1999) – Nagaishi
- Brokedown Palace (1999) – Emissary to Crown
- Red Corner (1997) – Procurator General Yang
- American Shaolin (1992) – Master San De
- The Last Emperor (1987) – the Lord Chamberlain
