= Inspector Chen =

Inspector Chen may refer to:

- Chief Inspector Chen Cao, a fictional character by Qiu Xiaolong
- Detective Inspector Chen, a fictional character by Liz Williams
