= Raise the Red Lantern (novella) =

1990 novel by Su Tong

- Cover of the edition published by Chunfeng Literature & Art Publishing House (春风文艺出版社) in Mainland China
- Author: Su Tong
- Original title: 妻妾成群 (Wives and Concubines)
- Translator: Michael S. Duke
- Language: Mandarin Chinese
- Publisher: Book: Yuan-Liou Publishing Co. (遠流出版公司)
- Publication date: 1989
- Publication place: China
- English publication date: 1993
- Media type: Print

Wives and Concubines
- Chinese: 妻妾成群
- Literal meaning: A drove of wives and concubines Crowd of Wives and Concubines, or A Profusion of Wives and Concubines
Transcriptions
Standard Mandarin
- Hanyu Pinyin: Qīqiè Chéngqún
- Wade–Giles: Ch'i^{1}-ch'ieh^{4} Ch'eng^{2}-chün^{2}

Raise the Red Lantern
- Traditional Chinese: 大紅燈籠高高掛
- Simplified Chinese: 大红灯笼高高挂
- Literal meaning: Raise high the red lanterns
Transcriptions
Standard Mandarin
- Hanyu Pinyin: Dà Hóng Dēnglóng Gāogāo Guà
- Wade–Giles: Ta^{4} Hung^{2} Teng^{1}-long^{2} Kao^{1}-kao^{1} Kua^{4}

Raise the Red Lantern (traditional Chinese: 大紅燈籠高高掛; simplified Chinese: 大红灯笼高高挂), originally known as Wives and Concubines (Chinese: 妻妾成群; pinyin: Qīqiè Chéngqún), is a 1990 novella by Su Tong, published by Yuan-Liou Publishing Co. (遠流出版公司), that describes a young woman, formerly a university student, whose mind is broken by the concubine system in 1930s China. It was adapted into the 1991 film, Raise the Red Lantern, by Zhang Yimou.

== Publication, title and translations ==
The publication that first housed the novel was the literary journal Shouhuo (traditional Chinese: 收穫; simplified Chinese: 收获; lit. 'Harvest'), and this publication happened in late 1989.

The first book edition of the novella, published in Taiwan, had the name Wives and Concubines. This publication happened in 1990, and it was a volume that also included the novella Nineteen Thirty-four Escapes. However, the name used in the second edition in Taiwan and in the Hong Kong edition became Raise the Red Lantern. Krist wrote that the use of Raise the Red Lantern by other editions was "presumably to ride on the movie's popularity". Sabina Knight (Chinese name: Chinese: 桑稟華; pinyin: Sāng Bǐnghuá), formerly known as Deirdre Sabina Knight, concurred, stating that the title change was "to ride the success of" the film. The Hong Kong edition was published in 1993 by Tiandi.

The novel was translated into English by Michael S. Duke, and this translation was published as a collection of stories by Su Tong, named Raise the Red Lantern: Three Novellas, published by William Morrow & Company in 1993. Duke used Hanyu Pinyin in his translation. He stated that he chose to romanize the names of male characters as such characters did not have important themes in their names. He chose to translate names of female characters as their names were "thematically important references to nature and the cycles of nature" as well as having the function to "delineate" said characters. Duke used frequent semicolons to try to keep Su Tong's practice of, in Duke's words, "very long multiple sentences marked with commas only", something uncommon in current Chinese literature. The other two included works in the compilation are Nineteen Thirty-four Escapes and Opium Family. Excerpts of the English-language translation were included in the 2016 anthology The Big Red Book of Modern Chinese Literature.

The French version, under the title Épouses et concubines, was translated by Annie Au Yeung and Françoise Lemoine, and published by Groupe Flammarion in 1992. The film had not yet been released in Europe when the French version was released. Later editions in French are a part of the imprint Le Livre de Poche of the publisher Hachette. The novella was published in German as Rote Lanterne ("Red Lantern"), by Goldmann, in 1992. The German translation was done from the French version, with assistance from Sinologists, instead of directly from the Chinese version. Ulrike Kloepfner, the editor, stated that there was not enough time to obtain the manuscript of the Chinese version as the publishers wished to release it when the film was released.

The Dutch translation, De rode lantaarn, published by Uitgeverij Contact, was released in 1994. The Italian translation, Mogli e concubine, was first published in 1992 by Theoria. Later Italian versions were published by Feltrinelli. The Japanese version, using the Wives and Concubines title (妻妾成群), was translated by Takumasa Senno (千野拓政 Senno Takumasa); this was included in Volume 1, Issue 20 of Quarterly Modern Novels of China (季刊中国現代小説), January 1992, published by Sososha (蒼蒼社). The Russian translation, Жены и наложницы (meaning Wives and Concubines), was done by Natalya Vladimirovna Zakharova (Наталья Владимировна Захарова), published in 2007 by the Russian Academy of Sciences. The Swedish version, titled Den röda lyktan: två berättelser från Kina, was translated by Anna Gustafsson Chen and published in 1993 by Bokförlaget Tranan.

== Plot ==
Lotus is attending university when her father's tea business goes bankrupt. She chooses to become a concubine of Chen Zuoqian in the rich Chen household in order to avoid having to work. From the beginning, she does not fit into the household with its three other wives. Initially, the first mistress Joy ignores her, the second mistress Cloud befriends her, and the third mistress Coral acts with outright hostility. Coral goes so far as to interrupt Lotus's wedding night with the lie that she has taken ill.

Chen's elder son Feipu, who is older than Lotus, comes home. He favors Lotus's company and she begins to fall for him, especially because he plays the flute so well and movingly. Meanwhile, one evening when they are playing mahjong, Lotus notices that Coral is flirting with a doctor.

Swallow, Lotus's personal servant, resents Lotus's status as concubine and neglects her duties whenever possible. One day, Lotus accuses Swallow of stealing her flute (a family heirloom) and searches Swallow's trunk. Instead of finding the flute, she finds a doll with pins stuck in its chest. The doll has "Lotus" written on it, and Lotus demands to know who wrote the word for the illiterate Swallow. It is revealed that Cloud was the one who helped her.

That night, Chen Zuoqian admits that he was the one who stole and burned her flute because he was afraid it was a lover's token. Instead of forgiving him, she bursts into tears and he leaves her. Cloud asks Lotus to cut her hair the next morning, and Lotus cuts her ear. Coral is impressed by Lotus' action and warms further to her. Coral reveals that Cloud attempted to poison her and cause a miscarriage when they were both pregnant. Coral nevertheless gives birth to a son, Feilan.

Feipu arrives with his flute teacher and friend, Young Master Gu, as well as a replacement flute for Lotus. Joy interrupts the flute lesson, however, and Young Master Gu leaves because the mood is destroyed by Feipu's absence. Afterwards, Feipu tells Lotus she is different from other women, who frighten him, and leaves on a business trip.

Chen Zuoqian finally decides to see Lotus. He forgives Lotus for her behavior at his birthday party, but Lotus is unwilling to have sex as she cannot stop thinking about Feipu. Chen eventually leaves her in disgust when she is unable to stop weeping. As a result of Lotus' attitude and the manipulations of Cloud, Lotus loses favor with Chen even more. Later, Cloud claims that Coral hired a boy to beat up her daughter Yirong. Only Lotus and Coral know the truth behind the second mistress' façade, and they slowly become closer friends.

Lotus finds a drawing of her on a piece of soiled toilet paper and confronts Swallow with it. Swallow is afraid at being caught and does not want to be sent away. In a fit of anger, Lotus tells her to eat the toilet paper or be forced out of the Chen household. Swallow catches typhoid and Chen is infuriated with Lotus.

Lotus realizes that her twentieth birthday has gone by and determines to celebrate. When the new servant returns with wine, she announces Swallow has died. Lotus is regretful but says that "dying is better than living". Feipu arrives and a tipsy Lotus reveals how she feels about him. Feipu confesses that he likes her but he is too afraid of women to do anything. After he leaves in shame, Lotus gets very drunk and has a hallucination in which Swallow kills her.

The next morning, Lotus wakes up to see Coral leaving for town. When she comes back, she is escorted by several male servants; Cloud has caught her and the doctor in bed. Coral is locked in her room. That night, Lotus sits up expecting Swallow to return. Instead, she watches the household servants taking Coral from her room and throwing her into the haunted well. Witnessing the murder drives Lotus to insanity.

The novella itself does not have the lanterns nor other visual elements of the film adaptation.

== Characters ==
- Lotus (颂莲; 頌蓮; Sònglián), the fourth mistress
  - Simon Patton of University of Melbourne wrote that Lotus is "a wild, complex woman" and compared her to Antoinette Cosway.
- Coral (梅珊; 楳珊; Méishān), the third mistress
- Cloud (卓云; 卓雲; Zhuóyún), the second mistress
- Swallow (燕儿; 燕兒; Yàn'ér), Lotus's young servant
- Chen Feipu (陈飞浦; 陳飛浦; Chén Fēipǔ), the master's eldest son - Feipu and Lotus fall in love at first sight. Lu Tonglin, author of Misogyny, Cultural Nihilism & Oppositional Politics: Contemporary Chinese Experimental Fiction, stated that this "perhaps" was due to the fact that within the Chen household Songlian and Feipu were the only two educated people.
  - Lotus tries to attract Feipu, but Feipu is afraid of women, so he is uninterested in the affair. He has a homosexual relationship with young Master Gu. Feipu does so not because he prefers men, but out of his fear of women. Lu Tonglin said that in the Su Tong universe, substitutes are not effective replacements for the originals, and so Feipu's homosexual relationship is not an effective replacement for the heterosexuality he is unable to attain. Lu also said "we have to bear in mind that Su Tong was one of the first contemporary writers in mainland China to explore the subject of homosexuality" and because homosexuality was previously a crime in the Mainland, the author's "attempt to explore the topic of homosexuality, however naive and homophobic the experiment may appear (since it is centered on heterosexuality), can be perceived as subversive." Yingjin Zhang of Indiana University stated that Feipu's attitude towards relations with women originated from "abusive sexual behavior" seen in other members of his family.
- Joy (Chinese: 毓如; pinyin: Yùrú), the first wife
- Chen Zuoqian (陈佐千; 陳佐韆; Chén Zuǒqiān), the master of the household
  - Lu says that Chen Zuoqian "is an accomplished womanizer" similar to Liu Laoxia from Opium Family.

== Adaptations ==
- Raise the Red Lantern (大紅燈籠高高掛), a 1991 Chinese film adaptation directed by Zhang Yimou, starring Gong Li as Songlian ("Lotus")
- Raise the Red Lantern (大紅燈籠高高掛), a 1992 Taiwanese TV adaptation directed by Pu Teng-chin, starring Idy Chan as Songlian
- The Lantern Town (花燈滿城), a 2014 Chinese TV adaptation directed by Stanley Tong, starring Tian Hairong as Songlian

The novel was also adapted by the Thai writer Taitao Sucharitkul as "Mong-Kut-Dok-som" (มงกุฎดอกส้ม), which means "the crown with orange flowers".

== Reception ==
Gary Krist of The New York Times wrote that the novel is "a subtle, profoundly feminist tale that nonetheless has all the gamy melodrama of pulp entertainment". According to Patton, the author uses "realism" and "surrealism" in a balanced way.

Krist stated that the novel itself is "remarkable", and that the English translation is "conscientious but often inelegant". Kirkus Reviews wrote that the English translation has "distinctive prose searingly describes men and women brutally shaped by their time and place". Publishers Weekly, which states that the "prose is sometimes dense with long, twisted sentences", concluded that the work "leaves the reader chilled".

Yingjin Zhang overall praised the English translation, arguing it was "generally very readable". The reviewer cited issues which the reviewer characterized as "minor"; the reviewer wished that Duke had more consistency in applying translation to female names to the entire novella collection, citing one character whose name was transliterated instead of translated. Additionally, the reader stated that sometimes the translation did not display "nuances of Su Tong's creative use of Chinese."

Patton wrote that the translator of the English version frequently kept "accuracy" along with "strong literary flavor" along with "flair and sensitivity", and that overall the translation used "impressive skill". Patton argued that at times there was "crassness", and he critiqued some "odd contractions" and what Patton refers to "less assured" dialog that occurs infrequently.

Paul Bady of University of Paris 7 wrote that the French translation had in "touches brèves la force et la simplicité de l'original" ("in brief touches the force and simplicity of the original").

Friederike Freier of Die Tageszeitung criticized the German version for using a title other than that of the Chinese original and for having awkwardness in the translation.
