= Chen Maiping =

Chinese-Swedish writer and poet

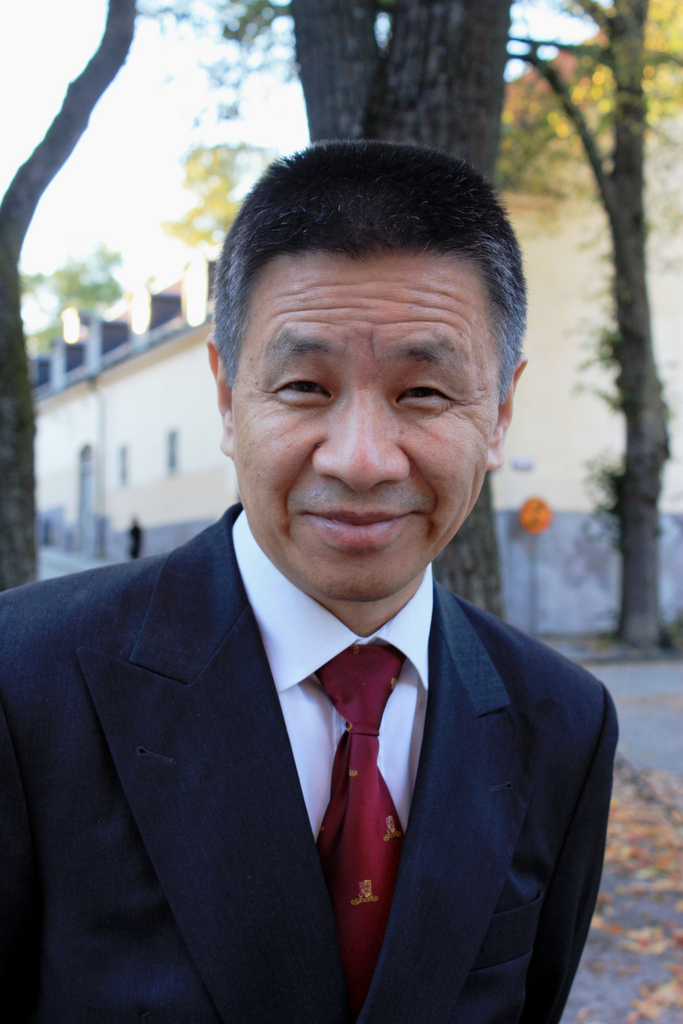
- Chen Maiping in 2011.
- Born: November 4, 1952 (age 73); Changshu, Jiangsu, China
- Education: Capital Normal University; Central Academy of Drama; University of Oslo
- Occupations: Writer, translator, poet
- Spouse: Anna Gustafsson Chen
- Children: A son
- Writing career
- Pen name: Wan Zhi
- Language: Chinese; English; Swedish
- Period: 1985-present

Chen Maiping
- Traditional Chinese: 陳邁平
- Simplified Chinese: 陈迈平
Transcriptions
Standard Mandarin
- Hanyu Pinyin: Chén Màipíng
- Wade–Giles: Ch'en^{2} Mai^{4}-p'ing^{2}

Chen Maiping (born November 4, 1952, in Changshu, Jiangsu) is a Chinese-Swedish writer and poet, known by the pen name Wan Zhi (万之). He has written mostly short stories, and has also translated literature from English and Swedish to Chinese.

During the late 1970s and early 1980s, Chen was an avid contributor to the non-sanctioned, underground literature magazine Jintian (Today). For this, he became watched by the Chinese authorities, and since 1986 he is living in exile. After the Tiananmen Square massacre in 1989, he started Jintian for Chinese in exile and dissentients within China.

Chen moved to Sweden in 1990. He has among other things taught Chinese at Stockholm University, and worked as a translator. He is also the vice president and secretary general of the Independent Chinese PEN Centre. He is married to translator and librarian Anna Gustafsson Chen, who, among other things, has translated Nobel laureate Mo Yan into Swedish.
