= A Case of Two Cities =

2006 novel by Qiu Xiaolong

First edition (publ. Minotaur Books)

A Case of Two Cities is Qiu Xiaolong's fourth Inspector Chen novel (after 2004's When Red Is Black).

== Reception ==
"There's something especially brave and noble about a cop who perseveres under these circumstances. Readers who love China will be heartened, as this gritty, suspenseful tale unfolds, to discover that Inspector Chen is far from alone in his quest to build a humane Chinese society."
