= Nineteen Thirty-four Escapes =

- Chinese: 一九三四年的逃亡
Transcriptions
Standard Mandarin
- Hanyu Pinyin: Yījiǔsānsì Nián de Táowáng
- Wade–Giles: I^{1}-chiu^{3}-san^{1}-ssu^{4} Nien^{2} te T'ao^{2}-wang^{2}

Nineteen Thirty-four Escapes (Chinese: 一九三四年的逃亡; pinyin: Yījiǔsānsì Nián de Táowáng) is a novella by Su Tong, first published in 1987. In 1990 it was published by Yuan-Liou Publishing Co. (遠流出版公司) in a collection with the novella Raise the Red Lantern (which there is titled under its original Chinese title, Wives and Concubines, which is also was the title of the entire volume).

This, told in the first person, is about an impoverished peasant family.

The novella was translated into English by Michael S. Duke, and this translation was published as a collection of stories by Su Tong, named Raise the Red Lantern: Three Novellas, published by William Morrow & Company in 1993. This collection also includes the novellas Raise the Red Lantern and Opium Family.

Nineteen Thirty-four Escapes and Opium Family take place in a fictional location called "Maple Village". Yingjin Zhang of Indiana University compared Maple Village to Yoknapatawpha County. This location is in the south of the country.

== Plot ==
The narration focuses on Grandmother Jiang. (Note: Jiang: simplified Chinese: 蒋; traditional Chinese: 蔣; pinyin: Jiǎng; Wade–Giles: Chiang³) She is married to Chen Baonian, (Note: Chen Baonian: 陈宝年; 陳寶年; Chén Bǎonián; Ch'en² Pao³-nien²) who goes to the city to do business. Jiang finds a woman Chen Baonian is cheating on her with, Huanzi (Note: Huanzi: 环子; 環子; Huánzǐ; Huan²-tzu³). Jiang and Huanzi get engaged in a conflict. Grandmother Jiang has seven children.

The story is set in 1934. The year is used as a dividing line between pre-industrialized and industrialized society in the country, and Liu Zaifu stated that the year was not considered important in Chinese history, but that it is within the work.

There is a narrator who talks about his family. The narrator does not reveal his name, and feels that he does not have a great existence compared to his family.

In the story there is a farmer named Chen Wenzhi (Note: Chen Wenzhi: 陈文治; 陳文治; Chén Wénzhì; Ch'en² Wen²-chih⁴), who engages in voyeurism.

By the end of the novella, six of the children are dead. Sabina Knight (Note: Sabina Knight: She was formerly known as Deirdre Sabina Knight, and her Chinese name is: 桑禀华; 桑稟華; Sāng Bǐnghuá) wrote that "fatalism" is a feature of the work. Xiaobing Tang states that the family experiences "gradual but no less violent disintegration and dispersal".

== Reception ==
Xiaobing Tang, in Chinese Modern: The Heroic and the Quotidian, described the novella's plot as "complex and seminal".

In Nineteen Thirty-four Escapes and Opium Family Duke had stated "that wherever the English seems strange it is because the Chinese was also purposefully so". Gary Krist of The New York Times felt these translations had a "rambling nature" that became "merely awkward, unrevealing and occasionally tedious." Because of Duke's statement, Krist was unsure whether the awkwardness came from Su Tong or from Duke. Publishers Weekly stated that a "hand-me-down quality of oral history" where the reader is unsure of the truth is reflected in Nineteen Thirty-four Escapes.
