= Opium Family =

- Simplified Chinese: 罂粟之家
- Traditional Chinese: 罌粟之家
- Literal meaning: The Family of the Opium Poppy
Transcriptions
Standard Mandarin
- Hanyu Pinyin: Yīngsù zhī Jiā

Opium Family (Chinese: 罂粟之家; pinyin: Yīngsù zhī Jiā) is a novella by Su Tong, first published in 1988.

The novella was translated into English by Michael S. Duke, and this translation was published as a collection of stories by Su Tong, named Raise the Red Lantern: Three Novellas, published by William Morrow & Company in 1993. This collection also includes the novellas Raise the Red Lantern and Nineteen Thirty-four Escapes.

This story is about an opium poppy-growing family that experiences hardship; this work is told in both the first and third person perspectives.

Opium Family and Nineteen Thirty-four Escapes take place in a fictional location called "Maple Village". Yingjin Zhang of Indiana University compared it to Yoknapatawpha County. This location is in the south of the country.

== Story ==
It includes a landlord named Liu Chencao (Note: Liu Chencao: simplified Chinese: 刘沉草; traditional Chinese: 劉沉草; pinyin: Liú Chéncǎo), who was born to a man named Chen Mao (Note: Chen Mao: 陈茂; 陳茂; Chén Mào), but has another landlord, Liu Laoxia (Note: Liu Laoxia: 刘老侠; 劉老俠; Liú Lǎoxiá), as his adopted father.

Chencao is attracted to men, but does not reveal it to others.

Later, a character named Lu Fang (Note: Lu Fang: 卢方; 盧方; Lú Fāng) executes Chencao.

== Reception ==
In regards to Opium Family and Nineteen Thirty-four Escapes, Duke had stated "that wherever the English seems strange it is because the Chinese was also purposefully so". Gary Krist of The New York Times felt the translations had a "rambling nature" that became "merely awkward, unrevealing and occasionally tedious." Because of Duke's statement, Krist was unsure whether the awkwardness came from Su Tong or from Duke. Publishers Weekly praised how Opium Family shifts perspectives and wrote that Opium Family is "the most structurally and thematically complex of the novellas."
