= Red Scarf (company) =

Online media and digital marketing company

- Company type: Limited company
- Industry: Online media and marketing communications
- Founded: 2012; 13 years ago
- Founder: Pauline Guo
- Products: British lifestyle site for Chinese audience
- Website: www.honglingjin.co.uk

Red Scarf (Chinese: 红领巾; pinyin: hónglǐngjīn) is a London-based online media and digital marketing communications company. The company provides a British lifestyle website produced in Chinese for a Chinese speaking audience. The stated aim of company is to help British companies plan and execute online marketing activities, which include offline stores for the Chinese speaking community.

== History ==
Pauline Guo, a MA Marketing Communications graduate from London College of Communication, University of the Arts, founded the company in 2012. After graduating, she started Red Scarf as a blog on Sina Weibo, with Pauline posting about United Kingdom life, news and advice. She has been described as "the most useful account for Chinese students in the UK".

Red Scarf surpassed 6.7 million online users in 2019.

As of January 2024, Red Scarf has merged with the French-based company ECENTIME. Together, they aim to be the first and only platform of their kind. As part of the family, Red Scarf maintains its unique brand identity while utilizing ECENTIME's vast network and cutting-edge technology. Under the leadership of the newly appointed Group CEO Yangke SUN, a renowned expert in recommendation systems, they are focused on helping UK brands expand into the Chinese market.

== About ==
The company owns and manages a United Kingdom lifestyle website, written in the Chinese language, under the Red Scarf name. The stated aim of the site is to help people from Mainland China who are currently living in or visiting the United Kingdom. Red Scarf is also on two Chinese social media platforms, Sina Weibo and WeChat.

=== Name ===
Its readers commonly know Red Scarf as "honglingjin", which is a direct translation of red scarf in Chinese. It is a symbol of the international communist pioneer movement and a part of the school uniform worn by primary school students in mainland China.

=== Website ===
The website covers seven different categories: shopping, deals, restaurants, life, holiday, visas and events. It received over 6.5 million unique visitors in 2017 and, on average, 540,000 unique visitors per month, with 65% of traffic generated from the United Kingdom and 24% from China. The reader demographic from the latest 2017 Red Scarf Readers Survey shows that they are mostly females, aged 18 to 25, study undergraduate and postgraduate degrees in the United Kingdom, and mostly reside in England.

In 2017, the Red Scarf official website launched a preparation guide named the '2017 British Red Scarf life guide report'.

== See also ==
Red Scarf British life handbook
