= Red Kite, Blue Kite =

2013 children's book written by Ji-li Jiang

Red Kite, Blue Kite is a 2013 children's book written by Ji-li Jiang and illustrated by Greg Ruth.

Set in China, it follows the story of Tai Shan, a boy who enjoys flying kites. He readjusts with his situation when his father, referred to in the book as the Chinese word for father, "Ba Ba" (爸爸), is detained as part of the Cultural Revolution. He stays with an unrelated old woman, named Granny Wang, until he is reunited with his father.

Publishers Weekly stated that the conflict was handled with "scrupulous honesty".

Publishers Weekly recommended the book for older children due to the content of the plot. Kirkus Reviews stated "any child coping with separation from a loved one may find comfort in this story."
