= Red Scarf British Life Handbook =

Red Scarf British Life Handbook (Chinese: 红领巾英国生活指南; pinyin: Hónglǐngjīn yīngguó shēnghuó zhǐnán) is a platform launched by Red Scarf Limited in 2012. The Red Scarf British Life Handbook is a website about how Chinese people live in the United Kingdom.

The company 'red scarf' supposedly represents the red scarf given to The Young Pioneers’ group as honour. The Red Scarf provides information on shopping, travel, and lifestyle.

== Website ==
The website is a guide for British supermarkets such as Sainsbury, Tesco, M&S, and Asda. The travel topic includes travel destination suggestions, visa applications, hotels, and a local cultural introduction. On the Red Scarf official Weibo, there are around 20 thousand articles about travelling.

In 2017, the Red Scarf official website launched a preparation guide named the ‘2017 British Red Scarf life guide report’.

The categories of the food handbook on the platform can be divided into breakfast, lunch, dinner recommendations, frozen food, fruits & vegetables, condiments, and snack suggestions. The seasonal food map is another field on the main website. The Life Handbook is composed of 7 chapters, which are preparation, residential, section, life, financial, journal, and safety chapter.
