= Misogyny, Cultural Nihilism & Oppositional Politics =

Misogyny, Cultural Nihilism & Oppositional Politics: Contemporary Chinese Experimental Fiction is a non-fiction book by Lu Tonglin, published in 1995 by Stanford University Press.

Its emphasis is 1980s-1995 experimental fiction from China, and Misogyny, Cultural Nihilism & Oppositional Politics has discussions about the following authors: Can Xue, Lu Xun, Mo Yan, Su Tong, Yu Hua, and Zhaxi Dawa. Five are/were male, with four of them being from the then-modern time. Can Xue is the sole female author discussed. Five authors total were current authors in the time the book was published. According to Fatima Wu of Loyola Marymount University, Lu Xun's "influence on later writers" made his inclusion critical in the work otherwise about then-modern writers.

Lu Tonglin argued that many of the modern writers, in turning away from Communist and May 4th movement ideology, which promoted women's rights, were introducing misogyny. The idea is that it resulted from the loss of belief in ideology that was previously present in China, and with that loss was the loss of opposition to a previous entity, being the exercise of power from the Chinese Communist Party in the era of Mao Zedong.

== Background ==
Lu Tonglin had influences from the works of Luce Irigaray.

== Contents ==
The author's section on Mo Yan discusses the origins of the author's sexualization of the "grandmother" character.

Chapter 4 includes a discussion about Zhaxi Dawa. Yu Hua is discussed in Chapter 6.

Lu Tonglin argues that the violence against and degradation of women in the works of Su Tong and Yu Hua enforce the inferior status of women. The author also argues that Can Xue opposes both misogyny and the primary ideology in China, and Rosemary Haddon of Massey University argued that this made Can Xue "the only subversive" "voice" of the authors chronicled in the book.

== Reception ==
Haddon praised the "insightful, original analysis".

Ursula K. Heise of Columbia University praised the content about the analysis of the roles of female characters in the works but argued the "theoretical assumptions" in the text were "less persuasive".

Gregory B. Lee of the University of Hong Kong argued that the book had "impressive and well-argued, passionate readings" of the works of literature. He praised the "passionate commitment to illuminate" these issues in the culture of China and the "breadth of the author's knowledge and the clarity of her historical purview".

Wu stated she was interested in the work due to its focus on gender relations and issues on Chinese politics and culture as expressed in the works written by these authors. According to Wu, the "images of women" present in the authors' works was the aspect that most interested her.

Wendy Larson of the University of Oregon wrote that Misogyny, Cultural Nihilism & Oppositional Politics is "especially valuable when it is paired with historical studies of women's position in premodern and modern China."
