= Years of Red Dust =

2008 book by Qiu Xiaolong

- First edition (French)
- Author: Qiu Xiaolong
- Original title: Cité de la Poussière rouge
- Language: English
- Genre: Short stories
- Published: French translation in 2008; English book in 2010
- Pages: 240
- ISBN: 9781429942614

Years of Red Dust is a collection of short stories by Qiu Xiaolong. The book in English was published in 2010; but the stories were originally published in Le Monde and a book in French was published in 2008.

It is a story about China between 1949 and 2005, told through changes experienced by people living in the Red Dust neighbourhood in Shanghai.

== Plot ==
Each chapter tells a story from a different year, consisting of two strands, slice-of-life personal histories of ordinary people living in Red Dust Lane, mixed with the ever-changing narrative of China's socialist history. Most of the stories begin with non-fiction excerpts from wall newspapers of China's past. Incidents involve neighbors who are academics, those who own businesses, those who join the military, as well as manual laborers. One chapter includes a fictionalized account, based on a real life event, of preparations for the day U.S. President Richard Nixon visited Shanghai.

The setting is in Shanghai where "the flow of the green slime of corruption, pollution and greed (for money), races with the flow of blood and champagne", according to Aftenposten.

== Sales ==
The book has been on best-seller lists in France and Germany.

== Translations ==
The book has been translated to other languages, including:

- French: Cité de la poussière rouge, translated from English by Fanchita Gonzalez Batlle, éditions Liana Levi, 2008 (ISBN 978-2-86746-665-6).
- German: Das Tor zur Roten Gasse.
- Norwegian: År i rødt støv (2011).
