= He Zhihong =

Chinese-French children's book illustrator

- 何炙鴻
- Born: March 20, 1970 (age 56); China
- Spouse: Guillaume Olive
- Website: www.hezhihong.com

He Zhihong 何炙鴻 (born March 20, 1970) is a Chinese-French illustrator of children's books.

She was born in China and started to paint as a child with her father, who was a painter. She graduated from Beijing Academy of Fine Arts, where she studied traditional Chinese painting. She paints on both silk and rice paper. He Zhihong now lives in Paris and has several books published in France. Contes des peuples de Chine received the Nuit du Livre award for the best children’s book.

== List of works ==
- Contes de Chine : L'origine des grandes fêtes, Seuil Jeunesse, 2014
- Que fais-tu bébé ?, Seuil Jeunesse, 2014
- Voilà le loup, Chan Ok, 2013
- Nian le terrible, Seuil Jeunesse, 2012
- Mes images de Chine, Seuil Jeunesse, 2011
- (with Guillaume Olive) My First Book of Chinese Calligraphy, Tuttle Publishing, 2010
- La Grande Muraille de Chine, Casterman, 2009
- Poèmes de Chine, Seuil, 2009
- La fille du pays des neiges, Sorbier, 2007
- Pourquoi le tigre ne grimpe pas aux arbres, Seuil Jeunesse, 2007
- J’apprends la calligraphie chinoise, Picquier Jeunesse, 2006
- Le cerf-volant dans l’arbre, Picquier Jeunesse, 2006
- La forêt des pandas, Seuil Jeunesse, 2006 (Prix Saint-Exupéry)
- Long-long’s New Year, Frances Lincoln, 2005 (Peter Pan Prize)
- Lili et le rêve du papillon, Bleu de Chine, 2005
- Lili et le goût de la Chine, Bleu de Chine, 2004
- Le mariage de Souricette, Syros Jeunesse, 2004
- Ma vie à Pékin au fil des mois, Syros Jeunesse, 2003
- Contes des peuples de Chine, Syros Jeunesse, 2003 (Prix de la Nuit du Livre)
- Contes de Mandchourie : Le fleuve du dragon noir, L’école des loisirs, 2003
- Le daim mangeur de tigre, L’école des loisirs, 2002
