= Petulia's Rouge Tin =

1991 novella by Chinese author Su Tong

- 2018 English edition
- Author: Su Tong
- Original title: 紅粉 "Blush" or "Rouge"
- Translator: Jane Weizhen Pan and Martin Merz
- Language: Mandarin Chinese
- Publication date: 1991
- Publication place: China
- English publication date: 2018
- Media type: Print

Petulia's Rouge Tin
- Simplified Chinese: 红粉
- Traditional Chinese: 紅粉
- Literal meaning: "Blush" or "Rouge"
Transcriptions
Standard Mandarin
- Hanyu Pinyin: Hóngfěn

Petulia's Rouge Tin (Chinese: 红粉) is a 1991 novella by Chinese author Su Tong. Its official English translation, done by Jane Weizhen Pan (traditional Chinese: 潘維真; simplified Chinese: 潘维真; pinyin: Pān Wéizhēn) and Martin Merz, was published by Penguin Specials in 2018. Peter Gordon of the Asian Review of Books stated that the work's focus on the characters and their situations was an influence from Russian literature.

It is set in the 1950s, in Shanghai, when the new government began requiring former prostitutes to be re-educated. Two former prostitutes, Petulia and Autumn Grace, are among those taken away to the Women's Labour Training Camp, even though their previous place of employment, Red Delight Pavilion, is still operating. Petulia spends three years, there and develops her relationship with her longtime customer, and husband, Mr. P'u, who tries to maintain his former quality of life after having assets seized by the new government. Autumn Grace escapes from the truck taking her to the camp and stays in a compound for Buddhist nuns. Gordon stated that a "clear denouement or resolution" was not present in the book, and that this was also a Russian influence.

The title of the English translation is a reference to a piece of tin that is the only aspect remaining from the characters' pre-1949 lives.

== Writing style ==
An essay in Modern Chinese Literature, Volume 10 stated that it was an example of a work that had a "more straightforward, realistic description and greater thematic openness." According to Gordon, the author "has great economy of language, saying a great deal in few words." He characterised the reading pace as "brisk".

The translators stated that the original Chinese version of the work used aspects of the grammar of "traditional vernacular literary Chinese", which the author used to "inject a nostalgic mood". These features included referring to characters by names in place of using pronouns and not using quotation marks; the usage of pronouns and quotation marks in literary Chinese dated from the 1920s.

Since Hanyu Pinyin had not yet been introduced to China in the time period of the setting, the translators chose to use Wade-Giles romanization. The translators chose not to emulate the lack of pronouns nor the lack of quotation marks in the English version due to readability concerns.

== Characters ==
The translators rendered the names of the women characters into their literal meanings to highlight their roles in the stories, instead of keeping the names in a romanized form.

- Petulia (小萼; Xiǎo È; Hsiao³ E/O⁴; 'Little Calyx') - Catherine Shipley of the Reading Chinese Network described her as "needy". Her original Chinese name means the calyx of a flower; the translators decided that using "Petulia" has the "feel" of the Chinese name and has a "suggestive nature".
- Autumn Grace (秋仪; 秋儀; Qiū Yí; Chiu¹ I²) - Shipley described her as "Strong-Headed".
- Mr. P'u (老浦; Lǎo Pǔ; Lao³ P'u³; 'Old Pu') - He is described by Shipley as "kind", and by Gordon as "feckless" and unfortunate. According to Gordon, he has more trouble adjusting to his new life than the two women do, and that P'u is "courageous when pushed, yet completely out of his depth when it comes to dealing with women."
- Lucky Phoenix (瑞凤; 瑞鳳; Ruìfèng; Jui⁴-feng⁴; 'Lucky Phoenix')

== Reception ==
Gordon ranked the book four of five stars and called it "another winner".

Shipley stated that the author "intelligently and creatively produced a story that allows the reader to gain an insight into a politically turbulent time, and has used a unique approach to do so."

Henry Yunwei Wang, also of the Reading Chinese Network, stated that the original book had "brisk style of writing and exquisite command of language", and that the translation was a "brilliant English equivalent" in which the features of the original "are well reflected" and "shine through well".

== Adaptations ==
A film version, titled Blush, was made in 1994, and directed by Li Shaohong. Another film version, 1995's Rouged Beauties (hongfen jiaren), was directed by Huang Shuqin.
