= Rice (novel) =

Novel by Su Tong

Rice (Chinese: 米; pinyin: Mǐ) is a novel by Chinese author Su Tong. It was published in Chinese by Yuan-Liou Publishing Co. (遠流出版公司).

It was the first full length novel by Su Tong published in English. Sabina Knight (Chinese name: Chinese: 桑稟華; pinyin: Sāng Bǐnghuá), formerly known as Deirdre Sabina Knight, described Rice as Su Tong's first full length novel.

Morrow/HarperCollins published the English version.

== Plot ==
The story is based during the flood days in 1930s in China, when people immigrated from the countryside to the urban areas in search of work. This is also a story about Five Dragons, a poor but haughty country boy, chancing his fortune in the city and the humiliation he faces as soon as he reaches the city.

He is a typical man hungry for wealth but with an insatiable thirst for pleasure, especially sex. His master has two daughters, "Cloud Weave" and "Cloud Silk". Cloud Weave is very much like Five Dragons, and shares his sexual appetite. She is a mistress to a local mafia.

Five Dragons marries her and inherits the property of his master: his rice emporium and his whole business. But men tire easily of their playthings, particularly in this wayward family. Fidelity is an unrecognised term for them.

This story also shows how infidelity passes from one generation to another in this family.

== Reception ==
In regards to the English translation, Kirkus Reviews described it as a "riveting melodrama". Publishers Weekly noted the translated version with a star and stated "there's much that's beautiful in the way he portrays it-with seething energy and anger."
