= Li Shaohong =

Chinese film and television director

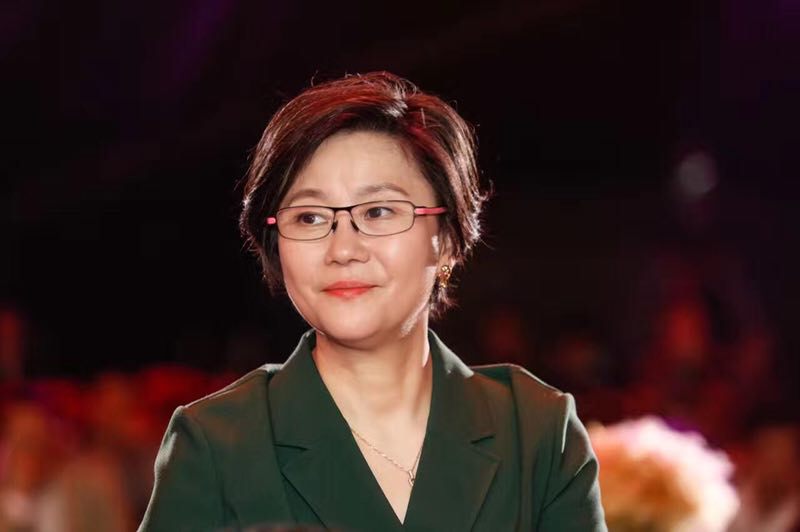
- Li Shaohong in the 2000s
- Born: 7 July 1955 (age 71); Suzhou, Jiangsu, China
- Occupations: film and television director and producer
- Years active: 1982–present
- Spouse: Zeng Nianping

Chinese name
- Simplified Chinese: 李少红
- Traditional Chinese: 李少紅
Transcriptions
Standard Mandarin
- Hanyu Pinyin: Lǐ Shàohóng

Li Shaohong (born 7 July 1955) is a Chinese film and television director and producer. She is considered a member of the Fifth Generation movement, and China's top woman director. Her films have won multiple awards in China and abroad, including the Golden Montgolfiere at the 1992 Three Continents Festival (for Bloody Morning), and the Silver Bear at the 1995 Berlin International Film Festival (for Blush).

== Early life ==
Li was born on 7 July 1955 in Suzhou, Jiangsu, but is considered a native of her ancestral hometown, Wendeng, Shandong, by Chinese convention. In 1969, when she was only 14, Li joined the army in the Sichuan military region, working in a military hospital. Reflecting on her military life, she said the army had too many rules and did not suit her personality, and she decided to pursue a film career. After the end of the Cultural Revolution, she was admitted to Beijing Film Academy in 1978, graduating from its film directing department in 1982.

== Career ==
In 1982, Li joined the Beijing Film Studio, where she worked as the assistant director for several films. In 1988, she directed her first film The Case of the Silver Snake.

Li's 1990 film Bloody Morning was a great success, winning multiple awards in China, Taiwan, France, and Germany, including the Golden Montgolfiere at the 1992 Three Continents Festival in Nantes. She became recognized as a member of the Fifth Generation movement of Chinese cinema, a loose collection of mainland Chinese filmmakers that first emerged in the early to mid-1980s, along with other directors like Zhang Yimou and Chen Kaige. Like other Fifth Generation films, Li Shaohong's works often focus on the rural side of Chinese society.

In 1994, she directed the film Blush (Hongfen), adapted from Su Tong's eponymous novel about two Shanghai prostitutes at the time of Liberation in 1949. The film won the Silver Bear for Outstanding Single Achievement at the 45th Berlin International Film Festival in 1995.

With the 2004 film Baober in Love, Li broke the mode of her previous works and ventured into the realm of magical realism.

Li is also a producer and has her own film production company. She has become a household name in China and is considered China's top woman director. She has also directed several TV dramas, including Palace of Desire (2000), which won the 18th Golden Eagle award for best TV drama, and The Dream of Red Mansions (2010).

== Personal life ==
Li Shaohong is married to Zeng Nianping (曾念平), a cameraman. They met at the Beijing Film Academy, where she was a student and he was an assistant professor. They have a daughter.

== Filmography ==
Year	English title	Chinese title	Notes
1988	The Case of the Silver Snake	银蛇谋杀案	
1990	Bloody Morning	血色清晨	Winner of the Golden Montgolfiere at the 1992 Three Continents Festival
1992	Family Portrait	四十不惑	
1995	Blush	红粉	Winner of the Silver Bear at the 1995 Berlin International Film Festival
1997	The Red Suit	红西服	
1997	Thunderstorm	雷雨	TV series; 20 episodes
2000	Palace of Desire	大明宫词	TV series
2001	Ju Zi Hong Le	橘子红了	TV series
2004	Baober in Love	恋爱中的宝贝	
2005	Stolen Life	生死劫	Golden Crow Pheasant at the 2005 International Film Festival of Kerala; Best Narrative Feature at the 2005 Tribeca Film Festival
2007	The Door	门	
2010	The Dream of Red Mansions	红楼梦	TV series
2013	Flowers of Pinellia Ternata	花开半夏	TV series
2018	The Chronicles of Town Called Jian	茧镇奇缘	TV series; producer
2019	Poetry of the Song Dynasty	大宋宫词	
2019	A City Called Macau	妈阁是座城	
2019	Liberation	解放·终局营救	Co-directed with Chang Xiaoyang
2020	Unbending Will	石头开花	TV series; 20 episodes
2020	Hear Her	听见她说	TV series; 1 episode
2021	Palace of Devotion	大宋宫词	TV series
2022	Hero	世间有她	Segment: "China – Wuhan Story"
2025	Wei Lie	围猎	TV series
