= Wuxi fried spare ribs =

Chinese pork rib dish

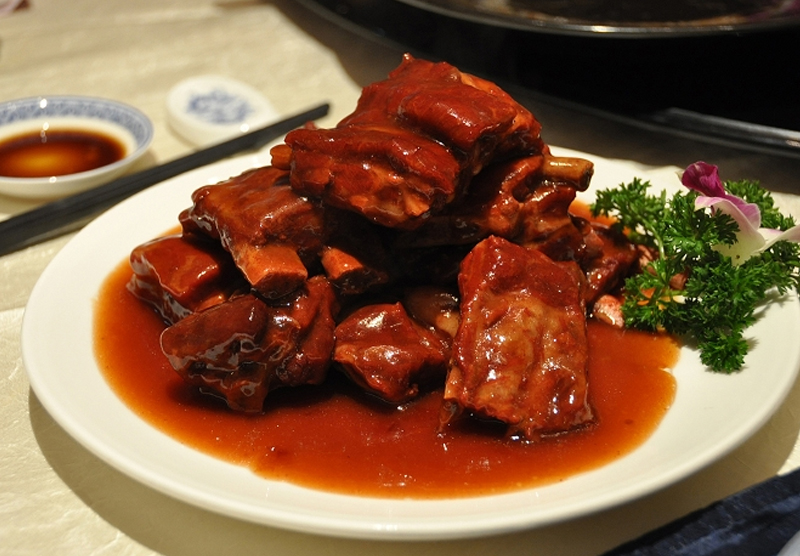
Wuxi fried spare ribs

Wuxi fried spare ribs (Chinese: 无锡糖醋排骨; pinyin: Wúxītangcu páigǔ) is a kind of Chinese traditional food from Wuxi City, Jiangsu Province, China. They are made from high-quality pork ribs and a number of seasonings, like soy sauce, sugar and ginger.
