= Honglingjin Park =

Public park in Beijing, China

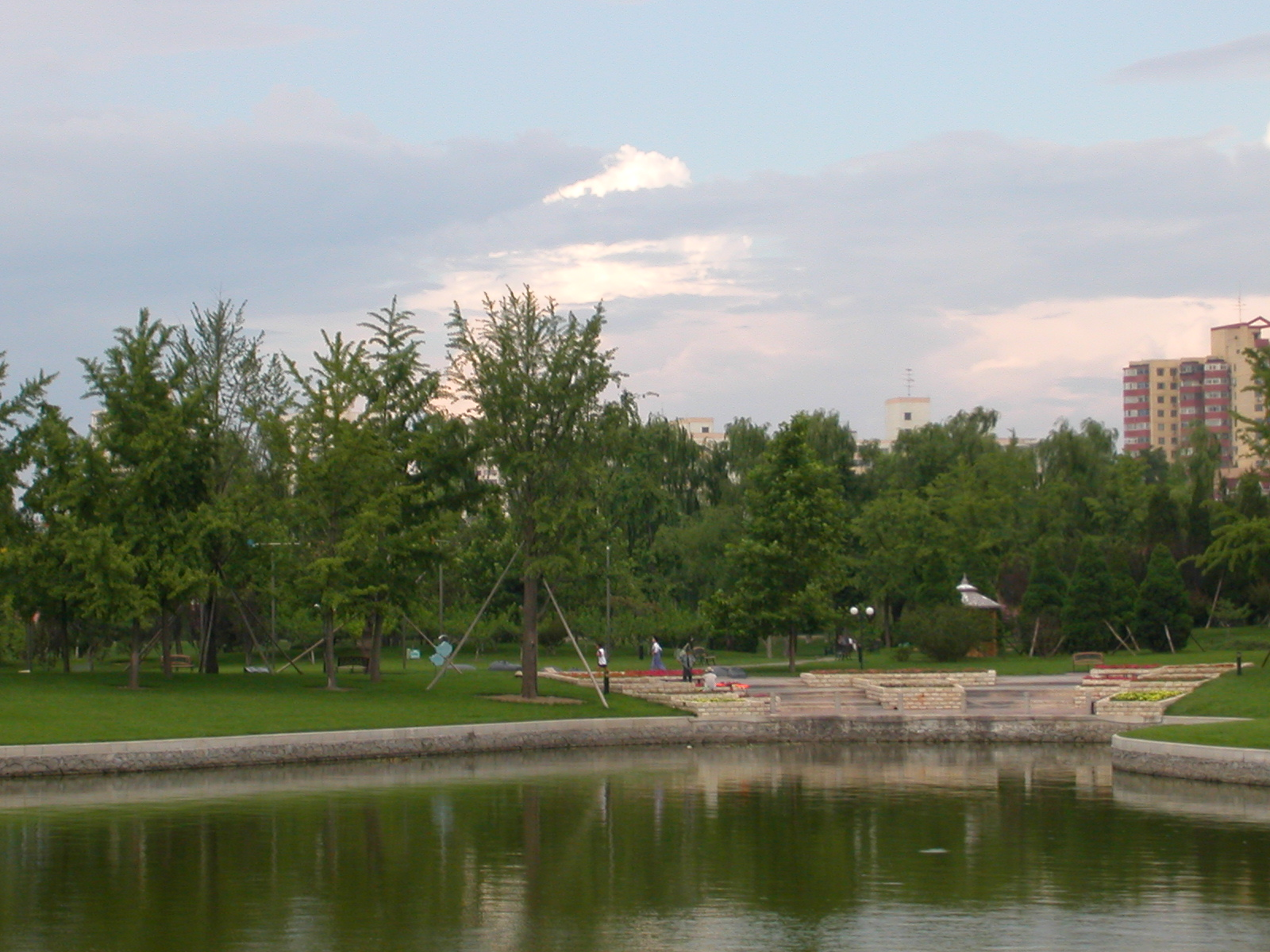

- Location within Beijing Location within China
- Interactive map of Honglingjin Park
- Location: No. 5 Houbalizhuang, Chaoyang District, Beijing
- Coordinates: 39°55′34″N 116°29′09″E
- Area: 389,000 square metres (96 acres)
- Created: 1958; 68 years ago
- Status: Open year round

Honglingjin Park (simplified Chinese: 红领巾公园; traditional Chinese: 紅領巾公園; pinyin: Hónglǐngjīn Gōngyuán) is a public park in Beijing.

The park, designated a national AAA scenic spot, lies at the junction of East 4th Ring Road and Chaoyang North Road, to the northeast of Honglingjin Bridge, about 10 kilometers from the center of the city. It is the only theme park for children named "Red scarf" in the country. It is a place for patriotic and popular science education for teenagers. Built in 1958, now it covers an area of .389 square kilometres (96 acres), of which .160 square kilometres (40 acres) are covered by water, and has a 96% greenery coverage rate. The lawn surrounding the lake is dotted with trees and flowers. Major attractions are a theme square named "Song of the Red Scarf", Ginkgo Square, a children's playground, the Practical Road Safety Education Base, and several groups of artistic sculptures. Every year the park holds a scientific garden party on June 1 and a cultural festival for twins in Beijing on October 1.

== Attractions ==
- "Song of the Red Scarf" theme square: This 3,000-square-metre (32,000 sq ft) square lies in the west of the squares zone near the south gate of the park. At its north end stands a theme sculpture named "Song of the Red Scarf", which consists of five radial steel columns topped by a golden torch with a semicircle relief sculpture as the backdrop. On both sides of the square stand the sculptures of young revolutionary martyrs such as Lei Feng, Liu Hulan, Liu Wenxue, and 'Little Carrot', which are surrounded with flowers and green lawns.
- Ginkgo Square: This 5,000-square-metre (54,000 sq ft) square, which lies behind the south gate, has 27 large ginkgo trees. The square is paved with terrazzo. On its east side is a 1,920-square-metre (20,700 sq ft) tiered flower bed that runs to 240 metres (790 ft) along the eastern bank of the lake.
- Practical Road Safety Education Base for minor citizens: The base mainly consists of a central square, a car ground, an inner ring road and an outer one. Here learning and playing are blended. Children learn about traffic laws and regulations by driving electric cars on a simulated highway.
- Children's playground: This is divided into two sections, one in the north and the other in the south, which cover a total area of 6,300 square metres (68,000 sq ft). In the north playground there are fruit-worm gliding cars, wave cars, battery cars, a carousel, and bumper cars. In the south park there are an artificial sandlot, inflated toys, and indoor entertainment facilities. The amusement facilities are available all year round.
- Steps in the Sun: These are 18 groups of artistic and educational sculptures scattered in the park.
