= Death of a Red Heroine =

2000 mystery novel by Qiu Xiaolon

- First edition
- Author: Qiu Xiaolong
- Language: English
- Series: Inspector Chen Cao
- Genre: Mystery
- Publisher: Soho Press
- Publication date: 2000
- Pages: 408
- ISBN: 978-1569471937

Death of a Red Heroine is a mystery novel written by Qiu Xiaolong and was published in English in 2000. It won the 2001 Anthony Award for best first novel. It is the first instalment in Qiu's Inspector Chen Cao series.

== Plot summary ==
This story is set in Shanghai in the early 1990s. One day, Guan Hongying is found dead. Chief inspector Chen Cao, along with his subordinate, Yu, start to investigate this murder case and find that this young woman lived a double life. On one side, Guan Hongying was a member of Communist Party and a popular public figure. On the other, she lived a “degenerate” lifestyle, away from the eyes of the public. This secret lifestyle brings the case into the public's attention, once this young woman dies. During the investigation, Chen and Yu discover that the number one suspect, Wu Xiaoming, is the son of Wu Bing, a high-ranking Party cadre. Wu and his father put the detectives under a huge pressure to avoid investigating, but with the help of Ling's father, Chen succeeds to save himself from the pressure and sends Wu to the court. Chen and Yu struggle to discover his motive to kill Guan. Eventually, Chen discovers his motive: Guan had been blackmailing Wu to make him leave his wife. Wu did not want Guan to jeopardize his political career. As a result, he murdered her. Chen brings these facts to the attention of his superiors.

== Characters ==
- Chief Inspector Chen Cao
  - The lead investigator of the murder case. Although Chen was originally on a career track to be a diplomat, his uncle is discovered to be a counter-revolutionary, which leads to him being assigned to the Shanghai Police Bureau.
- Guan Hongying
  - The victim of the homicide. Hongying, literally meaning red heroine, is the inspiration for the book's title. Since her death is introduced in the beginning of the story, Guan can only be observed through the accounts of others.
- Wu Xiaoming
  - Wu Xiaoming is the murderer of Guan Hongying. He seduces women and takes obscene photos to be used as blackmail. A son of a powerful Communist Party official, Wu consistently attempts to derail the investigation with his influence.
- Detective Yu Guangming
  - A career police officer who partners with Chen in the investigation. Yu initially believes that Chief Inspector Chen Cao is unworthy of his high position. Despite this view, his relationship with Chen strengthens as the case progresses.
- Ling
  - Chen's former girlfriend in university. A daughter of an even higher Communist Party official. Her influences save Chen and send Wu to trial.

== Theme ==
=== Politics ===
In the novel, Qiu portrays the complex politics and economy of the People's Republic of China. The political tension during the early 1990s is represented through the novel's principle characters. Chen, a rising young cadre, symbolizes the new-capitalist force of Deng Xiaoping. Guan Hongying represents the old-socialist force. Wu Xiaoming, the murderer and son of a high cadre, represents the powerful old-guard cadres. Detective Yu, Chen's assistant, represents the ordinary citizens who welcome reform, yet have doubts.

== Style ==
Qiu adapts the Classical Chinese storytelling style. In Classical Chinese novels, the insertion of poetry serves as a brief introduction and conclusion to a chapter. In addition to poetry, Qiu inserts popular Chinese idioms, historical allusions, philosophical aphorism and Maoist speeches. It has been criticized that these inclusions slow down the pace and intrude the suspense that is crucial for a detective story.

== Background ==
In an interview, Qiu explains that he had not intended to write Death of a Red Heroine as a “detective story”. However, the genre provides him with a structure that meets his intention. His intention is to examine the old-socialist and new-capitalist tensions that occur during the early 1990s.

== Reception ==
In 2001, Death of a Red Heroine received the Anthony Award for "Best First Novel" and has been nominated for the Edgar Awards for "Best First Novel."

The differences of Qiu's style from traditional Western detective story is stated to be “[a]n impressive and welcome respite from the typical crime novel.”

=== Reviews ===
Scholar Liu Bai reviews the book from the perspective of trauma theory, which puts individuals' trauma on a social level to reveal the structure of power in society. In his opinion, there is a close relationship between the psychological trauma of main characters and their social power. This also reflects Qiu Xiaolong's expectation towards the society he lives in.

For example, Chen Cao is suffering from his breakup with Ling due to their differing social status. Guan Hongying's death, a form of physical trauma, is a representation of her political failure. This is an example of the many implicit power relationships found in this book.

Liu also found that the book reveals Qiu Xiaolong's awareness of fighting for his own freedom of speech. In the book, Liu found the characters face a lot of anxiety in regards to their self-identification. He argues that those anxieties reflect Qiu Xiaolong's expectation to obtain acknowledgment of his own social identity as a member of ethnic minority in America.

== Chinese translation ==
The book was translated into Chinese by Yu Lei (俞雷) under the title Hóng yīng zhī sǐ (红英之死). While sections of the text critical of the Cultural Revolution, the high cadre's children (高干子弟), and the Party were faithfully translated, some sexual scenes and descriptions were removed.
