= Red scarf =

Primary symbol of youth communist organisations

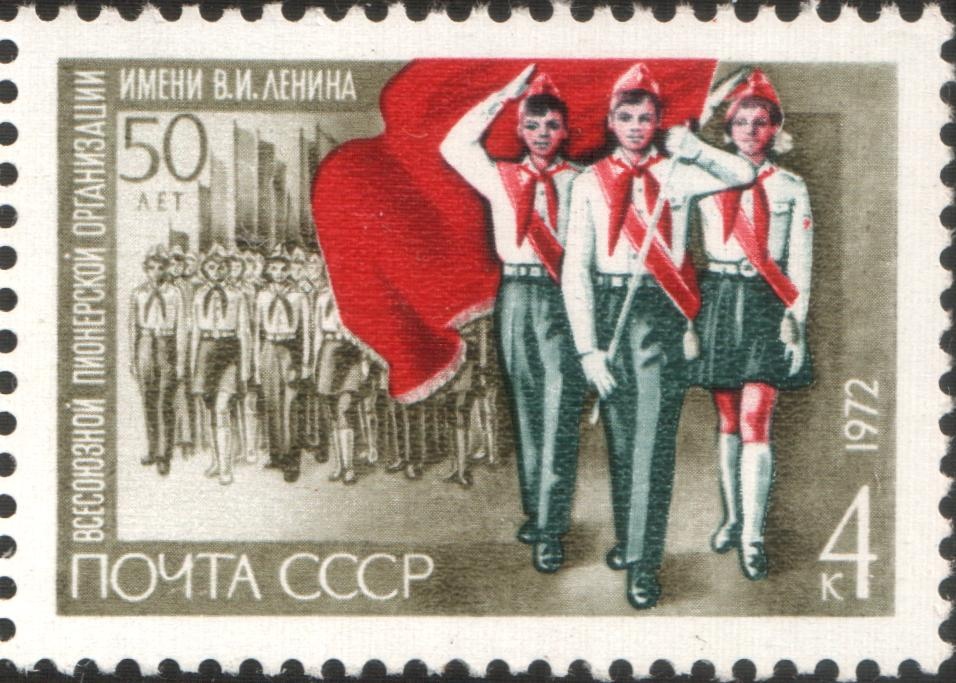
USSR postage stamp, 1972

The red scarf is a neckerchief worn by young pioneers of several communist and socialist countries. In the Soviet Union, it was known as pionerskiy galstuk (пионерский галстук, 'pioneer's tie'), in Vietnam as khăn quàng đỏ, in China as hóng lǐngjīn (simplified Chinese: 红领巾; traditional Chinese: 紅領巾), in Cuba as pañoleta roja, and in Hungary as úttörőnyakkendő (lit. 'pioneer's neckerchief').

== Background ==
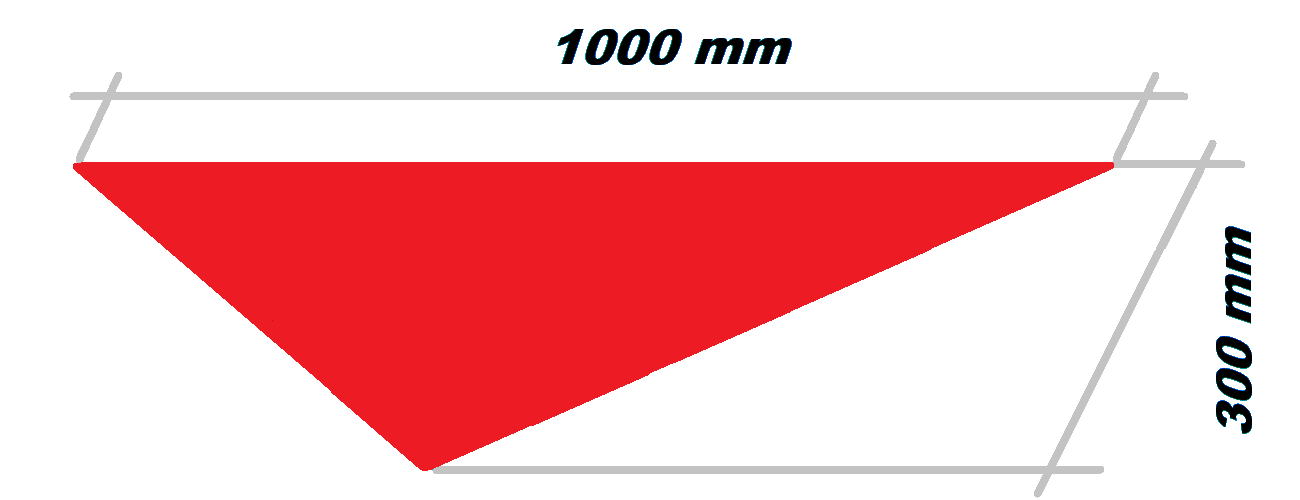
Soviet red scarf

It remains in use by the young pioneer organizations of China, Vietnam, North Korea, and Cuba, and – unofficially, on occasions – in many other countries, such as Russia, Venezuela, Zimbabwe, Belarus, Ukraine, Finland, etc. In China, the scarf is emblematic of the blood of the revolutionary Red Guards, as recalled in Red Scarf Park and the title of Red Scarf Girl by Ji-li Jiang about her experiences during the Cultural Revolution. In Cuba, the scarf is worn by schoolchildren from first to sixth grade.

== Other users ==
A red scarf was introduced into the Republic of Korea Air Force as a device to aid visual location of downed South Korean airmen, it became and remains an iconic item of uniform in the Republic of Korea Air Force.

=== Foulards Rouges ===
A red scarf ('foulard rouge') was adopted as the symbol of those counter-protesting the excesses and violence of the yellow vests movement ('gilets jaunes').

== Gallery ==
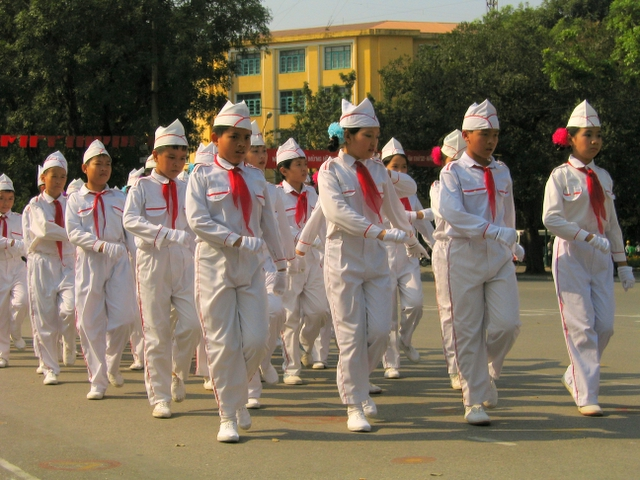
Pioneers in Vietnam, 2003

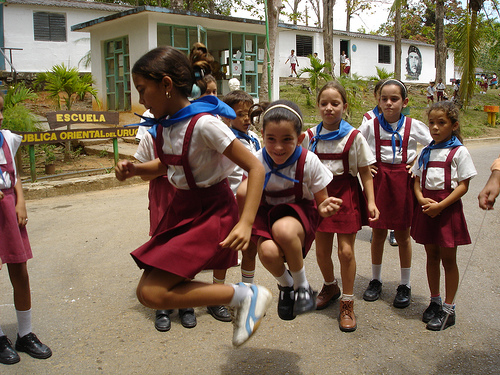
Cuban schoolchildren wearing blue scarves, 2006
