= Blush (1995 film) =

1995 film by Li Shaohong

- Film poster
- Simplified Chinese: 红粉
- Traditional Chinese: 紅粉
- Literal meaning: "Blush" or "Rouge"
- Hanyu Pinyin: Hóngfěn
- Directed by: Li Shaohong
- Screenplay by: Ni Zhen; Li Shaohong
- Based on: Petulia's Rouge Tin by Su Tong
- Produced by: Chen Kunming; Yi Liu; Jimmy Tan
- Starring: Wang Ji; He Saifei; Wang Zhiwen
- Cinematography: Zeng Nianping
- Edited by: Zhou Xinxia
- Music by: Guo Wenjing
- Production companies: Beijing Film Studio; Ocean Film
- Distributed by: First Run Features (US)
- Release date: 8 September 1995 (Toronto)
- Running time: 115 minutes
- Countries: China; British Hong Kong
- Language: Mandarin

Blush (Chinese: 红粉) is a 1995 Chinese film about the experience of two women during China's campaign to re-educate prostitutes. Blush was directed by Li Shaohong and stars He Saifei, Wang Ji, and Wang Zhiwen. The film was a co-production between Hong Kong's Ocean Film and Beijing Film Studio. The film is based on the novel Petulia's Rouge Tin (in Chinese, named Hóngfěn) by the writer Su Tong. Blush won the Silver Bear for Outstanding Single Achievement at the 45th Berlin International Film Festival, and Golden Peacock (Best Film) at the 27th International Film Festival of India.

== Plot ==
Blush takes place in the 1950s during a campaign by the new Communist government in China designed to "re-educate" prostitutes to become contributing members of society. Two such prostitutes, Xiao'e (Note: Chinese: 小萼; pinyin: Xiǎo È; Wade–Giles: Hsiao E/O; "Petulia" in the English translation of the novel) (He Saifei) and Qiuyi (Note: simplified Chinese: 秋仪; traditional Chinese: 秋儀; pinyin: Qiū Yí; Wade–Giles: Chiu I - "Autumn Grace" in the novel's English translation) (Wang Ji), have recently been sent to a re-education camp by the People's Liberation Army. Rebelling against her new life of uniforms and forced re-education, Qiuyi escapes and becomes a kept woman for Laopu (Note: 老浦; Lǎo Pǔ; Lao P'u; 'Old Pu' - "Mr. P'u" in the novel's English version) (Wang Zhiwen). When Qiuyi becomes pregnant, she seeks refuge in a Buddhist temple but is cast out when the nuns discover her pregnancy - soon after, the baby miscarries.

Left in the training camp, Xiao'e undergoes her ideological re-education and emerges from her ordeal as a factory worker. Detesting physical labor, she goes on to marry Laopu and has a child with him, forcing him to steal money from work. When Laopu is caught, he is sentenced to death, and Xiao'e abandons him and her child to remarry. As the film ends, Xiao'E's child is adopted by Qiuyi, who had gone on to marry a simple old teahouse owner.

== Reception ==
Blush was well received by most critics in the West, with Jonathan Rosenbaum of the Chicago Reader calling it the "most emotionally complex picture I've seen from mainland China about the effect of the communist revolution on the lives of ordinary people."
