= Janina Orlov =

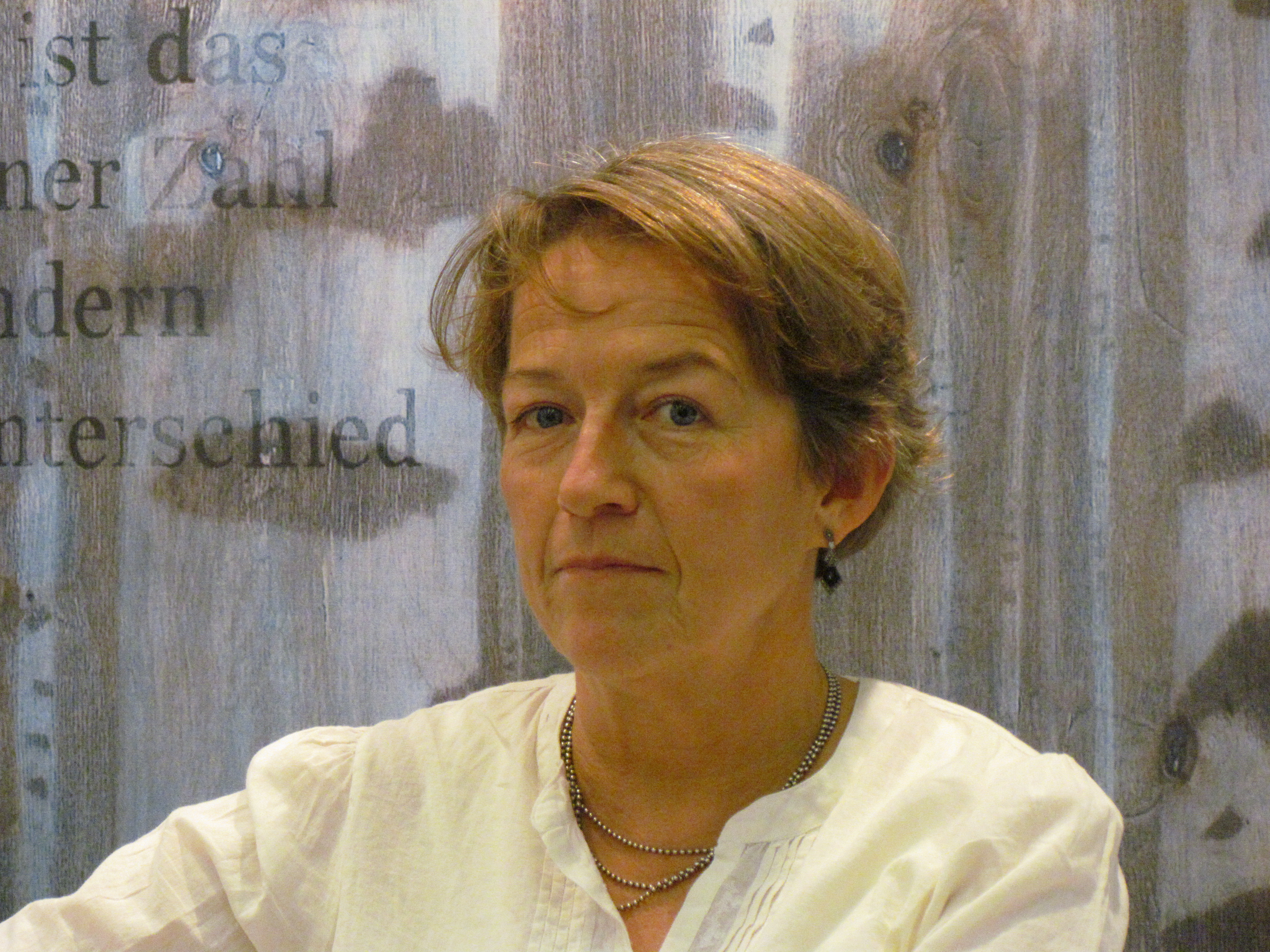
- Orlov in 2011
- Born: 10 February 1955 (age 71); Finland

Janina Maria Orlov (born 10 February 1955) is a Finnish-Swedish translator of literature. She took her PhD in the Russian language in 2005 at Åbo Akademi with a text about Pushkin's The Tale of Tsar Saltan. Orlov translates books from Russian and Finnish to Swedish, and specializes in children's books and youth literature, but also regular literature.

In 2015, Janina Orlov won a 15,000 Euro prize for her work with Finnish literature.

She was married to Ulf Stark.

== Bibliography ==
- Texten som kalejdoskop: en läsning av A. S. Pusjkins "Sagan om tsar Saltan". Åbo: Åbo Akademis publishers. Libris 10025554. ISBN 951-765-266-6 (2014)
