= Qiu Xiaolong =

American poet

Qiu Xiaolong 裘小龙
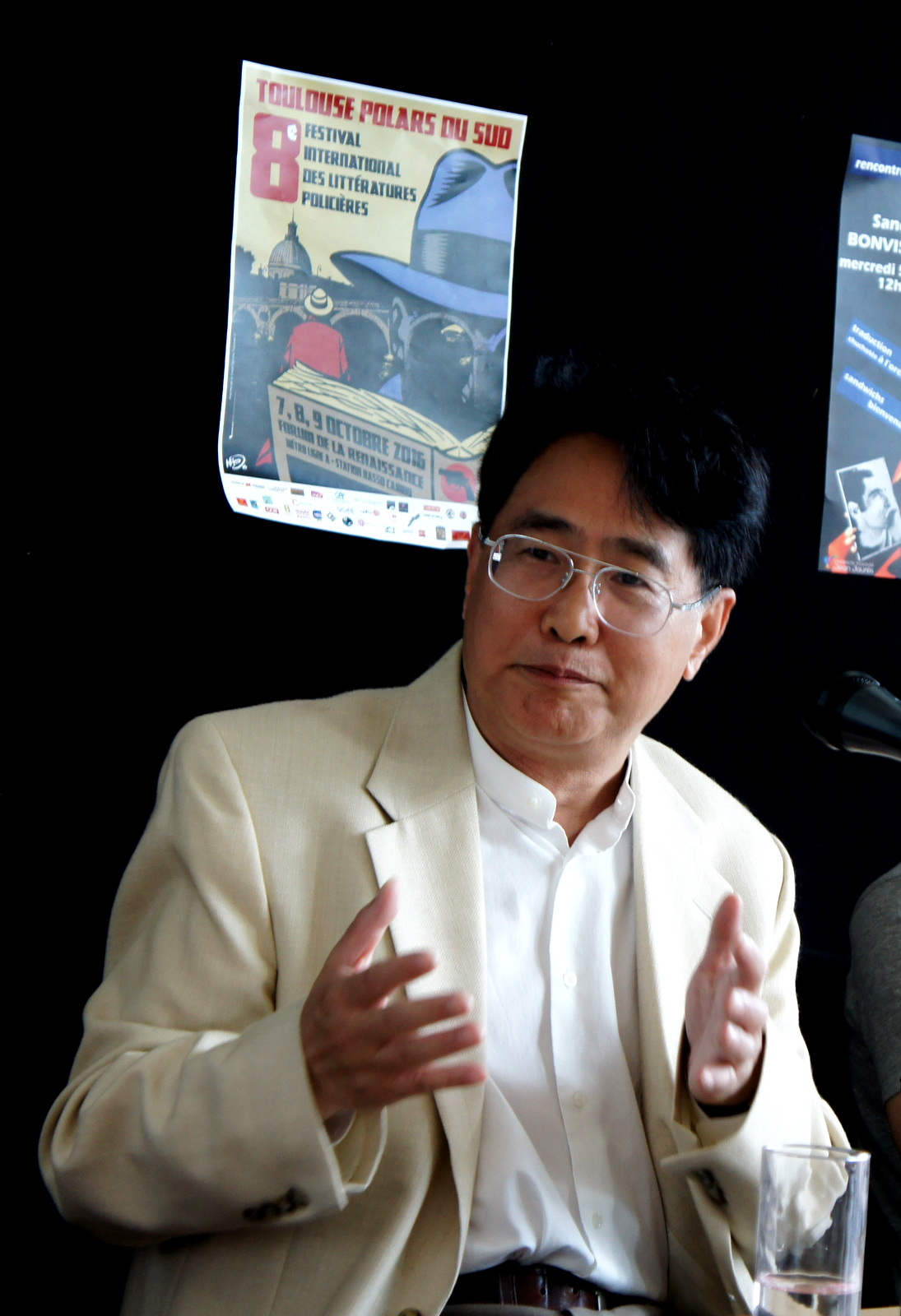
- Qiu in 2016
- Born: 1953 (age 72–73); Shanghai, China
- Education: East China Normal University (BA 1978) Chinese Academy of Social Sciences (MA 1981) Washington University in St. Louis (MA 1993) (PhD 1995)
- Writing career
- Period: 2000–present
- Genres: Crime, poetry, translation
- Notable awards: Anthony Award for Best First Novel; 2001 Death of a Red Heroine
- Website: www.qiuxiaolong.com

Qiu Xiaolong (Chinese: 裘小龙, Chinese pronunciation /tɕʰjoʊː ˌɕjɑʊˈlʊŋ/, American English pronunciation /ˈtʃuː ˌʃaʊˈlɒŋ/) is a Chinese American crime novelist, poet, translator, critic, and academic. Born in Shanghai, he originally visited the United States in 1988 to write a book about T. S. Eliot, but remained in the US following the 1989 Tiananmen Square protests and massacre.

He has published fourteen crime-thriller/mystery novels as part of the Inspector Chen Cao series. These include Death of a Red Heroine, which won the Anthony Award for best first novel in 2001, and A Loyal Character Dancer. All books follow Shanghai Chief Inspector Chen Cao, a poetry-quoting cop who writes poems himself, and his sidekick Detective Yu. Alongside the plot, the major concern in the books is modern China itself. Each book features quotes from ancient and modern poets, Confucius, insights into Chinese cuisine, architecture, history, politics, herbology and philosophy as well as criminal procedure.

== Life ==
=== Life in China ===
Qiu says his father was an "accidental capitalist": in the late 1940s the trading company his father worked for went bankrupt and as severance received a case of unsold perfume essence. His father taught himself how to make perfume and started a small perfume factory in Shanghai. The factory was transferred to the state in the mid-1950s, following the communist takeover of China, and thereafter his father was a manual laborer in a state-run factory.

The Cultural Revolution began in 1966, and the family was branded as "black", part of the counter-revolutionary class. The Red Guard searched their home for two days, taking away anything regarded as decadent (jewelry, books, even electric fans); Qiu's mother had a nervous breakdown, from which she never really recovered. Qiu's father came home at times with bruises from being attacked at work. Then his father suffered an acute retinal detachment and was hospitalized. In order to be eligible for eye surgery, his father had to write a confession of guilt for his capitalist bourgeois sins; but it was not deemed sufficiently repentant. So the teenage Qiu re-wrote it, using melodramatic language and framing his father's capitalist sins as no accident. It seemed to work, as soon after his father received his surgery. Ironically, Qiu says, "The Red Guard’s approval of my father’s confession gave me some confidence in my writing".

Qiu's older brother (Qiu Xiaowei), handicapped from childhood due to infantile paralysis, also suffered a breakdown during the Cultural Revolution, being unable to work or study (the schools all being shut down). The brother is still hospitalized, and Qiu makes regular trips to Shanghai to visit him. He also has a younger sister, Xiaohong.

At age 16, Qiu would have been sent to the countryside to be "re-educated", but was allowed to stay in Shanghai because he suffered from bronchitis. With schools closed, Qiu spent his time practicing Tai Chi in the park on the Bund; one day, he noticed people studying English on a park bench and decided to join them. This interest in English grew into his academic specialty: he got a B.A. in English from East China Normal University (1978), an M.A. in English Literature from the Chinese Academy of Social Sciences (1981), and was an Assistant and Associate Research Professor at the Shanghai Academy of Social Sciences (1986 – 1988).

In 1988, prior to a fellowship in the United States, he married his wife Wang Lijun.

=== Life in the United States ===
In 1988, Qiu went on a Ford Foundation grant to Washington University in St. Louis to work on a book about T.S. Eliot. Eliot was born in St. Louis, and his grandfather founded the university.

But in 1989, Qiu and fellow Chinese academics were stunned to watch TV reports of the severe government crackdown of the Tiananmen Square protests. On July 4, Qiu was volunteering at a St. Louis fair, selling egg rolls as a fundraiser for Chinese student protesters, when he overheard a Voice of America broadcast describing him as "a published poet who supported the democratic movement in China." Subsequent signs suggested Qiu might have trouble if he returned to China: his sister was visited by the Shanghai police who told her "to tell me to behave myself"; and he learned that his latest poetry book, already at the galley stage, would not be published. So Qiu made the momentous choice to stay in the United States, and arranged for his wife to come a month later. The next year, his daughter Julia was born in St. Louis.

Qiu enrolled as student at Washington University in St. Louis and earned an M.A. (1993) and Ph.D. (1995) in Comparative Literature. From 1996 to 2005 he was an adjunct professor there. He and his family continue to live in St. Louis.

== Writing career ==
=== Career ===
Qiu began writing poems in Chinese in 1978, studying under the poet Bian Zhilin (卞之琳). While an academic in China, Qiu wrote poetry and scholarly articles, and translated work by the modernist poet T.S. Eliot into Chinese, including The Waste Land and The Love Song of J. Alfred Prufrock. Eliot has been a major influence on Qiu, both in his poetry and, more obliquely, in his detective novels. Eliot's "impersonal theory", as opposed to the romantic tradition, holds that the poet should not identify himself with the persona of the poem. Likewise, Inspector Chen of his novels has some of Qiu's traits but is not him, "embracing the tension between the impersonal and personal."

With Qiu's 1989 decision to stay in the United States for political reasons, publishing in China became difficult and he began writing mostly in English. After Qiu finished his Ph.D. in 1995, he visited China again after a long absence. He was impressed by the astounding social changes in the country, with newly minted capitalists becoming darlings and old socialist norms fading. He tried to express some of this in a long poem “Don Quixote in China,” but was not very satisfied with the result. So he decided that a novel was better for describing "this type of dramatic change -- you can call it 'best of times, worst of times'". Never having written a novel before, and writing it in his second language of English, he latched onto the "detective story as a ready-made framework". Thus was born his protagonist Inspector Chen Cao, like Qiu a Chinese poet and translator from Shanghai who studied English literature, but also a policeman. Qiu says, "A cop needs to walk around, knock on people's doors and talk to various people. This particular cop is very helpful because he's an intellectual. He's not only going to catch a murderer; he also tries to think what's wrong historically, socially, culturally — in what kind of a context did this tragedy occur?"

Qiu's first Inspector Chen novel, Death of a Red Heroine, garnered him the 2001 Anthony Award for Best First Novel by a mystery writer. and The Wall Street Journal ranked it as the third best political novel of all time. It was based in part on an actual sex and drug scandal from the early 1990s. Up to 2019, Qiu has written eleven Inspector Chen novels. The early novels are often occupied with legacies of the Cultural Revolution. The series has tried to keep up with the continuing changes in China. Qiu goes back regularly to visit, watches Chinese TV via satellite, and reads Chinese newspapers over the internet. The seventh novel, Don't Cry, Tai Lake touches on environmental contamination in modern China. Discussions and revelations on Chinese microblogs (Weibo) inspired some of the eighth novel, The Enigma of China. The scandals and downfall of the high Chinese official Bo Xilai formed a basis for the ninth novel, Shanghai Redemption.

In many of the Inspector Chen novels, Qiu portrays traditional Shanghai life amidst the old alleyways and also how it is rapidly disappearing with modernization. These are also themes in two of his other works: Red Dust is a set of short stories about the inhabitants of a small lane in Shanghai, spanning Mao's rise to the return of capitalism; Disappearing Shanghai combines intimate black-and-white photos of older Shanghai with poems by Qiu. Qiu visits his old family house in Shanghai occasionally; frozen in time, it is filled with old carved furniture and devoid of plumbing (having instead a chamber pot).

=== Influence and style ===
Cultural background is a major influence in Qiu' s novels. From the Cultural Revolution to the reform and opening up, his writing reflects the society during those times. For Qiu, a lot of the writing is inspired by his own childhood experiences. Qiu also writes about Chinese cuisine in his novels, which gives Western readers a glimpse into Chinese food culture, and the Chinese people, as the Chinese people in Qiu's novels are not portrayed as the stereotypical characters who are ignorant and foolish, living an exotic lifestyle. Rather, he portrays a range of realistic characters who are talented, virtuous, and open-minded.

One of the most significant stylistic symbols in Qiu Xiaolong' s novel is that he incorporates a lot of poetic writing, which stylistically owes more to Eliot and Yeats than it does to classical Chinese verse.

Qiu's teacher, Bian ZhiLin, significantly influenced him on his career path as well. When he was pursuing his master's degree, he started writing poems when his teacher Bian suggested him to do so. Furthermore, following Bian's footstep, Qiu started to write novels in English as Bian was writing English novels instead of Chinese novels.

Qiu believes it is an advantage rather than a disadvantage to write from a distance, which reflects the fact that he is writing about China from a distance. One may see from an angle what those living in the place fail to see. According to Qiu, he is using his detective novels as a scope to view Chinese society, raising important political and social issues about contemporary China. As he said:

“The 'protagonist' of my novel is actually China, whereas the detective fictions are just the masks--the Western society has many bias and misunderstanding when they are introducing China. I hope to portray parts of the true China using English, and talk about the changes and confusions Chinese people are experiencing during the period of social transition."

=== Comments and critiques ===
==== Comments ====
His series of novels featuring Shanghai Inspector Chen Cao has been praised for its accurate portrayal of modern life in communist China, where a difficult transition toward a more Western society and capitalist economy conflicts with traditional Chinese values and a still-oppressive and bureaucratic government.

Many reviewers concluded that Qiu's descriptions of China and its society were the most interesting parts of the book, and that the murder mystery serves as a device to paint the nation's portrait. Connie Fletcher, writing in Booklist, declared that the book was "fascinating for what it reveals about China as well as what it reveals about a complex man in this setting."

==== Critiques ====
Qiu Xiaolong's work has been criticized by Chinese critics and readers who claim that his depiction of China is not real as his target audience is primarily Western readers. Some Chinese critics have complained that Qiu's content plays to orientalism that appeals to Western perceptions of China, utilizing cultural elements like folklore, ancient poetry, and cuisine. Critics also argue that Qiu's novels lack deductive reasoning and suspenseful enough plot to be considered a worthy detective story.

==== Self-critique by Qiu ====
Qiu's themes often revolve around corruption in China. He has claimed that since the Communist party has taken over control of the media, the internet has become an important and effective way for people to speak out for justice in spite of constant censorship. He has argued that political reform in China would be impossible despite dramatic economic changes. His detective novels’ protagonist Inspector Chen often uncovers corruption while investigating case, which turns his idealism toward pessimism about the Chinese political system. He also has commented that his love of incorporating authentic regional Chinese food into his fiction is related to feelings of nostalgia, such as Marcel Proust famously does in Remembrance of Things Past; and that traditional food in present China still exists because of the food-safety scandals.

== Awards ==
- Ford Foundation grant, 1988
- Missouri Arts Council Writers Biennial Award, for poetry, 1994
- Named Among Best Ten Books of 2000
- Anthony Award for best first novel for Death of a Red Heroine, 2001
- Bouchercon for Death of a Red Heroine, 2001

== Books ==
=== Inspector Chen Cao series ===
1. Death of a Red Heroine (2000)
2. A Loyal Character Dancer (2002)
3. When Red Is Black (2004)
4. A Case of Two Cities (2006)
5. Red Mandarin Dress (2007)
6. The Mao Case (2009)
7. Don't Cry, Tai Lake (2012)
8. Enigma of China (2013)
9. Shanghai Redemption (2015)
10. Hold Your Breath, China (2019)
11. Becoming Inspector Chen (2020)
12. Inspector Chen and the Private Kitchen Murder (2021)
13. Love and Murder in the Time of Covid (2023)
14. The Secret Sharers (2025)

==== Adaptations ====
Ten of the Inspector Chen novels were adapted as BBC Radio 4 dramas from 2015 to 2019, starring Jamie Zubairi as Chen and Dan Li as Detective Yu. The adaptations were handled by Joy Wilkinson (Death of a Red Heroine, Red Mandarin Dress, The Mao Case, Don't Cry, Tai Lake and Hold Your Breath, China) and John Harvey (A Loyal Character Dancer, When Red is Black, A Case of Two Cities, Enigma of China and Shanghai Redemption).

In 2011, it was announced that the Inspector Chen novels would be adapted into a series of seven feature films, to be made as a co-production between Australia and China. There has been no further word on the project since then.

In 2019, The Mao Case was adapted into a French graphic novel as "La Danseuse de Mao" ("A Dancer for Chairman Mao").

=== Judge Dee series ===
1. The Shadow of the Empire: A Judge Dee Investigation (2021)
2. The Conspiracies of the Empire: A Judge Dee Investigation (2024)

=== Other books ===
- Lines Around China (poetry collection) (2003)
- Years of Red Dust (2010)
- Disappearing Shanghai (2012), with photos by Howard W. French

=== Poetry translations ===
- Treasury of Chinese Love Poems (2003)
- 100 Poems from Tang and Song Dynasties (2006)
- Evoking T'ang: An Anthology of Classical Chinese Poetry (2007)
- Lines Around China: Lines Out Of China (2008)
- 100 Classic Chinese Poems (2010)
- Disappearing Shanghai: Photographs and Poems of an Intimate Way of Life (2012)
- Poems of Inspector Chen (2016)

== See also ==
- History of Chinese Americans in St. Louis
