= Ji-li Jiang =

Chinese author

- 蒋吉丽
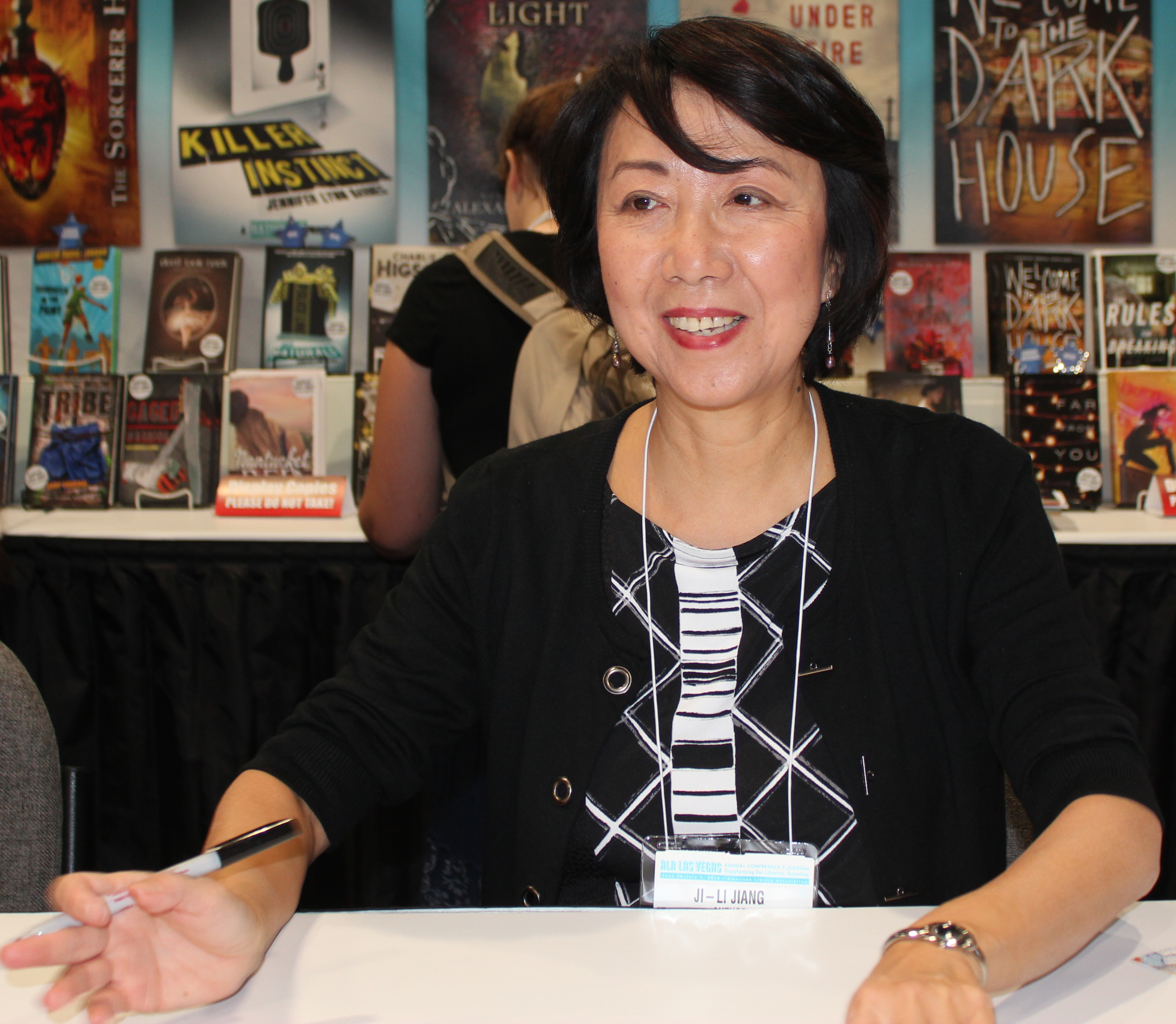
- Jiang in 2014
- Born: February 2, 1954 (age 72); Shanghai, China
- Education: Shanghai Teacher's College
- Alma mater: Shanghai University; University of Hawaiʻi
- Occupations: Science teacher, writer
- Writing career
- Language: English, Chinese
- Genres: Fiction, Memoir, Non-fiction
- Notable work: Red Scarf Girl
- Website: www.jilijiang.com

Ji-li Jiang
- Simplified Chinese: 蒋吉丽
- Traditional Chinese: 蔣吉麗
Transcriptions
Standard Mandarin
- Hanyu Pinyin: Jiǎng Jílì

Ji-li Jiang (born February 2, 1954) is a Chinese author. She is most famous for the memoir, Red Scarf Girl, as well as The Magical Monkey King. She grew up and lived in Shanghai, China in a large apartment with her family.

== Early life ==
Jiang lived in a roomy apartment with a small bathroom. At this period of time, many other people did not have large apartments such as hers, classifying her as part of the upper class during the Cultural Revolution. During this time period, she lived with her father Jiang Xi-reng, her mother Ying-Chen, her brother Ji-yong, her sister Ji-yun and her grandmother for a brief period of time. Her housekeeper, Song Po-po, also lived with them. Ji-li was a star student until 1966, when Chairman Mao started the Cultural Revolution. When she was 13, her father, a theater owner was falsely accused of counter-revolutionary crimes and was detained and forced to do hard labor by the Chinese government. Ji-li was humiliated by her peers at school who blamed her for her family's "black", or "anticommunist" past, which prevented her from becoming a Red Successor, a person who would be appointed as a Red Guard when they were old enough.

When the Revolution ended, Jiang moved to Hawaii, later followed by most of her family. In 1998, Red Scarf Girl, a memoir of her life during the Cultural Revolution, was published and garnered a number of awards. Following the success of Red Scarf Girl, Jiang continued writing books, notably The Magical Monkey King, a retelling of a traditional Chinese tale about the beginning of the trickster Monkey King's journey.

== Adulthood ==
Jiang graduated from Shanghai Teacher's College and Shanghai University before moving to Hawaii in 1984. She graduated from the University of Hawaiʻi and began working as an operations analyst for a hotel chain. Jiang became a budget director for a healthcare company in Chicago. In 1992, she co-founded East-West Exchange, promoting cultural exchange between western countries and China. In 2003, she started a nonprofit organization, Cultural Exchange International, to continue and expand the cultural exchanges with the U.S. and other Western countries. Jiang currently resides in San Francisco, California.

== Books ==
- Lotus and Feather
- The Magical Monkey King
- Red Kite, Blue Kite
- Red Scarf Girl
- Ji-li's Life in America
