= Su Tong =

Chinese writer (born 1963)

Tong Zhonggui
- 童忠贵
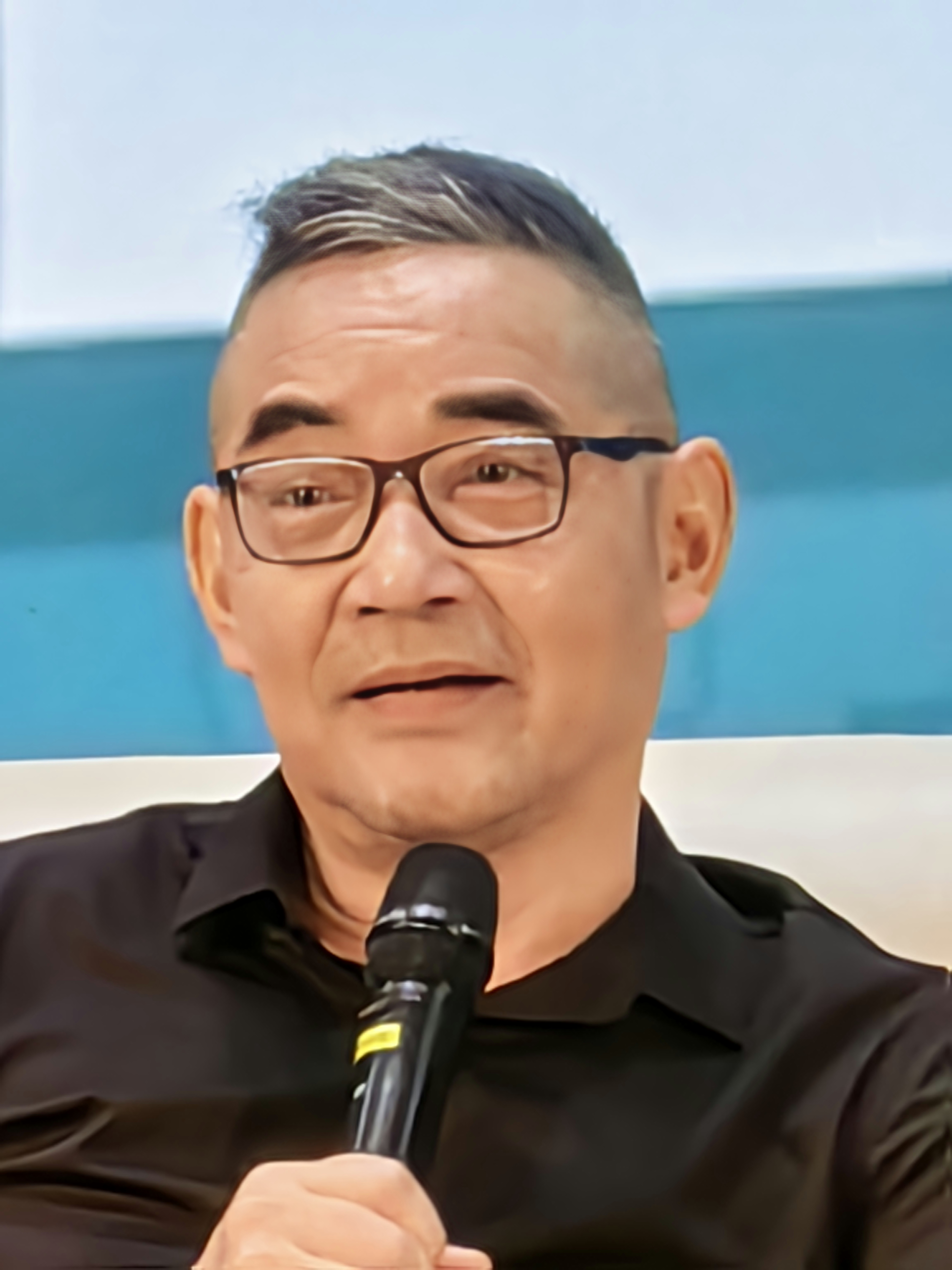
- Born: January 1963 (age 63); Suzhou, Jiangsu, China
- Education: Beijing Normal University
- Occupation: Novelist
- Writing career
- Pen name: Su Tong (苏童)
- Language: Chinese
- Period: 1980–present
- Genre: Novel
- Notable work: Shadow of the Hunter
- Notable awards: 9th Mao Dun Literature Prize; 2015 Shadow of the Hunter

Su Tong
- Simplified Chinese: 苏童
- Traditional Chinese: 蘇童
Transcriptions
Standard Mandarin
- Hanyu Pinyin: Sū Tóng
- Wade–Giles: Su^{1} T'ung^{2}

Tong Zhonggui
- Chinese: 童忠贵
Transcriptions
Standard Mandarin
- Hanyu Pinyin: Tóng Zhōngguì
- Wade–Giles: T'ung^{2} Chung^{1}-kuei^{4}

Tong Zhonggui (Chinese: 童忠贵; pinyin: Tóng Zhōngguì; born January 23, 1963), known by the pen name of Su Tong (苏童; 蘇童; Sū Tóng) is a Chinese writer. He was born in Suzhou and lives in Nanjing.

He entered the Department of Chinese at Beijing Normal University in 1980, and started to publish novels in 1983. He is now vice president of the Jiangsu Writers Association. Known for his controversial writing style, Su is one of the most acclaimed novelists in China. His novella, Raise the Red Lantern (1990), was adapted into a film of the same name by Zhang Yimou in 1991.

== Work ==
Su has written seven full-length novels and over 200 short stories, some of which have been translated into English, German, Italian and French.

He is best known in the West for his novella Raise the Red Lantern (originally titled Wives and Concubines), published in 1990. The book was adapted into the film, Raise the Red Lantern by director Zhang Yimou. The book has since been published under the name given to the film in the English version and in some other versions. His other works available in English translation are Rice, My Life as Emperor, Petulia's Rouge Tin (Hongfen in Chinese), Binu and the Great Wall (tr. Howard Goldblatt), Madwoman on the Bridge and Other Stories, Tattoo: Three Novellas and The Boat to Redemption, also translated by Goldblatt.

His novel Petulia's Rouge Tin, about two Shanghai prostitutes at the time of Liberation in 1949, has been adapted to two films: Li Shaohong's Blush (Hongfen, 1994) and Huang Shuqin's Rouged Beauties (Hongfen Jiaren, 1995).

In 2009, he was awarded the Man Asian Literary Prize for his work The Boat to Redemption, the second Chinese writer to win the prize.

In 2011, Su Tong was nominated to win the Man Booker International Prize. In 2015, he was a co-winner of the Mao Dun Literature Prize for Shadow of the Hunter.

== Selected works in translation ==
- Midnight Stories. Translator Honey Watson. Horsham: Sinoist Books. November 2024.
- Missives from the Masses. Translator Josh Stenberg. Horsham: Sinoist Books. February 2024. ISBN 9781838905651
- Open-Air Cinema: Reminiscences and Micro-Essays from the Author of Raise the Red Lantern. Translators Haiwang Yuan, James Trapp, Nicky Harman, Olivia Milburn. Horsham: Sinoist Books. October 2021. ISBN 9781838905248
- Shadow of the Hunter. Translator James Trapp. London: ACA Publishing. May 2020. ISBN 9781838905057
- Petulia's Rouge Tin. Translated by Jane Weizhen Pan; Martin Merz. Penguin Specials. 2018.
- Tattoo: Three Novellas. Translated by Josh Stenberg. Portland, Me.: MerwinAsia. 2010. ISBN 9780552774543.
- The Boat to Redemption. Translated by Howard Goldblatt. London: Black Swan. July 2010. ISBN 9780552774543.
- Binu and the Great Wall of China. Translated by Howard Goldblatt. Edinburgh: Canongate Books. August 2009.
- Madwoman on the Bridge. Translated by Josh Stenberg. London: Black Swan. August 2008. ISBN 9780552774529.
- My Life as Emperor. Translated by Howard Goldblatt. Hyperion East. 2005.
- Rice. Translated by Howard Goldblatt. New York: Perennial. 2004. ISBN 0060596325.
- Raise the Red Lantern: Three Novellas. Translated by Michael S. Duke. New York: Penguin Books. 1996. ISBN 0140260307.
  - Includes Raise the Red Lantern, Nineteen Thirty-four Escapes, and Opium Family.
