= When Red Is Black =

2004 novel by Qiu Xiaolong

First edition (publ. Soho Press)

When Red is Black is Qiu Xiaolong's third Inspector Chen mystery and discusses the everyday life of modern China from a police perspective.
