= Red Scarf Girl =

Book by Ji-li Jiang

- First edition
- Author: Ji-li Jiang
- Translator: Ji-li Jiang
- Cover artist: Hilary Zarycky
- Language: English
- Genre: Historical Memoir
- Publisher: HarperCollins
- Publication date: 1997
- Publication place: United States
- Media type: Print (Hardcover & Paperback)
- Pages: 285
- ISBN: 978-0-06-446208-2
- OCLC: 36407715

Red Scarf Girl is a historical memoir written by Ji-li Jiang about her experiences during the Cultural Revolution of China, with a foreword by David Henry Hwang.

Ji-li Jiang was very important in her classroom and was respected until 1966 when the Cultural Revolution started.

In Red Scarf Girl, Ji-li was at the top of her class and the da-dui-zhang, or Student Council President, of her school. However, her father prevents her from auditioning for the Central Liberation Army Arts Academy due to their political status, which she had no knowledge of at the time. Her family is considered a "Black Family," because her grandfather was a landlord and her father was considered a "rightist", though her father reassured her that he is not. Many people accuse Ji-li of her family's old ways, or "Four Olds" and the "Five Black Categories" that Chairman Mao Zedong protests against. Ji-li must deal with the difficult choice between her educational and political future or her family. This book describes her experiences with the Cultural Revolution, including being betrayed by her classmates, helping to destroy the Four Olds, attempting to become a Red Guard and the constant terror of arrest. Though, towards the end, Jiang Ji-li realizes that her goals no longer define her but rather her responsibilities.

== Development ==
Jiang decided to write while she was in a training program for managing hotels; she felt inspiration from reading The Diary of a Young Girl by Anne Frank while at university but at the time did not have sufficient free time to begin writing on her own. She cited a goal to educate Americans about China as a motive for writing the book.

== Summary ==
At the setting, during the summer, the Cultural Revolution has just begun. The story scopes on Ji-Li Jiang, the main character of the story. Ji-li is very happy and excited when a Liberation Army Officer comes to her school and shows her approval of Ji-li's handstand. Principal Long invites her and other students to audition. She passes the test and is very excited to tell her parents about the good news. However, Ji-li is dissuaded by her parents, who know their "black" background will prevent her from making it in, and everyone at school will know her family's political status.

The Campaign Against the "Four Olds" is illustrated when she, her younger brother and sister, her friends, and her classmates watch as a crowd tears down a "superstitious" store sign and enthusiastically destroys it. The Da-zi-bao craze then begins, and everyone in her class is assigned to write these posters. Some very easily write horrendous slanders against the teachers, but Ji-li cannot bring herself to insult her teachers. One day, she sees a da-zi-bao implying she has a relationship with a male teacher, and her parents tell her to stay at home to avoid embarrassment. When she comes to school again, she is nominated to become a Red Successor for the future generation of Red Guards but her bad class background is revealed to the class by Du Hai, the boy in her class described as "trouble" by Ji-li, and she is excluded from the nomination. Ji-li finds out that her grandfather is a landlord and her father is being labeled a rightist, although he is not. She is devastated because of this, but knows she can do nothing about it because her father informed her earlier in the book that it was not a good idea to audition and try out even though she had good potential.

The summer starts off a bit disappointing for Ji-li because graduation tests are terminated, but she then finds out that she is going to Shi-yi Junior High School because of her teachers' recommendations. Unfortunately, her teacher's recommendations to schools become invalidated and everyone in her neighborhood is forced to go to Xin-zha Junior High School because of the region that they had residence in. Soon, the campaign started promoting house searches for "Four Olds" items and treasures. Song Po-po, their housekeeper, is eventually fired due to the family's fear of being accused of exploiting workers. Then, the Red Guards find a knife in the garbage with some of their family's suspicious burnt photos. Six Fingers accompanied by several Red Guards start their raid when the Jiangs are asleep. Their house is trashed and they lose many of their things that were considered part of the "Four Olds".

Ji-li comes to junior high school after the summer. Her father is detained for "establishing counterrevolutionary ties" and "listening to foreign radio". Her mother's salary is also reduced. Their family is going through their darkest ages. All schools are then closed and Ji-li and her classmates are sent to the countryside to work on the fields. She comes back and takes care of her family, choosing not to betray her father when requested to criticize him. When the Red Guards come to search their house for an incriminating letter and evidence of their luxurious, "bourgeois" lifestyle and exploitation of others, they destroy and take away many of their belongings. However, they manage to hold on and not give up. Eventually, Ji-Li moves to the United States of America. Ji-li started a company to bring the western and Chinese cultures together, the East West Exchange. East West Exchange, Inc was founded by Ji-li in 1992. Its mission is to promote and facilitate cultural and business exchange between China and the West. East West Exchange, Inc. is honored to be the overseas agent of Shanghai TV Station, Shanghai Eastern Radio Station, Shanghai Welfare Institute and China Travel Service.

== Reception ==
Publishers Weekly stated that the book's "clarity" is not inhibited by its "passionate tone", and that using non-overt ways to criticize political corruption and authoritarianism was an astute technique.

Kirkus Reviews stated that the book is "a very painful, very personal—therefore accessible—history."

Cindy Kane of Common Sense Media recommended the book for persons ages twelve and older and ranked it four of five stars.

== See also ==
- Red scarf
