= Jimmy Sham =

Hong Kong political and human rights activist

- 岑子杰
- Sham in 2020

Member of the Sha Tin District Council
- In office 1 January 2020 – 8 July 2021
- Preceded by: Wong Yue-hon
- Constituency: Lek Yuen

Convener of Civil Human Rights Front
- In office October 2018 – October 2020
- Preceded by: Sammy Ip
- Succeeded by: Figo Chan Ho-wun
- In office October 2015 – October 2016
- Preceded by: Daisy Chan
- Succeeded by: Au Nok-hin

Vice-chairman of the League of Social Democrats
- In office 2020–2021
- Preceded by: Jaco Chow
- Succeeded by: Yu Wai-pun

Personal details
- Born: 29 June 1987 (age 39) British Hong Kong
- Party: Independent
- Other political affiliations: League of Social Democrats (until 2025)
- Education: Hong Kong Community College

Chinese name
- Chinese: 岑子杰
Transcriptions
Standard Mandarin
- Hanyu Pinyin: Cén Zǐjié
- Bopomofo: ㄘㄣˊ ㄗˇ ㄐㄧㄝˊ
- Wade–Giles: Tsʻen^{2} Tzu^{3}-chʻieh^{2}
- Tongyong Pinyin: Cén Zǐh-jié
- IPA: [tsʰə̌n tsɹ̩̀.tɕjě]
Yue: Cantonese
- Jyutping: sam4 zi2 git6

Jimmy Sham Tsz-kit (Chinese: 岑子杰; Jyutping: sam4 zi2 git6; born 29 June 1987) is a Hong Kong pro-democracy and LGBT rights activist. He served as a convener for the pro-democracy organisation Civil Human Rights Front (CHRF) until October 2020 and serves as a secretary for the LGBT rights organisation Rainbow of Hong Kong. He is a longtime member of the League of Social Democrats. In 2019 he was elected to the Sha Tin District Council by residents of Lek Yuen constituency, but he resigned from this position in July 2021 amidst a government crackdown on pro-democracy councillors.

== Biography ==
Sham grew up in a single-parent family and completed secondary school in 2006. He worked as a legislative assistant for a period after graduating from secondary school. He later joined Rainbow Action, a member organisation of Civil Human Rights Front that advocates for LGBT rights. He started assisting with CHRF's work in 2008, hosting events and managing affairs with human and police rights. He occupied Connaught Road Central along with other protesters after the 1 July march in 2011, after which he was arrested for unlawful assembly. He participated in the 2014 Hong Kong protests and became CHRF's convener in 2015, for one year.

After Sham left the post of convener, he studied at the Hong Kong Community College, graduating in October 2018 with a higher diploma in social work. He immediately rejoined CHRF, again as convener. This came at a difficult time for the organisation, as it had only HK$300,000 in funding with a monthly expenditure of HK$20,000. He is a longtime member of the League of Social Democrats and joined its executive committee in 2018. He first joined the party because it was the first in Hong Kong to include LGBT issues in its platform.

In 2020, Time magazine named Sham one of "20 people to watch", the only Hong Kong citizen on the list. He responded, "Hong Kong people deserve more attention from the outside world than themselves."

=== Sexuality ===
Sham is openly gay; he married his husband, a flight attendant, in New York in 2014. He is an active campaigner for LGBT rights in Hong Kong. As a secretary, he manages daily operations for Rainbow of Hong Kong, helps organise annual LGBT rallies and hosted an LGBT programme on Citizens' Radio. Sham was also the spokesperson for the 2018 Hong Kong Pride Parade, which drew 12,000 people, a record high.

Sham has resorted to the courts to have his New York marriage recognised in Hong Kong. In September 2020, he lost his first judicial review, and lost the case before the Court of Appeal in August 2022, while awaiting trial over the mass national security law case. On 11 November 2022, Sham's lawyer Hectar Pun resorted to the High Court as a last resort for his petition to be heard, after a panel of three judges determined that the matter was of "great general public importance".

In September 2023, the Court of Final Appeal rejected Sham's appeal for recognition of same-sex marriage. However, the Court ordered the government to work on a framework of recognition within two years from the moment of the appeal.

=== 2019–2020 Hong Kong protests ===
As convener of Civil Human Rights Front, Sham helped organise the first and second protest marches against the 2019 Hong Kong extradition bill on 31 March and 28 April, and helped organise the protest march against the bill on 9 June. The number of participants at this march exceeded his expectations: CHRF set a target of 300,000 protesters, and he estimated that more than a million people participated. On 13 June, after the Hong Kong government's announcement of its intention to restart debating the bill, as well as the clashes at the Legislative Council (LegCo), Sham decided to organize another protest march on 16 June, which meant they had only four days to advertise it. He estimated that there were close to two million participants at the 16 June protest. Sham noted that CHRF is unable to mobilise large numbers of people to participate in protests, and that the high number of protesters in the 2019 protests was caused by public awareness and poor governance by the Hong Kong government. He described CHRF's role in the protests as providing a platform for citizens to express their views. He said that CHRF estimates participants at protests by counting the participants from footbridges. Sham organised the 1 July march in 2019, demanding a full retraction of the amendment bill and for Chief Executive Carrie Lam to step down.

=== 2019 District Council elections ===
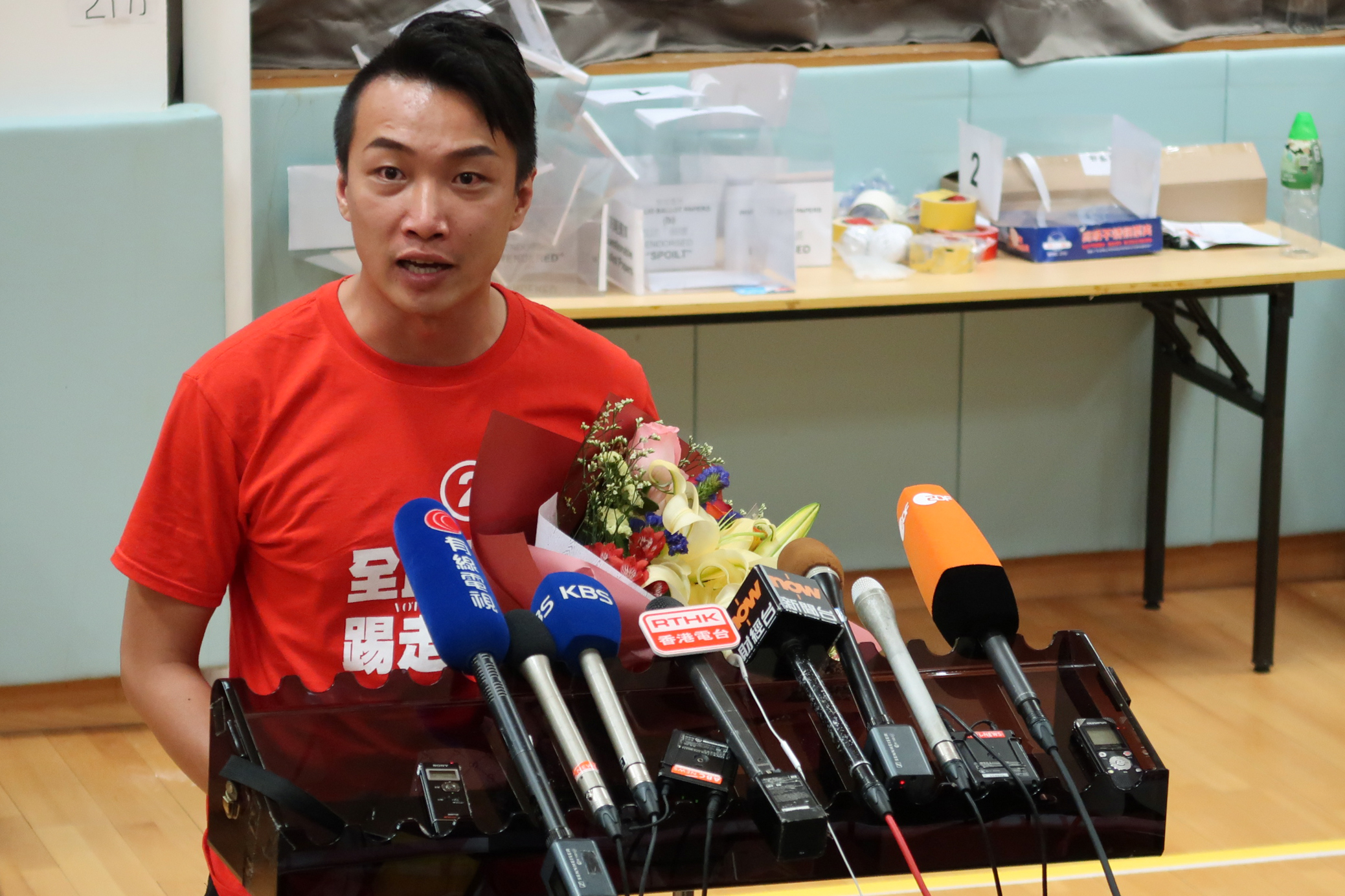
Sham speaking to the press after winning his seat on the Sha Tin District Council.

Sham was elected to the Sha Tin District Council during the 2019 District Council elections. He represents the pro-democracy League of Social Democrats in Lek Yuen constituency. His campaign activities were temporarily disrupted by the October 2019 attack, but he returned to the streets to campaign on crutches. Sham was elected on 24 November 2019, unseating incumbent Michael Wong Yue-hon of the pro-Beijing Civil Force.

=== 2020 pro-democracy primaries ===
Sham ran as a candidate of the League of Social Democrats for Kowloon West during the pro-democracy primaries of July 2020 and won the election with 24,144 votes, 31.82% of the electorate.

=== 2020 legislative council election ===
On 30 July 2020, 12 candidates were disqualified by the Hong Kong government, and it was also announced that the rest of the candidacies were still being reviewed, with some saying that most of the pro-democracy camp were to be disqualified.

On 31 July, Chief Executive Carrie Lam announced that due to the COVID-19 pandemic in Hong Kong, the elections would be postponed for a year without setting a new date.

On 3 August, HK01 reported that Sham and other four others had also been disqualified. Sham said that he was not afraid of disqualification and that he would continue his protests against the national security law. He also received a letter from the electoral commission telling him his nomination was being reviewed.

=== 2021 National Security Law arrest ===
Democracy is never a gift from heaven. It must be earned by many with strong will. We can tell the whole world, under the most painful system, Hong Kongers are the light of the city. We will remain strong and fight for what we want.

— Jimmy Sham as quoted by news outlets such as Al Jazeera and BBC News outside the police station on 28 February 2021.

On 6 January 2021, Sham was arrested along with more than 50 other people accused of violating the national security law. They were all accused of trying to "overthrow" the government and "subversion." Sham was released on bail on 7 January.

On 28 February 2021, Sham, along with 46 others, was formally charged with "subversion" and arrested again. On 4 March and 12 March, he was denied bail due to the concerns of the courts in regards with the national security law.

On 29 March 2021, the High Court adjourned his third bail application until 12 April after one-hour deliberation. On 12 April 2021, the High Court denied him bail and ordered him to remain in custody.

On 13 May 2021, High Court judge Esther Toh upheld her decision to deny bail to Sham arguing that he was a "determined and resolute young man" who could reoffend if granted bail.

On 2 September 2022, Sham pleaded guilty to violating the national security law.

On 19 November 2024, Sham was sentenced to four years and three months in prison. Having been remanded in custody since 28 February 2021, Sham was released from Shek Pik Prison on Lantau Island on 30 May 2025, after 1,548 days in detention. He was in the second batch of defendants in the case to complete their sentences, alongside fellow former district councillors Kinda Li Ka-tat, Roy Tam Hoi-pong and Henry Wong Pak-yu.

=== Resignation as District Councillor ===
On 8 July 2021, more than 76 district councilors resigned their positions, including Sham, citing imminent removal from office under a massive disqualification from the government based on violation of both the Basic Law and the national security law. The League of Social Democrats announced his resignation via a press release.

== Release and subsequent activities ==
Sham arrived at his home in Jordan shortly after 6:20 am on 30 May 2025 under police escort, and gave an impromptu press conference outside the building later that morning. He said he had felt "the warmth from outside the walls" during his imprisonment, that he had experienced periods of unhappiness and helplessness but had gradually recovered, and that he wanted to "remember those who are suffering". Asked whether he considered himself free, he replied that he did not know, adding that he would have to work out afresh where Hong Kong's political "red lines" now lay. He said he had no plans to leave Hong Kong because people important to him remained in the city. Later the same day he returned to Lek Yuen Estate in Sha Tin, the constituency he had represented as a district councillor, saying he felt he had "an unfinished responsibility" there.

On 29 June 2025 the League of Social Democrats, of which Sham had been a member since 2008 and formerly vice-chairman, announced its dissolution in the face of what chairwoman Chan Po-ying described as immense political pressure. Sham attended the party's final press conference, describing his decision to join the party as one he had been proud of and saying he wished to walk the last stretch of the road with it.

=== Aftermath of the same-sex partnership ruling ===
In July 2025 the Constitutional and Mainland Affairs Bureau proposed a registration mechanism open only to same-sex couples already married or in a civil union overseas, granting rights limited chiefly to medical decision-making and the handling of a partner's affairs after death. Sham criticised the proposal on social media, writing that it set out core rights at an "unimaginably low" level and questioning whether it satisfied the Court of Final Appeal's requirement that the framework meet same-sex couples' basic social needs; he identified prison visitation rights and property arrangements as further basic needs the scheme omitted.

On 10 September 2025 the Legislative Council rejected the resulting Registration of Same-sex Partnerships Bill by 71 votes to 14 with one abstention, the first government bill to be defeated in that term of the Council. Sham attended the debate in the public gallery. He wrote afterwards that the non-implementation of the Court of Final Appeal's judgment left the government in breach of its constitutional duty and would become "an unhealed wound", and said he would study the next steps with his legal team. Speaking on Commercial Radio the following day, he said he hoped the government would close the gap in the rule of law as soon as possible. The government said it would not apply to the court to extend the two-year stay of its order.

=== Detention at Haneda Airport ===
On 16 June 2026, travelling to Tokyo with family to mark his birthday, Sham was held for questioning by immigration officers on arrival at Haneda Airport and was admitted only around noon the following day, after roughly 20 to 22 hours. Officers told him that Japanese rules restrict entry by people who have served sentences of more than one year, and questioned him about the basis of his conviction, including whether the case had involved violence; he provided his itinerary, hotel bookings, news reports and court documents to explain that the prosecution was political in nature. The incident was first reported by Sankei Shimbun on 29 June 2026.

Sham said he found it reasonable that frontline officers were unfamiliar with the 47 democrats case and the national security law, comparing it to how few Hong Kong people would recognise the name of a foreign dissident, and described the officers as professional and courteous. He called on the Japanese authorities to establish a clearer declaration mechanism allowing people with political convictions to enter visa-free, and said he had travelled to a number of other countries since his release without comparable difficulty.

== Harassment and physical attacks ==
=== Attack over sexual orientation ===
On 7 July 2019, DAB politician and LegCo member Ann Chiang uploaded a video to Facebook slamming Sham for being gay and alleging that he intentionally concealed his sexuality to gain status with the pan-democracy camp in Hong Kong. The video showed him in drag at an event, with captions "Deliberately concealing that, for power, money or fame?" and "Corrupting social morals, just disgusting." Sham is openly gay and participates in LGBT rights organisations. He responded on social media, criticizing Chiang's attacks and encouraging those remaining in the closet not to feel ashamed of their sexuality. The video was instantly criticized by gay groups and was removed by Facebook for violating its community standards. On 19 July, Sham and LegCo member Raymond Chan Chi-chuen protested in front of the Equal Opportunities Commission together with a number of LGBT rights organisations. The pair submitted a petition with more than 2,000 signatures demanding that EOC chairman Ricky Chu Man-kin condemn Chiang's statements. Chiang later accused Sham of not being "ready" if he considered her comments to be an attack.

Sham was one of the coordinators of a demonstration on 8 December 2019. His attempts to communicate with the Hong Kong Police Force about the demonstration were rejected by the police, who called him a "damn gay man" (死基佬).

=== Attacks during the 2019–2020 Hong Kong protests ===
On 29 August, around 30 people gathered near Rainbow of Hong Kong's headquarters in Jordan, Hong Kong at 11 a.m. for a "Denounce Civil Human Rights Front" demonstration. Sham said the organisers wrongly listed CHRF's address as Rainbow of Hong Kong, and arrived at the venue 10 minutes earlier to talk to the protesters. Some protesters said they were there to oppose CHRF and scolded Sham using foul language. They also pushed apart and scolded reporters there, saying reporters at the scene were "fake". Some supporters of Sham were at the scene as well. During the chaos, several plainclothes law enforcement officers who attempted to separate the two groups of people were also scolded. A group of protesters continued to chant slogans after Sham left the premises, and stopped only after passersby shouted at them to leave. Sham later explained that Rainbow of Hong Kong was not a member organisation of CHRF, and he thought it was funny that protesters insisted on staying there. At 12:50 p.m. that day, Sham and his friend Lo were assaulted by two masked men in a restaurant in Jordan with a softball bat and an iron tube. Sham's friend was hit three times in his arm resulting in swelling, and was sent to hospital; Sham was unharmed. Two men, aged 15 and 44, were later arrested over the attack.

On 16 October, while on the way to a CHRF meeting, Sham was attacked on the street with a hammer by four to five people in Tai Kok Tsui, Kowloon. He was taken, bleeding heavily, to Kwong Wah Hospital.

On 27 July 2020, the trial for the first attack began. The 15-year-old boy charged with attacking Sham and his friend in the first incident told the court that he was given HK$3,000 to attack him while the other defendant, a 29-year-old man, pleaded guilty to conspiracy to cause bodily harm. On 29 July, the 29-year-old said in court that a HK$2 million bounty was offered to "cripple" Sham saying that "some Hongkonger in Tuen Mun wanted to cripple his leg." On 21 September, the 29-year-old was sentenced to 46 months in prison and the teenager to a training centre.

== See also ==
- List of Chinese pro-democracy activists

Political offices
Preceded by Daisy Chan	Convenor of Civil Human Rights Front; 2015–2016	Succeeded by Au Nok-hin
Preceded by Sammy Ip	Convenor of Civil Human Rights Front; 2018–2020	Succeeded by Figo Chan
Preceded by Wong Yue-hon	Member of Sha Tin District Council; Representative for Lek Yuen; 2020–2021	Vacant
Party political offices
Preceded by Jaco Chow	Vice Chairman of League of Social Democrats; 2020–present	Incumbent
