= LGBTQ culture in Hong Kong =

Despite the history of colonisation and the resulting process of Westernization since 1842, Hong Kong still embodies many aspects of Chinese traditional values towards sexuality. It is traditionally believed that heterosexuality is the nature, coherent, and privileged sexuality. Popular media marginalises and discriminates against LGBT members of Hong Kong in an attempt to maintain "traditional lifestyles".

In 1991, the government of Hong Kong legalised male-male same sex relations. Since then LGBT activism has increased, asking for legal protections. A wave of political activism began in the 2000s.

In 2005, the government of Hong Kong conducted a telephone survey with over 2000 persons responding. Of them, 39% indicated that homosexuality "contradicts the morals of the community." 42% of those surveyed in 2005 stated that homosexuals were not "psychologically normal".

A 2012 survey by Community Business had 1,002 respondents chosen at random and 626 persons who identified as LGBT. Of the respondents, chosen randomly, 50% stated that they accepted LGBT individuals while 25% stated they did not; 3% stated that they believed LGBT individuals were not "psychologically normal". Of the LGBT employees, 53% stated that they had to "pretend to be someone they are not" and therefore felt exhaustion, while 26% stated that the work environment did not accept them, so they, at times, had to stay home to work.

According to a survey titled 'The Hong Kong LGBT Climate', conducted by The University of Hong Kong, 25.6% of the respondents stated that they believed LGBT persons are the way they are due to their upbringing and socialisation, while 24.2% of the respondents believed they are 'born that way', and 14.3% believed it is caused by both factors. While nearly half of the respondents personally knew a person from the LGBT community, most of the respondents also stated that they 'would not mind' and 'would not have special feeling' towards LGBT individuals. Most respondents were aware of the discrimination and humiliation which LGBT individuals face in their daily lives; 85% of the respondents supported the idea of promoting inclusiveness of the LGBT community. The survey also included the experiences of Hong Kong LGBT individuals and it is noted that most of them had not fully 'come out' to their family, mostly due to the fear of not being accepted, being shamed, or being rejected by family members. For the same reason, LGBT individuals tended to seek help and support from various social media platforms instead of family members.

By 2012 many individuals who originated from mainland China became a part of Hong Kong's LGBT culture. LGBT marches are legal in Hong Kong, while they are not permitted in many areas in the Mainland. Joanna Chiu and Christy Choi of the South China Morning Post stated that in Hong Kong lesbians stated that conservative lawmakers and Christian groups in Hong Kong make lesbianism less accepted in Hong Kong compared to mainland China, but that Hong Kong lesbians are better able to resist pressures to marry men.

For an extensive (600-page) online bibliography of Hong Kong LGBTQ issues across many subjects, consult Towards Full Citizenship: A Preliminary Checklist of Hong Kong Gay/Lesbian-related Works = 向光明 : 香港同志情形的參考書/片目. Latest edition is the 5th edition (2024), a digital PDF document with link in the previous sentence. (For some earlier editions, variously in print or digital format, check the Library and Archives Canada catalogue, the Internet Archive, or OCLC WorldCat. Some earlier editions are also in print at Hong Kong Public Library, Chinese University of Hong Kong Library and the University of Hong Kong Library).

== Economy ==
=== Housing ===
In Hong Kong, high real estate density is used as a government regulation strategy of land prices. This high land price policy contributes to a limited choice in living environment, and therefore a bigger need to live with other people, often with the immediate family. The family space is regarded as a contentious site for coming out for LGBT Hong Kongers. Living in confined space with the family makes it more difficult for many transgender Hong Kongers to embrace their gender identity and gender expression without the risk of being exposed and encountering family violence.

The family unit in Hong Kong is often reconfigured to include anyone able to contribute economically to the unit in response to the lack of welfare benefits. For LGBT Hong Kongers, these family values makes achieving financial stability into a way to become accepted into the family despite their queer identity. This notion also reveals a larger expectation for LGBT Hong Kongers to embrace self-reliance and individualism in order to survive materially in a society where housing depends on intimate family relations. Heterosexual marriage also becomes a way for LGBT to pursue housing outside of the family unit because of the prioritization of married couples under the Home Ownership Scheme. However, often the idea of moving away from the family can be considered under filial piety as breaking up the family, impacting many LGBT Hong Kongers' decision to continue to live with their family, despite the depression, confusion, and isolation from queer relationships it may result in.

=== Workplace ===
LGBT people experience discrimination in the job interview as well as the workplace. During interviews, LGBT people would be discriminated by their appearance. One example is that an employer raised a question related to interviewee's sex orientation, to which the employee admitted she was a lesbian and she was not hired. The reason of unemployment is that the employer treated her sex orientation as a "trouble" and "abnormal". Besides, transgender people would come across a lot of obstacles during interview. For example, the employer behaves and treats the interviewee differently when they see that the appearance of transgender person differs from the sex shown on their ID card. Even if the transgender person is capable and qualified for the job, they would not be hired because of their ambiguous gender presentation. Not only is there discrimination during the interview, the discrimination continues in the workplace and LGBT people never get an equal treatment. A lesbian who dressed in a suit was hired by a company, but she was required to wear dress. She has no bargaining power and she could be dismissed if she rejects the request to wear dress. LGBT people are always treated with unfriendly and impolite treatment and they have less agency in workplace.

According to a survey conducted by Community Business, workers from LGBT group are feeling discriminated by others by the following aspects: 1.not being respected(80%), 2. oral insulting or mocking(60%). Besides, they are also treated unfairly in the workplace, such as less opportunity to get a promotion(24%), required to resign(15%), and not being hired(13%)

Proposed by Community Business, the Hong Kong LGBT+ Inclusion Index is launched on the LGBT+ workplace inclusion and initiatives in Asia. This is an index which provides a credible and robust tool to assess and promote those companies which has contributed to the LGBT+ inclusion in Hong Kong. Community Business has provided a guide for employer who has already signed up to the index to create inclusive workplaces for LGBT employees in Hong Kong. In the 2019 index, they have published some categories for employers such as equal opportunity policies, diversity structure and corporate culture. The performance of companies which have signed up will be assessed by at least two senior members of the Community Business Team. The index would be a great encouragement for company to fulfill their corporate social responsibility. It will benefit both LGBT minorities having more work opportunities as well as being an opportunity for corporate advertisement. In the 2017 report of the index, most of the highest-scoring employers are multinational financial companies or banks while there are only few local companies. Only one local company, Aids Concern, as a local non-governmental organization, was honored for 2017 LGBT+ Community Impact Award. Most awards are dominant by the international companies, though Hong Kong's local companies and SMEs are increasingly supportive. The city has a crowdsourced LGBTQ Workplace directory, LGBTQ Glassdoor.

=== Business ===
There are visible and invisible pink businesses in Hong Kong.

The visible ones are located mainly in Central, conspicuously in Lan Kwai Fong and SoHo area, such as FLM, LinQ Bar and Fagai as well as Wanchai. Locating in such bustling commercial areas, a "niche enclave" (Yue and Leung, 2017) is formed within the mainstream consumption area. The invisible ones are located in anonymous upstairs areas in Causeway Bay, Mongkok and Tsim Sha Tsui. There are also pop-up stores. They are usually known and operated on insiders' word-of-mouth knowledge.

Lesbian spaces are located mainly in Causeway Bay, Tsim Sha Tsui and Mong Kok. They appear to be safe and comfortable to lesbians with the absence of men, the occurrence of sexual and verbal harassment is therefore reduced.

The invisible pink stores shows queer spaces are still marginalized in the city when facing the sexuality hegemony.

=== Bars and cafés ===
Volume Up, the first LGBT-oriented record label in Hong Kong, was founded by Evan Steer.

== Institutions ==
The Hong Kong Ten Percent Club is an LGBT organisation. It was one of the first ones founded in Hong Kong.

Rainbow of Hong Kong is an LGBT non-profit-making organisation established in 1998 aiming to improve the quality of life of LGBT people by gathering a volunteer team to provide services and organising activities in response to the needs of the LGBT community such as medical services, sex education, domestic counselling and hotline services.

Women Coalition of Hong Kong is an LGBT rights organisation. It was founded around 2002.

Pink Alliance is charitable LGBT organisation promoting the equal rights of LGBT community. Main work of this institution includes carrying out research on history and survey on the LGBT culture and public view towards LGBT, publishing the latest movements and news of equality of LGBT community in both Hong Kong and foreign countries and organising campaigns to support the LGBT community. In 2017, it organised an Asia's Premier LGBT Festival collaborating with other LGBT organisations called 'Pink Season HK' lasted for 5 weeks and held 28 events which gathered 2500 participants. A series of activities and themes included education, music, art, sports and entertainment was held to raise the awareness of the public towards quality of LGBT community and provided an opportunity for the LGBT people to share their stories and support each other. Besides, Pink Alliance organise IDAHOT HK (International Day Against Homophobia & Transphobia) every year collaborating with other LGBT institutions in order to eliminate the discrimination of the public towards LGBT community, build an objective understanding and raise the awareness to support LGBT groups and call for legislation of discrimination towards LGBT groups. During the day, LGBT celebrities and LGBT victims suffered from bullying will share their stories and views on their sexual orientation and support other LGBT participants.

== Education ==
The Hong Kong Government has not implemented any compulsory education syllabus on sexual orientation and LGBT issues. According to the Guidelines on Sex Education in Schools which was published in 1997 and revised in 2004, schools are advised to educate students on different sexualities, homophobia and the normativity of marriage. The decision to introduce these materials, however, is entirely up to the individual school and there are no official restrictions on the materials being used.

Under the International Technical Guidance, Hong Kong carry out the framework of sexuality education for 5-year-old children to students aged 18 or above to promote sexuality education in the curriculum levels. The sexuality education in schools of Hong Kong started from 1971 and kept revising and widening the content inclusive from not only scientific facts and skills on reproduction and marriage and family, but also added the contents of sexuality and gender education. The key concepts of sexuality education in 1997 included 5 aspects: human development, health and behavior, interpersonal relationships, marriage and family ad society and culture. After amended in 2008, the framework also included the part of teaching students to keep an open and caring stance to understand and accept people having different sexuality orientation (LGBT) and learn to think critically towards the view of the mass media on LGBT community and analyse 'sex' or 'gender' related topics rationally and objectively. Moreover, many LGBT-relevant topics are covered under the curriculum of many subjects from primary studies to tertiary studies. For example, in the General Studies of Primary Four to Six syllabus, the framework inculcates a sense of building neutral values and attitudes towards individuals having difference in their growth and development in building their sexual orientation during puberty. In tertiary education, some universities in Hong Kong provides courses on sexuality and gender in the general education curriculum. For example, The Chinese University of Hong Kong and the City University of Hong Kong open elective courses related to sexuality and gender education and some sociology, anthropology and cultural major studies will also provide a neutral view and understanding on sexual orientation and allows students to build an open attitude to accept and call for equality for the LGBT community.

Apart from the curriculum, LGBT students are discriminated in their school life. According to a survey done by the Hong Kong SAR Government, LGBT students received the highest rate of discrimination in secondary schools with 41% out of 3040 respondents indicating that LGBT are "psychologically abnormal". LGBT students pointed out that teachers tend to negatively describe the LGBT issues during the lesson and they would not protect LGBT students who are discriminated by other students. Even some teachers would use the term "abnormal" or "disgusting" to describe the behavior of LGBT people. In addition, the religious background is another crucial factor causing LGBT student being prejudiced. Many local secondary schools have religious background such as Protestant Christianity and Catholicism, in which LGBT culture are prohibited by the school. Some teachers would treat LGBT as a kind of illness or sin that students who are LGBT should be rectified. Thus, students are suffer from the discrimination from the teachers and religious background at school.

The University of Hong Kong has a Queer Straight Alliance.

== Recreation ==
Waiwai Yeo of the WCHK stated that around 2002 the LGBT community did not feel comfortable enough to hold a gay pride parade. The Hong Kong Pride Parade was first held in 2008. Waiwai Yeo stated that 1,000 people participated in the first parade and that it increased to 2,500 in 2011. The Wall Street Journal wrote that this is "a far cry from the millions who flock to the annual pride parades in Brazil and elsewhere." In 2017 10,000 people attended the pride parade. The 2020 parade was cancelled as the Hong Kong Police Force did not allow it.

Pink Dot, another pride event, attracted around 15,000 in 2015.

Les Pêches The Lounge establishes parties for women who are lesbian and bisexual.

The Hong Kong Tourism Board started "Pink Season" to attract LGBT tourism. Dr. Lucetta Kam Yip-lo (金曄路; 金晔路; gam1 jip6 lou6; Jīn Yèlù), who wrote Shanghai Lalas: Female Tongzhi Communities and Politics in Urban China, stated that "LGBT bars or events such as the pride march are a big tourist attraction for lesbians."

The Hong Kong Lesbian & Gay Film Festival is also held. Representations of LGBT Hong Kongers are distorted in music, film, and television to perpetuate social discrimination. It was first established in 1989 and has been held annually. Because of its controversial nature, it had received little government fund but HKLGFF has taken its position in the commercial market and has gained monetary success. It is a society promoting LGBT culture, calling for equality of LGBT community and eliminating the discrimination of LGBT community through cinematic art. In the programme, different LGBT films all over the world will be selected and shown in the cinemas. In the film festival in 2017, the opening film is 120 Beats Per Minute and Kiss Me!(Embrasse-moi!) and the closing film is The Feels and Freak Show.

Queer artists like Leslie Cheung Kwok-wing and Denise Ho are repeatedly attacked by the media, even though their fame has set the precedent for supposedly straight Canto-pop actors and singers Aaron Kwok and Andy Lau, who embrace queer performances like cross-dressing.

In 2022 Hong Kong hosted the Gay Games XI. Carrie Lam stated that she "noted" the news and did not announce congratulations, citing her religion.

Walk In Hong Kong, a popular city walking tour company, has organised an 'LGBT in the City' tour, which introduces tour members to Hong Kong LGBT history, iconic movie filming spots, gay bars, sex toy shops and other notable landmarks.

Choirs

The Hong Kong Gay Men's Chorus (HKGMC) was founded in 2020 for out and proud gay men based in Hong Kong. The Harmonics was also established around 2015 and is among the first LGBTQ plus choirs in Hong Kong.

== Television and films ==
Predominately in the 1990s, there are a handful of mainstream films that challenge the heteronormativity within Hong Kong cinematic productions, and include queer undertones or plot lines within the films. A few well-known examples include Swordsman II, Swordsman III, A Queer Story, Happy Together, He's a Woman, She's a Man and Permanent Residence. Though usually not explicit, critics consider these films unconventional sexuality-wise for the ambiguity. However, films with queerness as the plot centre have been criticized to be simply 'queerscapes' and speculations of all the sexual minorities under the same umbrella term, where people are defined queer as long as they deviate from the gender or sexuality norm.

Television Broadcasts Limited, or TVB for short, is the first and most popular wireless commercial television station in Hong Kong, and having the most viewed TV channels, it has produced a few dozen television series with LGBT characters. According to a content analysis report conducted by Nu Tong Xue She (NTXS), which is also an LGBT awareness organisation, there were 67 television series with LGBT characters over the period of 1976 to 2012, but 70% advocate homophobia using plotlines and 22 of which portray LGBT characters as murderers. For example, LGBT characters are often depicted as mentally-ill, aggressive, and predatory. Overall, there are a few series that portray LGBT characters positively, but they are often side characters, and their stories are not thoroughly explored. Issues such as homophobia and discrimination are often the center of discussion when it comes to queer characters. In the television series A General, a Scholar and a Eunuch released in 2017, homoerotic themes are also used as comic relief only.

A notable television series with LGBT characters, Margaret & David - Green Bean, was released in 2016 and produced by Hong Kong Television Entertainment Company Limited and broadcast on ViuTV. It features a character suspected to be bisexual who is in love with his friend and business partner, but there had not been any explicitly queer plot lines in the series.

Society also sparked debate regarding homosexual content in children's films with the release of 'Beauty and the Beast'. The film includes a scene in which two male characters, LeFou and Stanley, dance together at the final ball before it ends. As the director openly addresses the gay tribute in the film, the debate of appropriacy of homosexual content in children's film sparked off in places including Russia, Malaysia and of course Hong Kong. The president of International Christian Quality Music Secondary and Primary School Chan Wing Sun suggested parents not bring children into cinema for the film due to its gay reference. In response to the controversy, the director of True Light Organization Choi Chi Sum shows support for the film by suggesting parents to bring their children into the theatre and discuss with children on controversial points.

In 2021, Ossan's Love was adapted, and the adaption was aired on ViuTV, becoming the first ever Hong Kong boy's love television series. The television series starred Kenny Wong, Anson Lo and Edan Lui.

== Mass media ==
Mass media in Hong Kong took stance on LGBT related issues. Societal stereotypes of LGBT were made.

The death of Leslie Cheung, a renowned queer celebrity in Hong Kong, in 2003 demonstrated the stances of different mass media in Hong Kong towards LGBT. Cheung claimed to be bisexual and publicly admitted his homosexuality. As written in his suicide note, he committed suicide due to depression. However, the mass media linked his death and depression to his sexual orientation. Newspapers and magazines specifically issued columns on curing depression, preventing suicide and "correction" on sexual disorientation, which represented the belief that homosexuality was deemed incorrect by the public. Some people even declared that homosexuality was an infectious disease like SARS, infecting people with "dangerous ideologies" and "disordered life". Cheung's suicide was portrayed as a violent act of homosexuality. Stereotypes and discrimination against LGBT were obviously shown in media coverage in 2003 in Hong Kong.

In 2012, Denise Ho, a renowned singer in Hong Kong, came out in the fourth annual Hong Kong Pride Parade. No more special columns on correction of sexual disorientation were released in the newspaper after the incident.

News and stories concerning LGBT reported in gossip magazines are sometimes stereotypical while they "normalize" gay/lesbian relationships at times. Gossip magazines report gossip of the people working in the media industry; they are widely circulated in locales like hair salons, clinics and offices. Gossip magazines in Hong Kong have been reporting "secret" gay/lesbian relationships that their reporters have uncovered. It indirectly coerces the celebrities who have not come out prior to their appearance in the reports involved to clarify their sexual orientation and personal relationships in public. The magazines have also linked gay/lesbian relationships with the social and financial statuses of the celebrities involved. With reference to the relationship of So Sze Wang and Gam Yin Leng, a lesbian celebrity couple in Hong Kong, magazine reports tended to focus on the wealthiness of the butch role in a lesbian relationship. Lesbians and bisexual women are also negatively portrayed in the mass media. "Gossip magazine reports can be seen as subversive cultural interventions on the part of queer people working in the media industry." (Tang, 2012)

== Social media ==
The increasing and expanding usage of the Internet has aided LGBT individuals in Hong Kong to engage in interactions and discussions on social media platforms, giving the stigmatised groups a free space to express self-identities. Online communities are shown to play a great part in forming self-confidence and self-acceptance through others' assistance. The internet also serve as a mean to give community support, facilitate wider debates on various topics, and explore sexual and gender identities. Through joining online communities, LGBT members can find methods to cope with outer stigmatisation, discrimination, and lack of emotional support. At the same time, they are able to find the sense of belonging. All these factors constitute social media being an important social capital of LGBT individuals in order to achieve physical and mental well-being, and a mean to cope with societal discrimination and shame. Since the wide-spreading usage of the Internet, a handful of websites for male seeking sexual relations with other males had been set up, including www.gaystation.com.hk, www.radiorepublic.com, which are both deactivated and www.gayhk.com, which is still active.

Phone applications such as "Grindr" and "Jack'd" are also prominent within gay males, who often make use of such applications to find dates. They are the two most downloaded applications for gay males in Hong Kong.

On the other hand, social media also plays a part in organizing social movements and promoting LGBT rights through online platforms. GdotTV, founded in 2008, is the first Chinese LGBT online television station. It has successfully invoked discussions regarding media inclusion and viability of individuals with different sexual orientations, and how to involve them in mainstream media. By producing short films and shows that focus on the life and experience of the LGBT community in Hong Kong, it helps raise awareness of homophobia and discrimination within the wider society. One of the most well-known media projects produced and streamed on GdotTV is the I Am Who I Am Project. By regularly posting videos on different platforms, it aims at raising awareness of the bullying of LGBT students in the school environment, and to spread positive messages to the victims and help them embrace their identities. In addition, public radio RTHK has done interviews, special episodes, and talk shows around LGBTQ content. Increasingly, independent production channels and vloggers on YouTube are also creating LGBTQ-related podcasts and videos.

== Queer pop culture ==
Hong Kong has a queer pop culture for appreciating gay romance, and generally known as ‘Yaoi’. Hong Kong usually adopts its English translation and initialize the phrase "boy love" as ‘bl’. Hong Kong also invent specific phrase in referencing to love between two males in 2013. The phrase ‘hehe’ has been used on the online forum HKGolden literally meaning two ‘he's being together. It later also further develops into ‘sheshe’ for lesbians. The discussion and fantasization of homosexuality has entered popular culture in Hong Kong since then.

Although the queer pop culture might not necessarily be equal to supporting gay equality, Hong Kong records certain cases of the queer pop culture connecting with the LGBT movement. During the 2014 Hong Kong Umbrella Revolution, two student leaders Alex Chow and Lester Shum were made ‘couple’ on several social medias. Fandom appear in appreciating the intimacy of the two leaders, naming them ‘Alexter’ which consists of their names. Facebook community called ‘Lester Alex He He Group’ also gain 30362 followers sharing photos and animation of the two together. This boys’ love community to a point line up with the LGBT movement by joining the 2014 Hong Kong Gay Pride. The rise of this kind of queer pop culture to a certain extent show a rise in public acceptance in homosexuality. According to Jamie J. Zhao, ‘queer pop culture and fandom, facilitated by the wide use of the Internet and digital media, and these relatively improved socio-cultural situations for the survival of LGBTQ people’. In the case of Hong Kong, the ‘hehe’ fandom sometimes provide popular and cultural ways to promote homosexual equality to the public, making a connection between pop culture and social-political impact.

== Entertainment industry ==
Several Hong Kong stars or singers ‘came out’ publicly in supporting the LGBT movement, sparking discussion on homosexuality among stardoms. In 2012, Hong Kong singer Denise Ho, also known as HOCC, ‘came out’ in the Gay Pride Parade, causing changes in her fandom. According to Maud Lavin, ‘the tension between queer and normal has shifted from the heteronormative negotiation of a “proper” female gender and accorded sexuality to the negotiation of a “proper” lesbian embodiment within her fandom’. Her coming-out marks a great step in influencing fandom or even public direction of discussing on homosexual celebrities. Ho also remarked that ‘the public has been really positive about what [she] have done.’. The label of being homosexual is brought into public's interpretation of her music, making homosexuality a topic for casual discussion.

The number of works in relation to LGBT in the music industry also increased with the promotion of lyric-writers. Some famous lyric-writers have been creating songs about homosexuality and use them as media to link homosexuality to the public. For example, Wyman Wong created songs ranging from ‘Rosemary’ to ‘Illuminati’ hinting the transient beauty of love between same gender. In his songs he challenges the binary concept of gender and records the sufferings of LGBT community, making the public recognize problems faced by the community more easily.

== Literature ==
Hong Kong Poet Nicholas Wong in 2016 won the American LGBT Literary Award, Lambda Literary Award, with his poetry Crevasse. He is the first in Hong Kong winning this award. He is named ‘Gay Poet’ after his show up in the award. In his interview, he emphasizes his works are based on view of the queers.

== Notable residents ==
- Raymond Chan Chi-chuen ("Slow beat")
- Gigi Chao
- Leslie Cheung Kwok-wing
- Denise Ho Wan-sze
- Joanne Leung Wing-yan
- Ellen Joyce Loo
- Anthony Wong Yiu-ming
- Yip Pui-yin

== See also ==
- LGBT history in Hong Kong
- LGBT rights in Hong Kong
- Category:Hong Kong LGBTQ-related films
- HIV/AIDS in Hong Kong
