= Joanne Leung =

Hong Kong politician and transgender rights activist

Joanne Leung Wing-yan is the first openly transgender politician in Hong Kong.

Assigned male at birth, Leung underwent sex-reassignment surgery in 2009 to become legally recognized as a woman. She was the chairperson of Pink Alliance until 2017 and is the founder and chairperson of Transgender Resource Center (TGR), two active non-governmental organizations that aim to service the LGBT community and promote LGBT equality. Leung is a transgender lesbian.

== Biography ==
Leung has stated that she first knew she was a woman at the age of six. As a child, she faced bullying and kept her gender struggles to herself. Hiding her transgender identity led to four attempted suicides. In 2004, she consulted a sex clinic to find about sexual reassignment surgery. In 2009, she underwent the operation.

Leung's stated goal is for Hong Kong society to learn more about transsexual and transgender individuals. Passionate about LGBT rights in Hong Kong, Leung strives to ensure other transgender people avoid facing the struggles she herself endured, especially regarding the limited resources on gender identity in Hong Kong. She helped set up the Transgender Resource Centre (TGR), an organisation that supports transgender individuals and provides education about transgender issues. Leung works with TGR on a full-time basis.

In 2014, Leung received her degree in computing from the University of Greenwich. Also in 2014, she spoke to the United Nations Committee on the Elimination of Discrimination against Women (CEDAW), and was the first transgender person from Hong Kong to do so. Leung was openly vocal in her opposition to an amendment to the Marriage Ordinance which would require transgender individuals to have sex reassignment surgery before they could marry. Leung has also been a member of the Advisory Group on Eliminating Discrimination against Sexual Minorities, a group convened by the Hong Kong Special Administrative Region government, and the Community Forum on AIDS. In 2015, Leung joined the Democratic Party in Hong Kong to modernize the party's stance on LGBT issues. She ran in the party primaries of 2016 Hong Kong Legislative election, but was defeated by Lam Cheuk-ting, who subsequently won in the general election. She has been the Policy Committee (LGBT) for The Professional Commons since November 2018.

On 17 May 2019, Leung founded Transgender Resource Center during the IDAHOT event in Hong Kong. After stepping down as chairman the role was given to Henry Tse with Leung staying on as vice-chair. Tse resigned in October 2020 and Leung stepped up again remotely in Taiwan while continuing her master's degree in gender studies.

== Awards ==
- 2021 – Named as one of the "Women of Power 2021" by Prestige Hong Kong Magazine
- 2018 – Prism Award by Hong Kong Lesbian & Gay Film Festival
- 2017 – Nominee for the Secretary's International Women of Courage Award, honoring women who have demonstrated exceptional courage, strength, and leadership in acting to improve others' lives
- 2017 – Woman of Courage Award by the U.S. Consulate Hong Kong and Macau
- 2017 – Listed as one of the 18 Everyday Heros in Mingpao Weekly
- 2016 – Annual LGBT Milestone Award (ALMA)
- 2014 – "She Dare to Change" Award by HER Fund
- 2012 – Named as one of the "45 People Aged 45 or Below Making a Difference in Hong Kong" by Baccarat Magazine in 2012

== Publications ==
Leung, J. W. Y., & Cheung, E. (2025). Heteronormativity and Cisnormativity within the Trans Community in Hong Kong. In P. R. Su, T. Y. Ho, S. Zhang, & Z. Nicolazzo (Eds.), Becoming in Global Trans Studies: Critical Approaches to Educational Theory, Methodology, Ethics, and Politics. New York: Routledge.

梁詠恩（2022）《性/別尋旅——一位跨性別者的自我民族誌》。世新大學性別研究所碩士論文，臺北市。取自：https://hdl.handle.net/11296/rynvp7

梁詠恩（2022）〈唯有愛，才能克服恐懼〉，王道維編《當同志遇見耶穌》，192–210。台灣新北市：真哪噠出版社。

Leung, J. (2015). Joanne: God’s Grace! – A sharing by a Transgender Christian Woman. In God’s Image, 34(2), 25-28. Retrieved from https://www.awrc4ct.org/wp-content/uploads/2021/08/2015_2.pdf

梁詠恩（2015年7月4日）〈跨粉-一個與跨性別有莫大相關，卻被遺忘了的身份〉第五屆中國「性」研究國際研討會，北京：中國人民大學。

梁詠恩（2015）〈香港之跨性別運動前瞻及與社會之相互關係〉，黃慧貞、蔡寶瓊編《性/別政治與本土起義》，300–302。香港：商務印書館。

梁詠恩（2013）〈竭力把自己拗直〉，《我們彎著返教會》，70–87。香港：青森文化。

梁詠恩（2009）〈Joanne的信仰告白〉，《人．性II：誰不是酷兒？本土酷兒神學初探》，29–36。香港：性神學社、香港基督徒學會。

Published by Transgender Resource Center

- 2012 – Gossip Boys and Girls Book 1 – Domestic Transgender Reading Manual
- 2015 – Gossip Boys and Girls Book 2 – A Handbook for Parents of Trans People
- 2016 – Gossip Boys and Girls Book 3 – A Handbook for Trans Ally
- 2017 – Gossip Boys & Girls Book 4：The Book of Transgender in Hong Kong
- 2019 – Gossip Boys & Girls Book 5：TranStory Chinese version (Editing)
- 2019 – Gossip Boys & Girls Book 5：TranStory English version (Editing and Translation)
