= HKCC =

HKCC may refer to:

- A Windows Registry key
- Hong Kong Cricket Club
- Hong Kong Cultural Centre
- Hong Kong Community College
