= Tse Henry Edward v Commissioner of Registration =

2023 Hong Kong Court of Final Appeal case

Tse v Commissioner of Registration
- Judiciary of Hong Kong
- Court: Court of Final Appeal
- Full case name: Tse Henry Edward v Commissioner of Registration
- Decided: 6 February 2023
- Citation: [2023] HKCFA 4; FACV 8/2022

Case history
- Prior action: Q v Commissioner of Registration (HCAL 229/2015)
- Subsequent action: Subsequent judicial review filed by the appellant regarding the new policy (HCAL 1004/2025)

Court membership
- Judges sitting: Chief Justice Andrew Cheung; Permanent Judges Roberto Ribeiro, Joseph Fok, and Johnson Lam; Non-Permanent Judge Lord Sumption

Tse Henry Edward v Commissioner of Registration, alongside the conjoined case Q v Commissioner of Registration, is a case heard by the Court of Final Appeal of Hong Kong. The Court ruled that the Hong Kong government's policy requiring transgender individuals to undergo full sex reassignment surgery in order to change the gender marker on their identity cards violated the right to privacy protected under Article 14 of the Hong Kong Bill of Rights Ordinance.

== Background ==
The plaintiff, Tse Henry Edward, is a transgender man (assigned female at birth) whose British passport lists his legal gender as male. Tse has identified as male since childhood and has undergone psychotherapy, hormonal treatment, a mastectomy, and real-life experience. Medically, it was fully established that Tse required no further surgical procedures to integrate into society. Over the years, Tse had experienced numerous inconveniences due to the gender marker on his identity document, such as being rejected when applying for youth hostels and facing suspicion of identity fraud when withdrawing money at banks, prompting him to seek a legal gender change.

Hong Kong residents are required to carry a Hong Kong Identity Card (HKID), which contains personal data including the holder's name and a gender marker. While the gender marker is a primary piece of information for verifying the holder's identity, it does not legally define the holder's gender for all legal purposes. The Commissioner of Registration had previously enforced a policy requiring transgender individuals to undergo full sex reassignment surgery as a prerequisite for amending the gender marker on their HKID. The appellant filed an application for judicial review against this policy, arguing that the requirement violated the right to privacy under Article 14 of the Hong Kong Bill of Rights (BOR14). BOR14 is equivalent in scope to Article 8 of the European Convention on Human Rights.

The plaintiff, along with two other individuals, first applied for judicial review in 2017 but had their cases dismissed by both the Court of First Instance and the Court of Appeal.

== Court of Final Appeal Judgment ==
The five judges of the Court of Final Appeal unanimously allowed the appeal, overturning the decisions of the lower courts. The written judgment was jointly handed down by Permanent Judges Roberto Ribeiro and Joseph Fok.

The Court held that the Immigration Department's policy engaged values intimately connected to personal factors, and therefore the proportionality test should be applied. The applicable standard of review was whether the policy was "no more than reasonably necessary". The Court concluded that the policy dictating how gender amendment applications were accepted failed to satisfy this test, rejecting the Immigration Department's refusal of the appellant's gender change on three main grounds:

- Firstly, the Court rejected the Immigration Department's argument that undergoing full sex reassignment surgery was the only workable and objective standard to prove a person's gender. Citing examples from other jurisdictions, the Court pointed out that legal gender recognition procedures in other regions do not necessitate such arduous requirements.
- Secondly, the Court dismissed the argument that the policy was necessary to prevent administrative issues arising from physical incongruence between a transgender person's appearance and their gender marker. It noted that the majority of administrative confusion stems from a person's outward appearance rather than their genital anatomy.
- Thirdly, the Court reasoned that the likelihood of a transgender man reversing his transition and subsequently becoming pregnant was highly remote, and therefore did not constitute a rational justification for demanding full surgical intervention.

The policy was found to be disproportionate and unconstitutional. In its concluding remarks, the Court observed that the policy failed to strike a reasonable balance between safeguarding the rights of transgender individuals and the interests of society. Consequently, the Court declared the Commissioner of Registration's refusal to amend the appellant's gender marker void and ruled that the blanket policy requiring full sex reassignment surgery prior to gender marker amendment was unconstitutional.

== Policy Changes ==
On 3 April 2024, in compliance with the judgment in the Tse case, the government revised its policy regarding the "Amendment of Gender on Hong Kong Identity Card".

The updated policy framework is as follows:

1. Individuals who have completed full sex reassignment surgery may continue to amend their gender marker under the previous policy framework without being affected by the new changes.
2. Individuals who have not completed full sex reassignment surgery must satisfy multiple criteria to amend the gender marker on their HKID.

For individuals in the second category, the Immigration Department requires the following:

- Completion of surgical procedures to alter sexual characteristics:
  1. Female to Male: Removal of the breasts (bilateral mastectomy).
  2. Male to Female: Removal of the penis and testes.
- Satisfying the Commissioner of Registration that the applicant has met all the following conditions, supported by a statutory declaration in a specified format confirming that the applicant:
  1. Has or has had gender dysphoria;
  2. Has lived consistently in the acquired gender for at least two years immediately preceding the application date;
  3. Intends to continue living in the acquired gender for the remainder of their life;
  4. Has continuously received cross-sex hormone treatment for at least two years immediately preceding the application date; and
  5. Will continue to receive ongoing cross-sex hormone treatment and will submit relevant blood test reports for hormone level random checks as required by the Commissioner.
- If an applicant is unable to meet the above medical requirements, they must provide medical justifications, relevant medical certificates, and other supporting documents, which the Immigration Department will consider on a case-by-case basis.
- Any change in residential address or contact telephone number must be reported to the Commissioner of Registration within 30 days of the change.

== Subsequent Controversies ==
The fact that the Immigration Department took over a year to update its gender amendment policy following the court ruling was criticized by Tse, who accused the government of intentional delay and subsequently applied for another judicial review.

Following the announcement of the new policy, Tse filed a second judicial review on 25 April 2025. He argued that the requirement to submit lifetime medical reports and hormone level data infringes upon his right to privacy. He further contended that the mandate to notify the Immigration Department of any change in residential address or contact information violates the Basic Law.

As of 31 August 2025, no hearing date has been scheduled for this judicial review (Case Number: HCAL 1004/2025).

== See also ==
- LGBT rights in Hong Kong
