= Hong Kong Pride Parade =

Annual LGBT event in Hong Kong

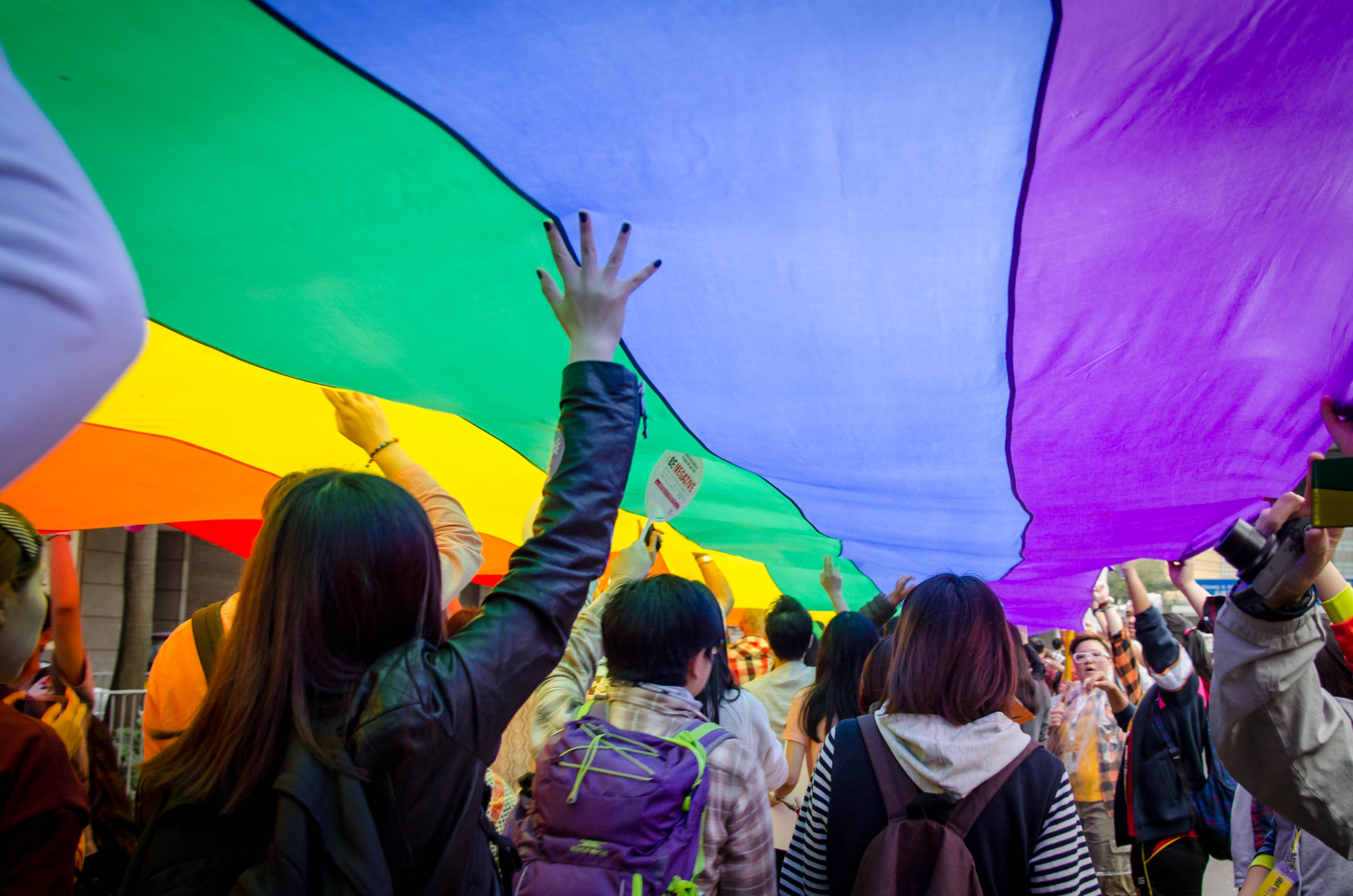
- Hong Kong Pride parade 2014
- Traditional Chinese: 香港同志遊行
- Simplified Chinese: 香港同志游行
- Hanyu Pinyin: Xiānggǎng Tóngzhì Yóuxíng
- Yale Romanization: Hēunggóng tùhngji yàuhhàhng
- Jyutping: Heong^{1}gong^{2} tung^{4}zi^{3} yau^{4}hang^{4}

The Hong Kong Pride Parade (Chinese: 香港同志遊行) is an annual march in Hong Kong in support of LGBT rights. Homosexuality has been legal in Hong Kong since 1991 but there is no legal recognition of any same-sex relationships and limited protection against discrimination.

For the past several years the march has begun in Victoria Park and ended in Tamar Park or, in the most recent parade, at Edinburgh Place in front of City Hall.

== History ==
=== Formal organised parades ===
There are four main organisations that coordinate the parade: Women Coalition of HKSAR, Rainbow of Hong Kong, Nu Tong Xue She, and Gay Harmony.

=== 2008 ===
The first formal Pride Parade in Hong Kong was held on 13 December 2008. The route was from Great George Street Pedestrianised Area in Causeway Bay to the Southorn Playground in Wan Chai.

=== 2009 ===
The second parade was held on 1 November 2009, the route was from the ending of the last year’s parade—Southorn Playground in Wan Chai to Chater Garden in Central.

=== 2010 ===
For financial reasons the Pride Parade did not take place in 2010.

=== 2011 ===
The third parade was held on 12 November 2011, the route was from East Point Road to the Southorn Playground.

=== 2012 ===
The fourth parade was held on 10 November 2012, the route was from Victoria Park in Causeway Bay to the Chater Garden in Central. The parade was held after the veto of Cyd Ho's bill in the Legislative Council, which asked the HKSAR government to produce proposals and hope consultations to expand the protection against discrimination to LGBT people in Hong Kong. Some anti-LGBT organisations, such as the Christian Right group The Society For Truth And Light, collected thousands of signatures to oppose the consultation.

=== 2013 ===
The fifth pride parade was held on 9 November 2013. Approximately 5,200 people marched from Victoria Park to the Central Government Complex. During the event the pro-Beijing Liberal Party approached people and urged them to sign a petition in opposition of same-sex marriage.

=== 2014 ===
On 8 November 2014 marchers walked in the rain from Victoria Park to Tamar Park in front of the Central Government Complex. Organisers estimated that 8,900 took part, and stated that the boost in numbers could be partly attributed to Umbrella Movement participants as well as increased corporate sponsorship, including the MTR Corporation having offered the parade in-station advertising at a discounted rate. Dr. York Chow, chairman of the Equal Opportunities Commission, joined the parade for a second year in spite of criticism from anti-gay groups.

=== 2015 ===
The seventh parade was held on 8 November 2015. About 9,000 participants marched from Victoria Park to Tamar Park at the Central Government Complex. This is the largest parade since 2008.

=== 2016 ===
The eighth parade was held on 26 November 2016. The march started at Victoria Park and ended at Edinburgh Place in Central. In spite of cold weather and heavy rain, about 6,800 took part in the parade, including top diplomats in Hong Kong and various legislators including Leung Kwok-hung (Long Hair), Alvin Yeung, and Raymond Chan. The theme of the parade was the "green light", symbolising the fight to switch on the green light for equality. The new chairman of the Equal Opportunities Commission, Alfred Chan Cheung-ming, urged the government to move forward with anti-discrimination legislation to cover sexual orientation and gender identity. The parade organisers criticised the absence of progress on this front during the current administration's tenure, and pointed out that Hong Kong society (including 90 per cent of Hong Kong youth) support the enactment of such laws.

=== 2017 ===
The ninth annual pride parade was held on 25 November 2017. Blue was the colour theme for the event, chosen from the sky and ocean to symbolise freedom and equality. Up to 10,000 marchers participated in the march from Victoria Park in Causeway Bay to Edinburgh Place in Central, outside City Hall. Attendees included more than a dozen top diplomats, several Legislative Council members and chairman of the Equal Opportunities Commission, Alfred Chan Cheung-ming. Nathan Law also attended the parade whilst on bail following his imprisonment stemming from the Umbrella Movement. Chief Executive Carrie Lam and Secretary for Constitutional and Mainland Affairs Patrick Nip refused invitations to attend.

=== 2018 ===
The tenth annual pride parade was held on 17 November 2018. Purple was the colour theme for the event. Up to 12,000 marchers participated in the march from Victoria Park in Causeway Bay to Edinburgh Place in Central, outside City Hall. Attendees included more than a dozen top diplomats, several Legislative Council members and chairman of the Equal Opportunities Commission, Alfred Chan Cheung-ming. Chief Executive Carrie Lam and Secretary for Constitutional and Mainland Affairs Patrick Nip refused invitations to attend. The police also arrested a participant in the parade for being naked with criminal charge of outraging public decency, the participant was found guilty of the charge and sentenced to a fine of 900 Hong Kong Dollars.

=== 2019 ===
The eleventh annual pride parade was held on 16 November 2019. Unlike previous years, the parade was held in the form of a rally instead of a march like previous years, due to the police rejecting the organiser's application for a march due to public safety concerns associated with the 2019–20 Hong Kong protests. The event was held at Edinburgh Place in Central. Organisers estimated a turnout of 6,500 people, halved from previous years, while police estimated 850.

=== 2020 (virtual) ===
The physical 2020 parade was cancelled by the Hong Kong Police Force due to COVID-19 restrictions. A virtual one was held in its place.

=== 2021 ===
In 2021 a rainbow market event was held on November the 13th, with the theme of "Stay in Love". The market space featured businesses supportive of the LGBT+ community, booths by sponsors, community groups, and photo ops for attendees. The market was held, rather than a march, due to coronavirus restrictions. Attendees were temperature checked before entering the market space.

=== 2022 ===
In 2022 the event was again held as a market over the 12th and 13th of November.

=== 2023 ===
The parade did not return in 2023, instead the committee organised an exhibition and a guided tour through Kwun Tong themed around "A Journey with Rainbow GPS".

Spokeswomen for the committee explained that they wouldn't be holding a march due to safety concerns for the participants. They noted that new restrictions, were one of the factors, as the committee didn't want to set up rules and restrictions on participants.

Some of the concerns may be linked to the 2020 Hong Kong national security law putting stronger restrictions on how marches and protests are held.

== Description ==
Every year’s pride parade has a theme and clothing suggestions, emphasizing different concerns and desired rights of the LGBT community. The theme of Pride Parade 2012 was ‘Dare to love’ and the dress code was different professional outfits which stressed equality of LGBT people in the workplace.

In Pride Parade 2012, many celebrities participated in the campaign, including singers Denise Ho and Anthony Wong, and politicians Cyd Ho and Ray Chan. They led 4,000 people in the celebration. Denise Ho officially came out at the parade. She said "As a celebrity, I think I have an obligation, a duty to stand forward for the sake of love and equality."

== Trend ==
=== Number of participants ===
The first Pride Parade in Hong Kong was held in 2008. Roughly 1,000 people participated or attended. The next year, the number decreased to 800 people. There was no Pride Parade held in 2010 due to a lack of funds. In 2011, the parade restarted and 2,500 people participated in the parade. In 2012, the number of participants increased to 4,000.

=== Social atmosphere ===
The scale of pride parade becomes bigger. And the ticket sold in 2011 was 75%. The festival director, Karl Uhrich, believed that the sales of tickets would be better in 2012 due to the increasing tolerance of the gay and lesbian community.

== Impact ==
The yearly Hong Kong Pride Parades brought increasing numbers of LGBT individuals out of their closets. The event’s official website claimed that the number of participants nearly doubled in 2012 than that of 2011. Its organizer, Connie Chan Man-wai in 2012 said that Hong Kong is the only city in China open for gay pride parades, and each year there are one-third of the parade participants being Mainlanders.

Additionally, it raised awareness and mass support for LGBT rights. Chan also revealed that corporate sponsors and university students were eager to join for the first time since the beginning of these parades.

== Criticism ==
In June 2011, Hong Kong Government hired a psychiatrist to train government counsellors and claimed that homosexuality can be "cured", which outraged the gay right activists.

In June 2012, Hong Kong evangelist Pastor Enoch Lam held a religious seminar on "The Christian View on Homosexuality" in response of the gay right activities. In the seminar, he compared drug and gambling addiction to homosexuality and said: "[So] homosexuals, drug addicts, God still loves them all. However, I want to tell them that their behaviors, God will not agree and they must correct [themselves]." These statements drew huge criticism from society, including from some Liberal Christians, being described as discriminatory to LGBT people.

In October 2018, conservative groups initiated a petition to demand banning of the parade, criticizing it for having had indecent performances in the past.

== See also ==
- LGBT culture in Hong Kong
- LGBT history in Hong Kong
