= HIV/AIDS in Hong Kong =

HIV/AIDS in Hong Kong was first reported in 1984. As of the end of 2021, 11,232 people have been diagnosed with HIV in Hong Kong. New diagnoses are highest in gay and bisexual men, with 53.5% of new diagnoses occurring in men who have sex with men. The rate of reported transmissions peaked in 2015, and has since decreased by 49.1%.

== Demographics ==
The Department of Health has recorded a cumulative total of 11,232 cases of HIV infection and 2,320 cases of AIDS. The number of new diagnoses peaked in 2015 at 725 new cases, and has fallen to 447 cases in 2021.

A majority of the HIV reports are male (82%) and Chinese (71%). Most (71%) infected people were diagnosed at an age between 20 and 49.

Sexual contact contributed to 81% of reported HIV cases. Intravenous drug users comprised 0.7% of cases, and there were no reported cases of perinatal or blood transmission.

Men who have sex with men (MSM) cases comprised 53.5% of all reported cases. In 2021, there were 239 recorded cases, representing a 49.1% decrease from the peak in 2015 of 470 cases.

== Public health policy ==
The Department of Health provides a free HIV testing service through the AIDS Hotline and the Gay Men HIV Testing Hotline. HIV treatment is available for free through public health clinics.

Pre-exposure prophylaxis (PrEP) is not offered by the public health service. Private medication costs HK$6,000 per month.

The Hong Kong Advisory Council on AIDS (ACA) is a permanent non-statutory body that advises the government on HIV/AIDS public health policy. In its 2022–27 strategy, the ACA identified six priority populations: MSM, HIV patients, ethnic minorities, transgender people, people who inject drugs, and female sex workers and their male clients. The ACA identified eight strategic areas, including increasing access to HIV prevention tools, targeted interventions for priority populations, enhancing youth sexual education, and reducing HIV-related stigma and discrimination.

== Legal rights ==
There are no statutes explicitly criminalising HIV transmission or exposure in Hong Kong, and there have been no reported cases of HIV criminalisation. However, intentional or reckless transmission may constitute a criminal offence of inflicting grievous bodily harm contrary to section 17 (intentional) or section 19 (intentional or reckless) of the Offences Against the Person Ordinance (Cap. 212). The section 17 offence carries a maximum penalty of life imprisonment, and the section 19 offence carries a maximum penalty of 3 years' imprisonment.

=== Discrimination ===
Direct and indirect discrimination based on a person's HIV status is unlawful under the Disability Discrimination Ordinance (Cap. 487). Direct discrimination occurs when a person with HIV is treated less favourably than another person without HIV in similar circumstances. Indirect discrimination occurs when a condition is applied to everyone, but in practice affects persons with HIV more adversely, and the condition cannot be justified. Harassment, vilification, and victimisation are also unlawful.

=== Privacy ===
Article 14 of the Bill of Rights states that "no person shall be subjected to arbitrary or unlawful interference with [their] privacy and that everyone has the right to the protection of the law against such interference". At common law and under the Code of Professional Conduct of the Medical Council of Hong Kong, a doctor generally must not disclose information about patients obtained in the course of professional duties.

== Public awareness and stigma ==
A 2021 study involving college students in Hong Kong concluded that there was a "moderate" level of HIV awareness among respondents who were asked a series of questions on HIV-related knowledge. The study found that certain misconceptions about HIV transmission still exist, including 60% who failed to recognise that anal sex is the primary route of HIV transmission and 50% who believed that HIV could be transmitted via insects or sharing a toothbrush. According to the study, the results suggest that there have been no significant improvements in awareness over the preceding two decades.

The same study found that among the college student participants, most reported "an accepting, instead of stigmatizing, attitude toward people with HIV". Over 60% of participants agreed with statements such as "I am willing to accept people with HIV and be their friend" and "I am willing to do sports/shake hands with people with HIV". Fewer (29.7%) participants agreed with statements indicating stigma, with only 11.2% agreeing that "I think that taking an HIV test is disgraceful" and 15.4% agreeing that "I think AIDS is a punishment from god".

== See also ==
- HIV/AIDS in China
- HIV/AIDS in Asia
- HIV/AIDS global epidemic
- LGBT rights in Hong Kong
- LGBT culture in Hong Kong
- Human rights in Hong Kong
