= Transgender Resource Center =

LGBTQ organisations based in Hong Kong

The Transgender Resource Center (Traditional Chinese: 跨性別資源中心) was started in 2008 by Joanne Leung Wing-yan, a transgender woman from Hong Kong. The Hong Kong–based organization provides information on and to transgender people in Hong Kong and mainland China. It also advocates for legal reforms to protect the transgender community.

When it initially opened, TGR only provided social spaces and counseling services for transgender Hong Kongers. Currently, the organization also disseminates information to members of the transgender community. TGR's founder and chairperson, Leung, has called for legislation that allows transgender individuals to have their gender recognized and for greater social acceptance of transgender people in Hong Kong and mainland China. Finally, the organization advocates for an anti-discrimination ordinance that would protect LGBT people from discrimination.

TGR argues that the Hong Kong government needs a gender recognition ordinance because transgender individuals in Hong Kong may have their gender legally changed if they have undergone sex reassignment surgery. TGR has lobbied for legislation that would allow transgender individuals to change their gender without surgery. Such proposed legislation has faced opposition from Christian groups in Hong Kong.

TGR has written and published a series of transgender manuals called "Gossip Boys and Girls" (in Chinese named as 是非男女). One of the most recently version in English is "The Book of Transgender in Hong Kong".

After ten years of being without a permanent location, TGR opened a center in Hung Hom on 31 December 2017.

TGR has also worked with the Equal Opportunities Commission of Hong Kong to draft a report on transgender people's interactions with law enforcement.
