= Henry Tse =

Hong Kong transgender rights activist

Henry Edward Tse
- Born: 1990 or 1991 (age 35–36); Hong Kong
- Education: University of Warwick
- Occupation: Activist
- Organization: Transgender Equality Hong Kong

Henry Edward Tse (born 1990/91) is a transgender rights activist based in Hong Kong. He is the founder of Transgender Equality Hong Kong. In February 2023, Tse won a court appeal to remove full sex reassignment surgery as a requirement for changing gender on identification cards.

== Early life and education ==
Tse was born in Hong Kong and assigned female at birth. He experienced gender dysphoria from early childhood, which worsened when he attended a religious secondary school for girls. He moved to the United Kingdom to attend the University of Warwick, and began his gender transition in 2012, undergoing hormone treatment and top surgery.

== Career and activism ==
In the United Kingdom, Tse changed his gender to male on his British passport, got a Gender Recognition Certificate, and lived and worked as a man without difficulties. After returning to Hong Kong, in 2017 he applied to update the gender marker on his ID card, but was rejected, as he had not undergone genital surgery. City law required full sex reassignment surgery to change the gender marker on one's ID card.

Tse and two other trans men filed for judicial review, arguing that the surgery requirements violated constitutional and privacy rights. Their case was heard in 2018, but dismissed the following year. Tse and other activists continued to appeal, ultimately appearing before the Hong Kong Court of Final Appeal in January 2023.

In February 2023, the Court of Final Appeal ruled in the activists' favor, stating that the government's surgery requirements were unconstitutional and unacceptably burdensome. The ruling was not immediately implemented.

In April 2024, after Hong Kong removed the requirement for full gender-affirming surgery, Tse received a new identity card reflecting his gender change.

== Awards and recognition ==
In May 2023, Time magazine named Tse as a "Next Generation Leader".

== See also ==
- LGBT rights in Hong Kong
