= Rainbow of Hong Kong =

LGBT rights organisation in Hong Kong

- Formation: 1 December 1991; 34 years ago
- Type: Charitable non-profit
- Purpose: Promoting LGBT rights in Hong Kong
- Headquarters: Hong Kong
- Key people: Jimmy Sham, Raymond Lai, Tian Feng, Tommy Tsai
- Website: www.rainbowhk.org

Rainbow of Hong Kong (Chinese: 香港彩虹; Jyutping: Hoeng1gong2 Coi2hung4) is a non-profit organisation advocating for LGBT rights in Hong Kong. It was founded on 1 December 1991 and registered as a charity in 2011.

== History ==
Rainbow of Hong Kong was originally based in Mong Kok, but after one year of operation it moved its headquarters due to financial problems. Until 2007, the organisation received funding from the AIDS Trust Fund Council in the suburb of Jordan, with much of the money going towards the development of Hong Kong's first social services centre for members of the LGBT community, which opened on 30 July 2007. The centre provides counselling, volunteer training, and LGBT awareness classes.
