= Equal Opportunities Commission (Hong Kong) =

Hong Kong statutory body

- 平等機會委員會
- Abbreviation: EOC
- Formation: 20 May 1996; 30 years ago
- Type: Statutory body
- Legal status: Active
- Headquarters: 16/F, 41 Heung Yip Road, Wong Chuk Hang
- Location: Hong Kong
- Services: Investigation, advocacy, advisory
- Fields: Human rights
- Chairperson: Linda Lam
- Board of directors: Eliza Chan; Queenie Chan; Rosanna Cho; Lily Chow; Theresa Cunanan; James Fong; Aruna Gurung; Peter Douglas Koon; Simon Lam; Lui Wai-cheung; Vishal Melwani; Shirley To; Linda Tsang; Vincent Wong; Symon Wong; Kitty Wu
- Expenses: HK$143,873,773 (2024–25)
- Website: Official website

Equal Opportunities Commission
- Traditional Chinese: 平等機會委員會
Transcriptions
Yue: Cantonese
- Yale Romanization: Pìhng dáng gēi wuih wái yùhn wuih
- Jyutping: Ping^{4} dang^{2} gei^{1} wui^{6} wai^{2} jyun^{4} wui^{6*2}

The Equal Opportunities Commission (EOC) is a public body in Hong Kong that investigates discrimination complaints and promotes equality. It was created in 1996 as the city's first semi-governmental agency focused on sex discrimination. Its scope has since been expanded to include protecting groups based on race, disability, and family status. The commission was founded after Legislative Councillor Anna Wu tabled the Equal Opportunities Bill in 1994.

== History ==
=== Background ===
In the early 1990s, women in Hong Kong were not protected against sex discrimination or sexual harassment, because courts could not directly enforce human rights convention that included the right to equality. The median wage of women in 1994 was about a third lower than that of men, and classified advertisements often limited senior positions in the private sector to men and low-paying jobs only sought female applicants.

The Hong Kong government has had a history of opposing anti-discrimination legislation. When the United Kingdom ratified the Convention on the Elimination of All Forms of Discrimination Against Women (CEDAW) in 1986, the treaty also applied to other British Dependent Territories. However, the Hong Kong government requested that CEDAW to not be applied to the city until it could assess its effect. It said that ratifying CEDAW might cause "significant economic and social consequences", and specifically, that CEDAW and anti-discrimination laws would harm Hong Kong's laissez-faire market and traditional Chinese customs that treat men and women differently.

In the 1990s, the Hong Kong government was increasingly pressured to address equality and human rights. During the 1991 legislative election, which produced Hong Kong's first directly elected lawmakers, women's groups pressed candidates into acknowledging discrimination against women. As a result, the 1991 Legislative Council asserted more pressure on the executive than its predecessors. In November 1991, Legislative Councillor Emily Lau helped form an ad hoc group in the legislature to study women's issues. In March 1992, an inter-departmental working group on sex discrimination was created to advise the government on whether to extend CEDAW to Hong Kong. On 16 December 1992, Lau introduced a bill that urged the Hong Kong government to support the application of CEDAW. The government opposed the bill, but it was nonetheless passed after all but the three ex-officio members voted in its favour.

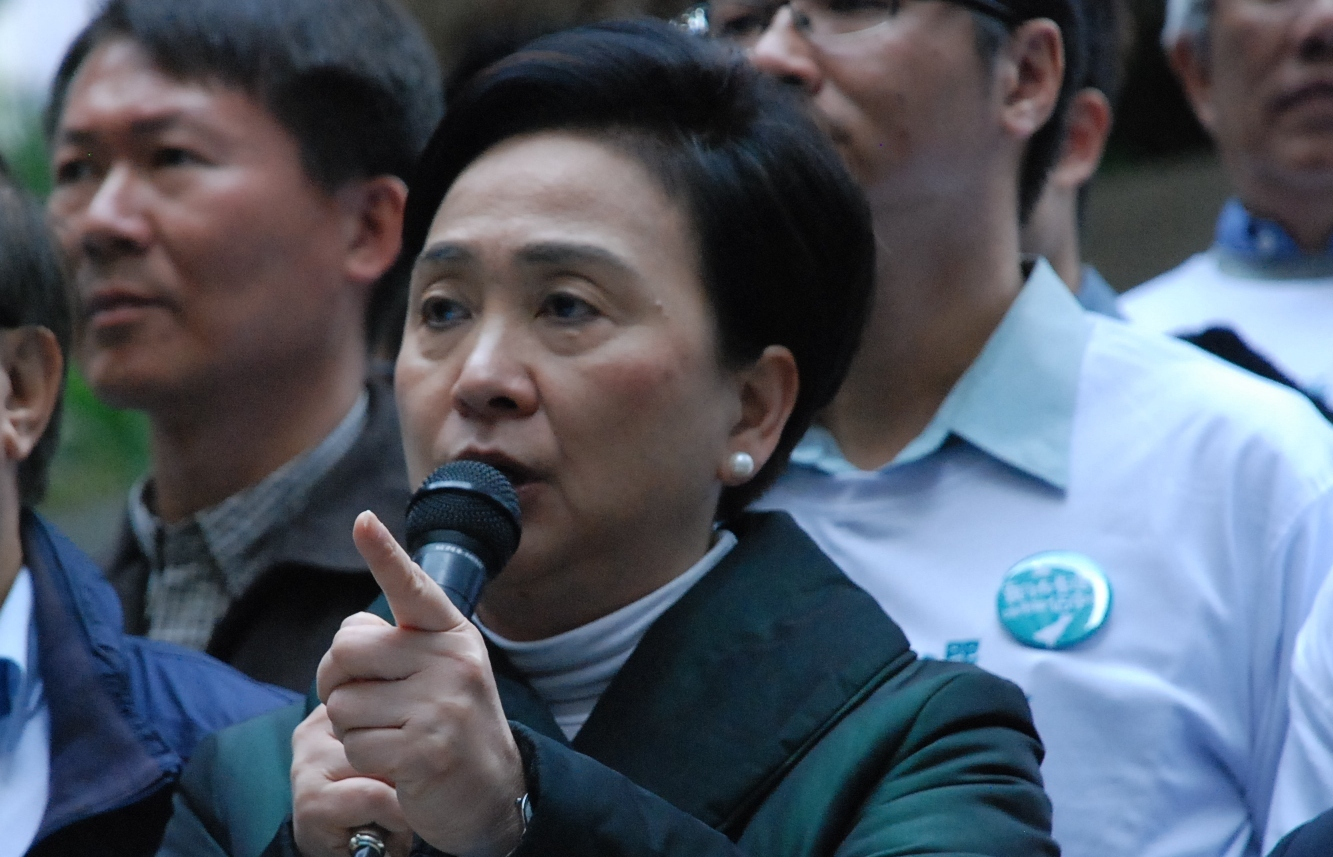
Emily Lau at a demonstration in 2014.

The Hong Kong government did not act on the bill immediately and maintained that the public must be consulted first. After nine months of preparation, it issued the Green Paper on Equal Opportunities for Women and Men in August 1993. Legal scholar Carole Petersen said the government had understated discrimination against women in the green paper. By the end of the public consultation, Secretary for Home Affairs Michael Suen said that "[it] would be difficult for [the government] to come up with credible arguments not to extend CEDAW".

=== Founding ===
Anna Wu, an appointed Legislative Councillor, tabled the Equal Opportunities Bill in 1994. She believed that tabling the bill three years before the handover of Hong Kong was a window of opportunity to expand equality rights. The bill sought to outlaw discrimination on grounds including sex, marital status, pregnancy, sexuality, race, age, disability, and political and religious conviction. If passed, it would also prohibit employers from placing advertisements that specify the sex and age of jobseekers. As a private member's bill that did not affect government revenue, the Equal Opportunities Bill was tabled without government consent.

Wu also put forth the Human Rights and Equal Opportunities Commission Bill, which would create a statutory body for equality and a tribunal to adjudicate claims under the Equal Opportunities Bill. The Equal Opportunities Tribunal could cost 800 million Hong Kong dollars to set up.

The proposed equality institutions were also opposed by China. Legal scholar Wu Jianfan of Peking University and Hong Kong pro-Beijing politician Raymond Wu said the bill would violate the Basic Law, which was to become Hong Kong's mini-constitution after the city's sovereignty is transferred to China in 1997. Wu Jianfan said the tribunal was not mentioned in the Basic Law and therefore could not exist in Hong Kong under Chinese rule.

The Hong Kong government rejected the bills in June 1994 and instead tabled two other bills with a narrower scope that separately banned sex and disability discrimination. The bill on sex discrimination also sought to set up an equal opportunities commission instead of the independent human rights commission Anna Wu had proposed. Wu and equality groups criticised the decision, saying that an equal opportunities commission, unlike a human rights commission, could only monitor and settle discrimination complaints and lacked the legal power to prosecute people who violated anti-discrimination laws.

Despite government opposition, Wu's Equal Opportunities Bill proceeded to different stages at the Legislative Council. Public hearings on the bill were held in 1995. In April 1995, Wu decided to break the bill into three, each addressing different areas of discrimination to ensure that some parts of it could pass before the legislative session ended.

On the other hand, the government on 27 May 1995 pushed to resume second reading of its Sex Discrimination Bill against the wishes of the bills committee and before amendments were finalised. The Sex Discrimination Bill was passed at 1:25 am on 29 June 1995 after a nine-hour debate, during which the government and pro-business legislators stopped attempts by liberal lawmakers to expand the bill's scope by removing the Small House Policy exemption and shortening the grace period for small businesses.

The EOC was established on 20 May 1996 with Fanny M. Cheung as its first chairperson, after candidates such as Elsie Leung turned down the offer that included a salary of $157,250 and a monthly cash bonus of $70,320.

=== Early history ===
The EOC brought its first sex discrimination case to court in 1997. It sued Apple Daily, which placed an advertisement for "pretty female reporters" to report on balls and social events. The District Court judge ruled in favour of Apple Daily because the language used in the advertisement in the newspaper's celebrity section was vague and therefore did not violate the Sex Discrimination Ordinance. The Court of Appeal overturned the decision, saying that allowing the ambiguous language would permit employers to advertise freely for only one gender. The court did not impose penalties, and the EOC said it was more important to clarify the law than to punish the newspaper.

On 1 August 1999, Cheung was replaced as chairperson by Anna Wu, who had been a member of the commission since its founding.

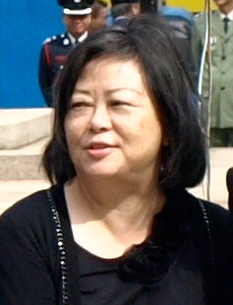
Anna Wu became the second chairperson of the EOC in 1999.

=== Later years ===
Michael Wong, a retired judge, replaced Wu on 1 August 2003. Supporters of Wu said her contract was not renewed because she had criticised the government as the EOC chairperson.

During his three-month tenure, Wong dismissed Patrick Yu before he took up the post as the commission's director of operations because Yu had written in the South China Morning Post that Hong Kong should enact a race discrimination law. Wong had said that making those comments were inappropriate. Before being appointed to the post by Anna Wu, Yu was the executive director of the Northern Ireland Council for Ethnic Minorities.

Sixty civil and human rights NGOs asked Wong to resign because of Yu's dismissal and allegations that Wong had accepted free air tickets as a judge. Wong resigned on 6 November, saying that the media was unfairly criticising him and his family and that the government was unsupportive during the scandal.

The Independent Commission Against Corruption later investigated Wong on suspicion of bribery after complaints were filed that he had used false documents to apply for government reimbursement of air tickets valued at HK$171,666 for him and his family. The prosecutor later dropped charges against Wong due to insufficient evidence.

The government appointed Patricia Chu, a former deputy director of the Social Welfare Department, one month after Wong resigned. Chu was given the position as a "transitional measure" with a one-year term, two years less than her predecessors. Legislators, academics and activists have criticised the government for appointing a former civil servant because it would harm the EOC's perceived independence. Chu left the post after a year as chairperson on 15 December 2004. The government said she declined to renew her contract for personal reasons. The South China Morning Post reported that renewal negotiations had collapsed after the government offered only a six-month contract when Chu requested another one-year term.

Raymond Tang began his five-year tenure as chairperson a month after Chu's departure.

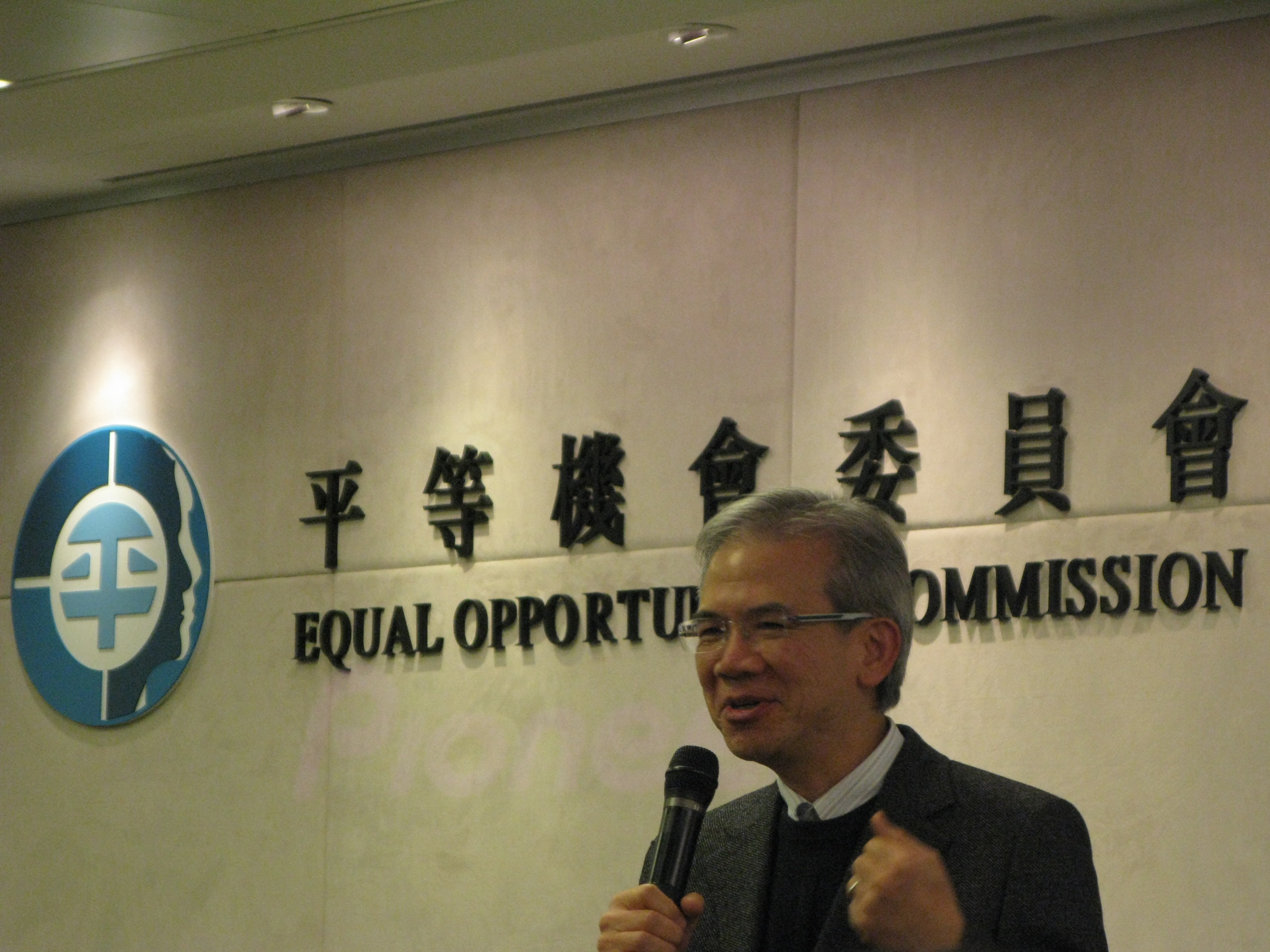
Lam Woon-kwong speaking at an EOC event

Tang was succeeded by Lam Woon-kwong on 1 February 2010.

Former health secretary York Chow became the EOC chairperson on 1 April 2013. Human rights activists initially questioned whether Chow would criticise the government as a long-time civil servant and the former health secretary. They also said he avoided saying if he supported a law to prohibit discrimination on grounds of sexual orientation. After becoming the chairperson, Chow reversed his position and supported such a legislation. Under Chow, the EOC explored changing the Sex Discrimination Ordinance to recognise common-law marriages and amending the Family Status Discrimination Ordinance to over "family responsibility". By the end of his tenure, he was seen to have made queer culture more visible in Hong Kong.

The Hong Kong government began to recruit for the chairperson in September 2015 but did not inform Chow. Chow applied for the position to renew his term but he was eliminated in the first round of selection. Alfred Chan replaced Chow as chairperson on 11 April 2016. Less than two months after Chan's appointment, some legislators raised concerns over Chan's comments that a law to protect sexual minorities from discrimination and his conflation of gender identity and sexual orientation. Women groups also called for Chan to resign after he said women were not concerned about equal pay and were drawn to elderly care because they were more attentive than men. The EOC said Chan's remarks intended to highlight inequality but he did not communicate the point clearly.

Ricky Chu became the EOC's eighth chairperson on 11 April 2019.

Linda Lam became the EOC's ninth chairperson on 11 April 2024.

== Powers and functions ==
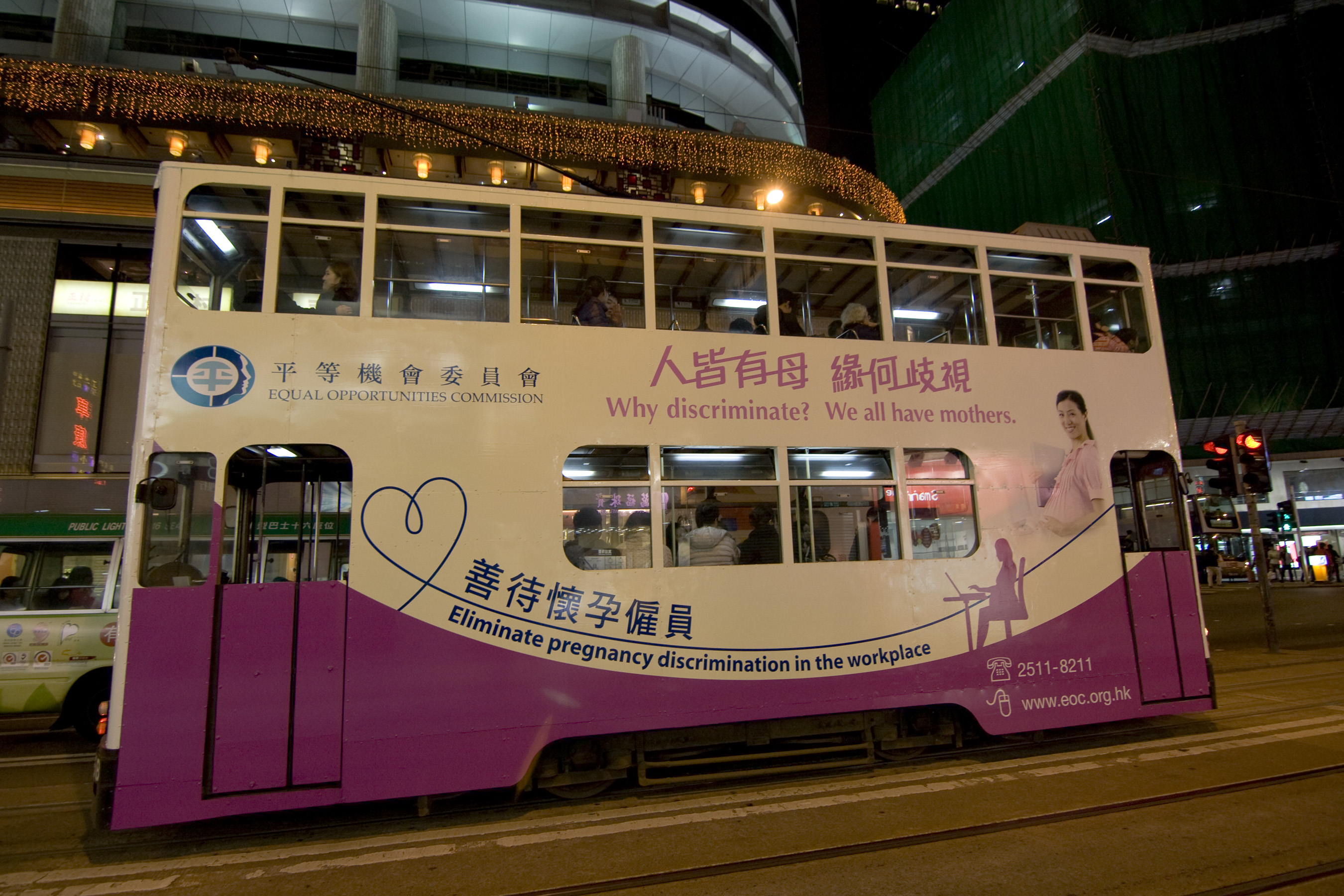
An advertisement of the EOC on a tram

The EOC's main function is to implement the four anti-discrimination ordinances in Hong Kong, namely the Sex Discrimination Ordinance, the Disability Discrimination Ordinance, the Family Status Discrimination Ordinance and the Race Discrimination Ordinance. It aims to promote equal opportunities by receiving complaints and investigating alleged cases of discrimination. If potential discrimination is found in cases, the EOC can provide legal assistance, including representation in court, to the person making the complaint. It also conducts research and offers public educational programmes to promote equal opportunities. From 2018 to 2022, the EOC received 5,014 complaints and decided not to investigate or discontinued the investigation in 79% of the cases.

The EOC also reviews whether the anti-discrimination ordinances are effective and propose changes. Its first anti-discrimination law review began in 2013 and ended in 2016.

The EOC is mainly funded by the Hong Kong government. It can manage its funding, structure and activities without government interference, so long as its operations "reflect the most effective and prudent use of the Government's subventions". In the financial year 2021 to 2022, the EOC had an expenditure of HK$132.4 million and hired 106 members of staff.

A board of up to 16 members and a chairperson, whom are appointed by the Chief Executive of Hong Kong, leads the EOC. Although members can be part-time or full-time, the chairperson must work full-time to oversee the EOC's operation, with a salary determined by the Chief Executive.

== See also ==
- Human rights in Hong Kong
- LGBT rights in Hong Kong
