= Hong Kong Community College =

College in Kowloon, Hong Kong

- 香港專上學院
- Motto: 全人教育 啟發潛能
- Motto in English: Inspiring Potential through Holistic Education
- Type: Public college
- Established: 2001
- Parent institution: Hong Kong Polytechnic University
- Director: Dr Anthony Loh
- Academic staff: around 200
- Students: 9,024 (2021-22)
- Location: PolyU Hung Hom Bay campus Hung Hom, Kowloon; PolyU West Kowloon campus Yau Ma Tei, Kowloon, Hong Kong; 22.312915°N 114.165214°E
- Website: hkcc-polyu.edu.hk

Chinese name
- Traditional Chinese: 香港專上學院
- Simplified Chinese: 香港专上学院
Transcriptions
Standard Mandarin
- Hanyu Pinyin: Xiānggǎng Zhuānshàng Xuéyuàn
Yue: Cantonese
- Yale Romanization: Hēung góng jyūn seuhng hohk yuhn
- Jyutping: Hoeng^{1} gong^{2} zyun^{1} soeng^{6} hok^{6} jyun^{6*2}

Hong Kong Community College (HKCC) is an affiliated and financially self-supporting college of the Hong Kong Polytechnic University, a public research university in Hong Kong. Initially located on the PolyU campus, HKCC now has two campuses separated from the university.

HKCC offers associate degree and higher diploma programmes spanning the domains of arts, science, social sciences, business and the specialised areas of design and health studies for secondary school leavers.

With a floor area totalling over 57,000 square metres (610,000 sq ft), the two campuses provide teaching and recreational facilities, including lecture theatres, classrooms, a library, a computer centre, multi-purpose rooms, halls, sky gardens, a cafeteria and communal areas. Since its establishment, HKCC has helped over 36,600 graduates matriculate into bachelor's degree programmes.

== History ==
The HKCC was first established in rented premises in 2001 and initially provided 800 self-financing sub-degree student places.

On 27 June 2003, the Finance Committee of Hong Kong's Legislative Council approved a loan to the Polytechnic University to be used to construct a campus for HKCC in Hung Hom.

To accommodate the growth of the college, a second campus was opened in Yau Ma Tei.

== Campuses ==
Hong Kong Community College has two campuses:

- PolyU Hung Hom Bay Campus, built in 2007
  - Address: 8 Hung Lok Road, Hung Hom. (near The Hong Kong Polytechnic University and The Hong Kong Polytechnic University Student Halls of Residence)
- PolyU West Kowloon Campus, built in 2008
  - Address: 9 Hoi Ting Road, Yau Ma Tei. (near Charming Garden)

== Associate Degree & Higher Diploma Programmes ==
Associate Degree

Applied Social Sciences	Business	Design
Associate in Applied Social Sciences; Associate in Applied Social Sciences (Counselling for Social Services); Associate in Applied Social Sciences (Psychology); Associate in Applied Social Sciences (Social Policy and Administration); Associate in Applied Social Sciences (Sociology and Culture)	Associate in Business; Associate in Business (Accounting); Associate in Business (Business Management); Associate in Business (Finance); Associate in Business (Hospitality Management); Associate in Business (Human Resources Management); Associate in Business (International Business); Associate in Business (Logistics and Supply Chain Management); Associate in Business (Marketing); Associate in Business (Tourism Management)	Associate in Design (Advertising Design); Associate in Design (Environment and Interior Design); Associate in Design (Moving Image and Interaction Design); Associate in Design (Visual Communication)
Health Studies	Humanities and Communication	Science and Technology
Associate in Health Studies	Associate in Bilingual Communication; Associate in Chinese Language and Literature; Associate in English for Professional Communication; Associate in Language and Culture; Associate in Public Relations and Communication; Associate in Translation and Interpretation; Associate of Arts	Associate in Engineering; Associate in Information Technology; Associate in Statistics and Computing for Business; Associate of Science
Surveying and Built Environment
Associate in Surveying and Built Environment

Higher Diploma

Aircraft Services Engineering	Business	Mechanical Engineering	Social Work
Higher Diploma in Aircraft Services Engineering	Higher Diploma in Event Management; Higher Diploma in Service Management	Higher Diploma in Mechanical Engineering	Higher Diploma in Social Work

== Photos of the campuses ==
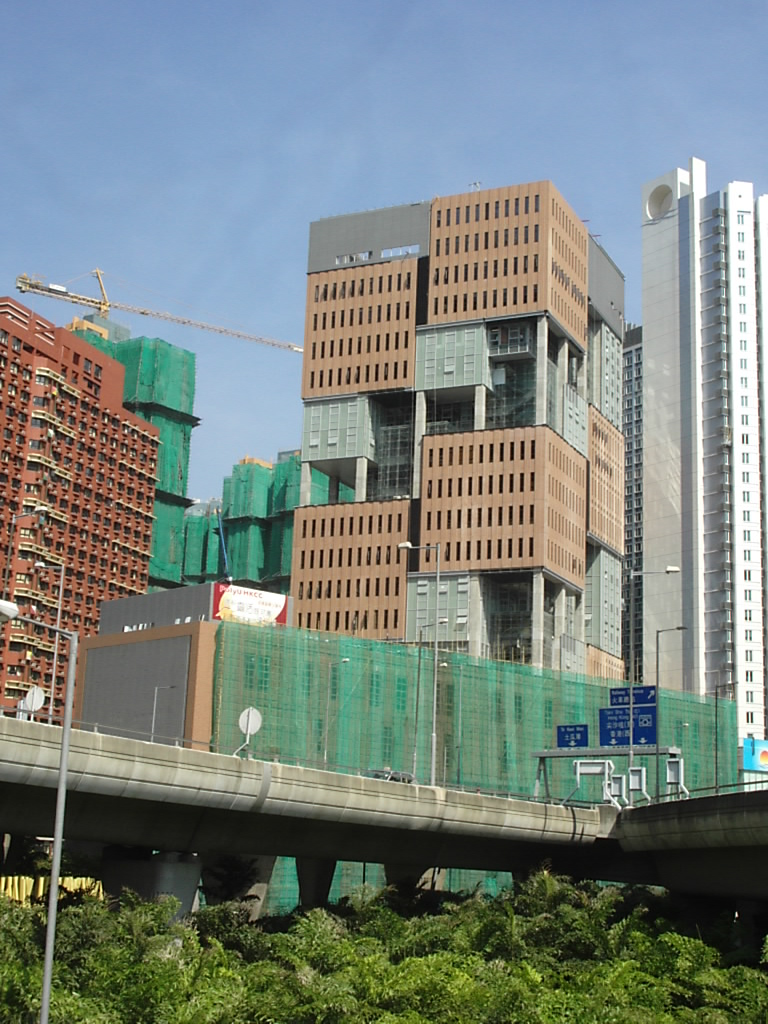
Hung Hom Bay Campus

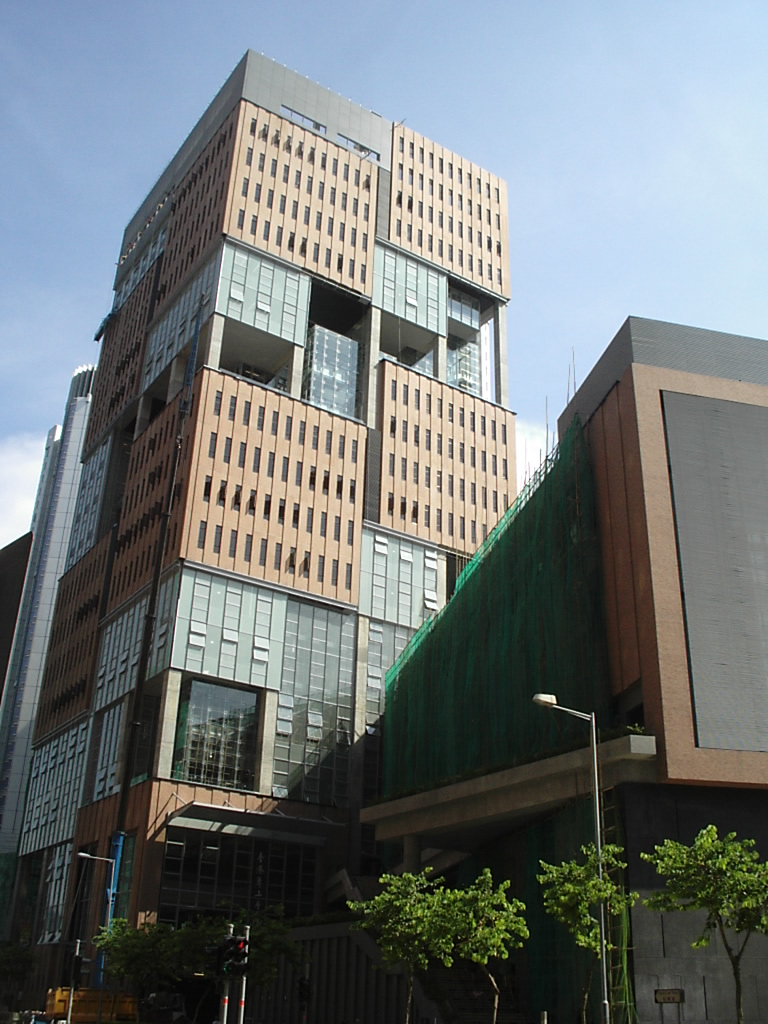
Hung Hom Bay Campus

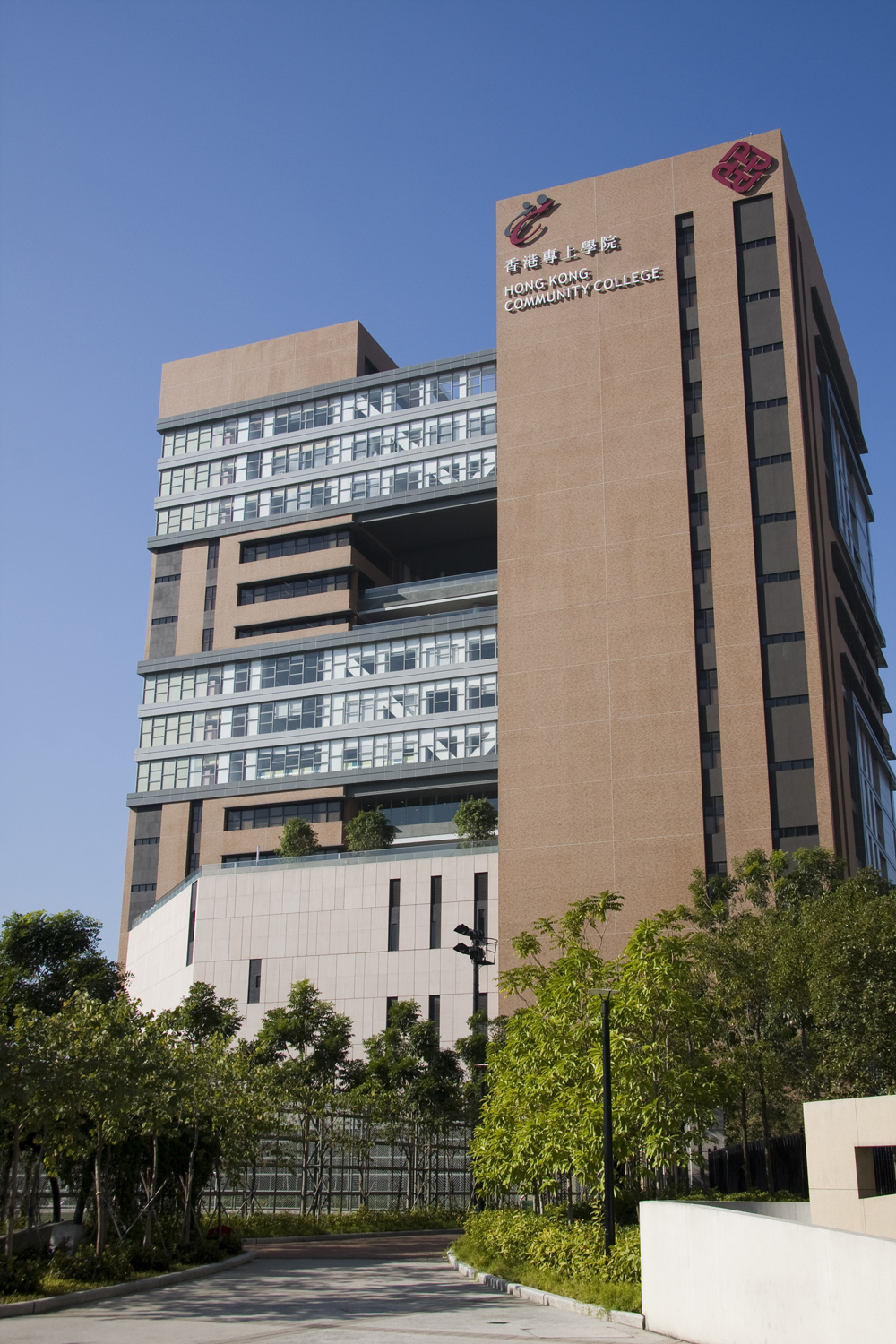
West Kowloon Campus

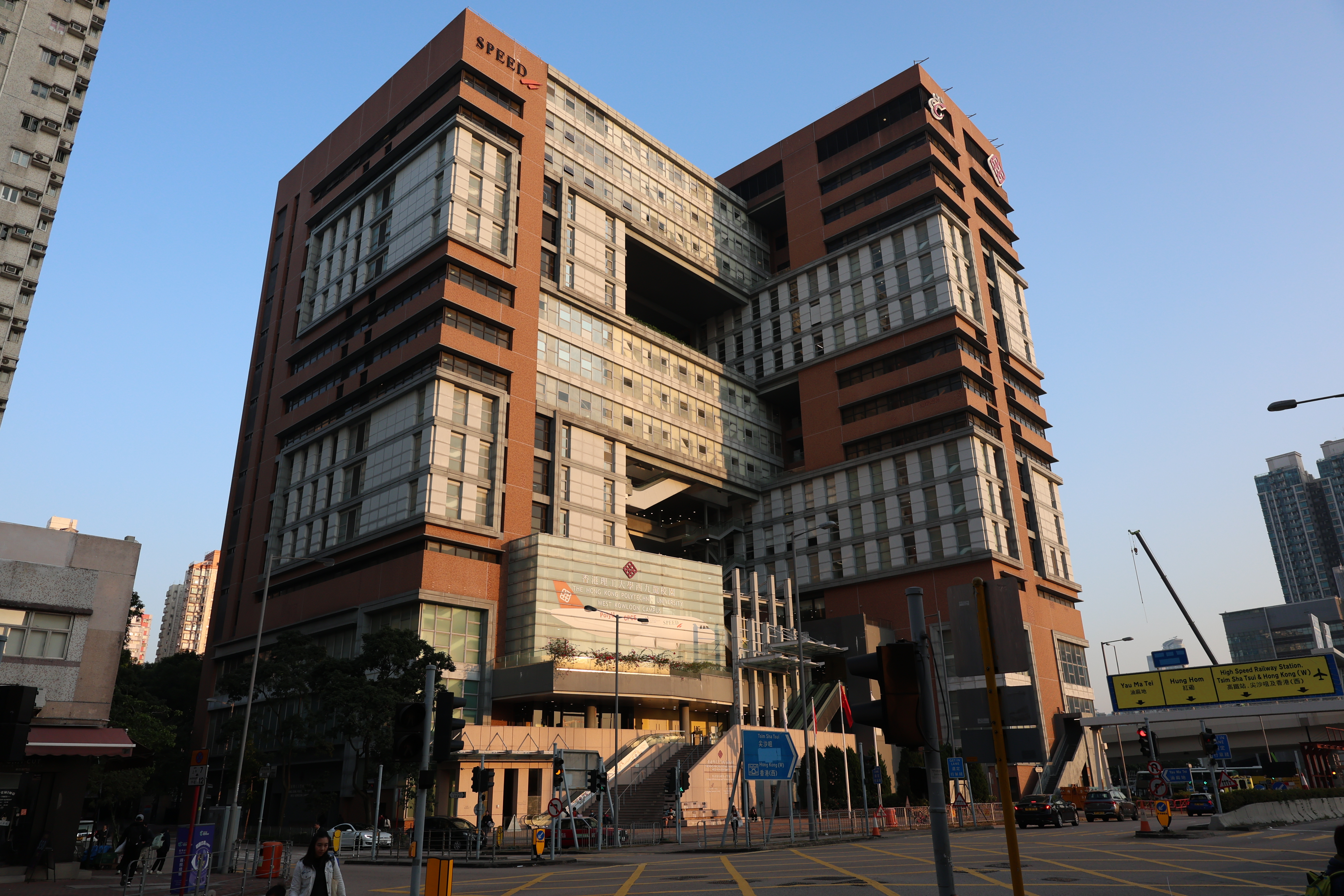
West Kowloon Campus at 2024
