= LGBTQ rights in Hong Kong =

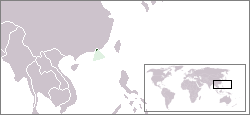
- Hong Kong Special Administrative Region of the People's Republic of China
- Legal status: Female homosexuality: Always legal Male homosexuality: Legal since 1991; Age of consent equalized in 2006
- Gender identity: Change of gender marker recognised without full sex reassignment surgery
- Military: China is responsible for defence
- Discrimination protections: The Hong Kong Bill of Rights Ordinance (Cap. 383) protects individuals against sexual orientation discrimination from the Government and public authorities of the Hong Kong Special Administrative Region

Family rights
- Recognition of relationships: None; though marriages and civil partnerships of same-sex couples are recognised for the purpose of issuing a dependant visa, and for the purpose of spousal benefits; the government was ordered by the Court of Final Appeal to establish legal framework for registered partnerships no later than September 2025
- Adoption: Stepchild adoption since 2021

In Hong Kong, lesbian, gay, bisexual, and transgender (LGBTQ) people may face legal challenges and discrimination not experienced by non-LGBTQ residents. LGBTQ rights are generally seen as poor compared to other countries, with a 2025 report concluding LGBTQ people face exclusion "in various domains, including education, economic well-being, family, health, political and civic participation, and personal security and violence."

Public opinion remains divided on the topic. In a 2022 survey, 86% of 18-40 year old respondents agreed that LGBTQ+ people should be treated fairly and should not discriminated against. However, during public consultation of the proposed Registration of Same-sex Partnerships Bill, the government received 10,775 written submissions, in which "around 80%" were in opposition to the proposal.

== History ==
After the 1967 decriminalisation of homosexuality in the United Kingdom, there were moves to undertake a similar reform in Hong Kong. Governor Murray MacLehose privately supported gay rights but he and others felt that the local community would not support decriminalisation.

== Legality of same-sex sexual activity ==
As a British colony, Hong Kong's criminal laws against male homosexual acts were initially a reflection of British law, with a maximum sentence of life imprisonment. During the 1970s and 1980s, there was a public debate about whether or not to reform the law in line with human rights principles. As a result, in 1991 the Legislative Council agreed to decriminalise private, adult, non-commercial, and consensual homosexual relations.

However, an unequal age of consent was established (21 for gay men and 16 for heterosexuals) with the law remaining silent about lesbianism. LGBT rights groups lobbied the Legislative Council to equalise the age of consent law, but were told by conservative lawmakers that the legal inequality was necessary to protect youth and preserve tradition. A lawsuit was initiated to challenge the unequal age of consent in court.

In 2005, Justice Hartmann found that the unequal age of consent was unconstitutional under the Bill of Rights Ordinance, violating the right to equality. The ruling was upheld by the Court of Appeal, but the provisions were not formally removed from the Crimes Ordinance (Cap. 200) until 2014.

On 30 May 2019, in the Yeung Chu Wing v Secretary for Justice case, the High Court ruled in favour of Yeung Chu-wing, an LGBT activist who brought the lawsuit against the government in 2017, and struck down four further provisions under the Crimes Ordinance (Cap. 200) imposing higher penalties for offences committed by homosexual men. Three further provisions were remedially interpreted such that they would no longer discriminate against homosexuals. It abolished the crimes of "procuring others to commit homosexual buggery" and "gross indecency with or by a man under 16". He also overturned "gross indecency by a man with a man otherwise than in private" and "procuring gross indecency by a man with a man". The three offences that now apply to both genders are "homosexual buggery with or by a man under 16", "gross indecency by a man with a male mentally incapacitated person", and "permitting a young person to resort to or be on a premises or vessel for intercourse, prostitution, buggery or homosexual acts". This comes after 20 years of activism to change these laws, in which the government either refused or delayed, the secretary for justice during the trial, however, conceded to nearly all the changes, and agreed that these laws targeting gay men are incompatible with the Basic Law.

== Recognition of same-sex relationships ==
Same-sex marriage or civil unions are not recognised in Hong Kong.

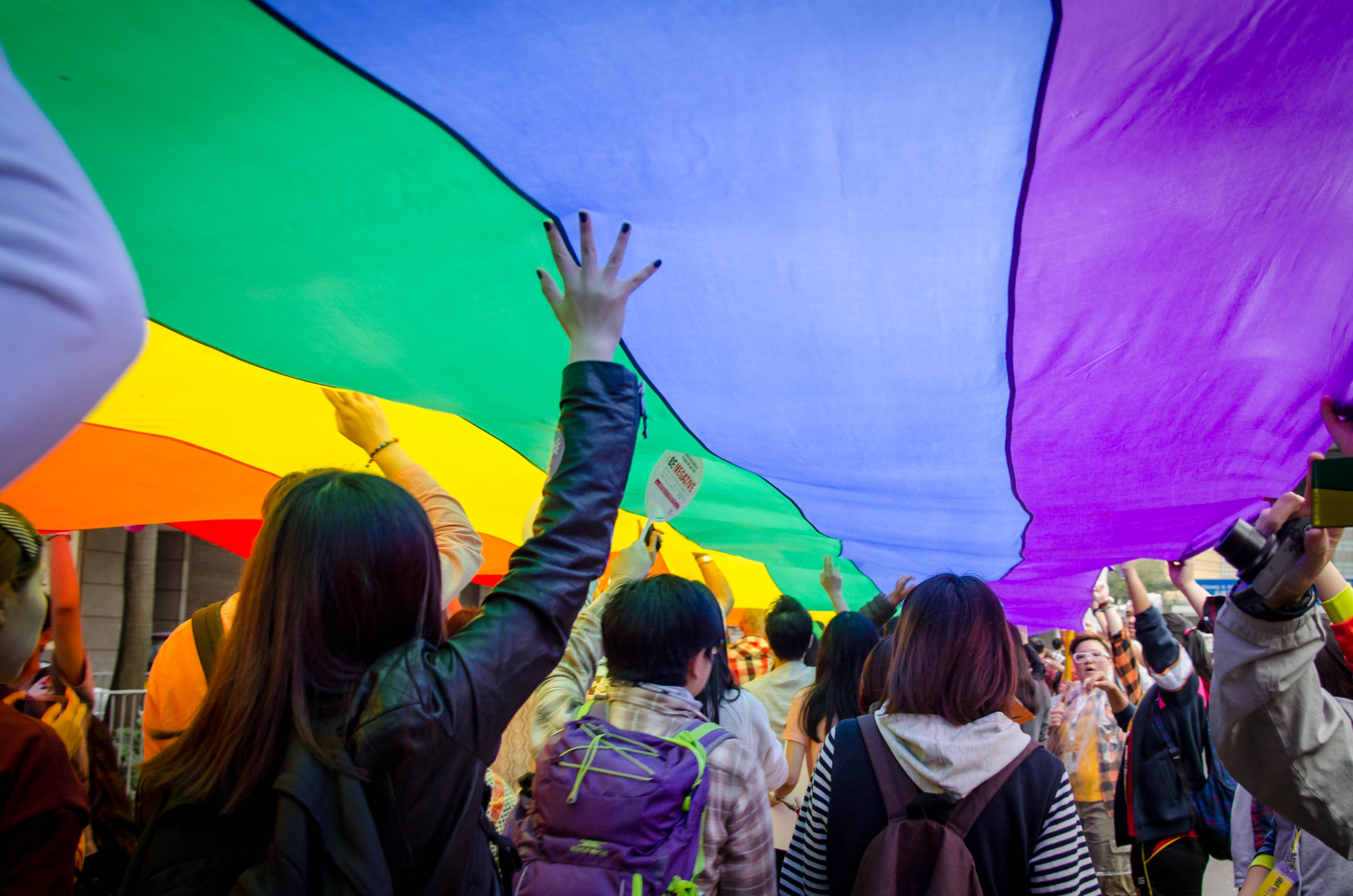
Hong Kong Pride Parade in 2014

Nonetheless, in June 2009, the Hong Kong Government extended limited recognition and protection to cohabitating same-sex couples under the Domestic Violence Ordinance.

In 2013, Hong Kong's High Court ruled that a transgender woman can marry her boyfriend and told the government that they had one year to draft a law that allows for post-operation transsexual or transgender individuals to marry. In spring of 2014, it was announced that though the law had not been finished, transgender citizens could start marrying in July. Some rights activists have expressed their discontent with the provision that a person must have undergone complete gender reassignment surgery to receive a marriage license. On 17 July 2014, it was announced that transgender citizens could marry and that the law will be finished after the summer recess. Some have stated that the delay of the final draft was a positive thing since the subsequent law has "lots of holes and ambiguity".

In July 2018, Chief Executive of Hong Kong Carrie Lam said that the Hong Kong government had no plans to amend the law and approve same-sex marriage in the near future following a landmark ruling in favour of a same-sex couple's dependant visa application, and said though the government respected the court's ruling, the case was not a challenge to Hong Kong's Marriage Ordinance and concerned only the city's immigration policy. In March 2019, she reiterated her position saying that the government was no closer to legalizing same-sex marriage, saying the issue was still "controversial"، but indicated that a recent court ruling in immigration arrangements for same-sex couples who married abroad "does help" to bring overseas talent to the city.

In May 2019, the Equal Opportunities Commission chairman Ricky Chu Man-kin expressed preference for a step-by-step approach, starting with anti-discrimination initiatives, and said he would not push for a legislative timetable on same-sex marriage from the government, but urged the community to "change tack" in favour of a pragmatic step-by-step approach to break the "eternal stalemate" in the city's fight for LGBT rights. He said "Instead of focusing on abstract and ideological debates that we can never easily come to an agreement on, let’s make small progress in tackling discrimination at the workplace, schools and public facilities".

In September 2023, by a 3–2 decision, the court directed the government to establish an alternative framework for the legal recognition of same-sex relationships, with equivalent rights and obligations to marriage, within two years of the ruling. However, the court also ruled that same-sex couples do not have a constitutionally guaranteed right to marry. In July 2025, the government introduced the Registration of Same-sex Partnerships Bill, which would grant same-sex couples who had entered into marriages or civil unions overseas limited rights concerning medical decisions, including rights for hospital visits, shared medical information, organ donation and dealing with a person's remains. The bill faced strong opposition in the opposition-free legislature, with more than half of lawmakers opposing or intending to abstain from voting on the legislation. In September 2025, the bill was vetoed by the legislature with 71 lawmakers voting against and 14 lawmakers voting for.

=== Spousal visas ===
A British woman (referred to as QT) sued the Immigration Department after it declined to recognise her UK civil partnership and refused to grant her a dependant visa. In February 2015, a judge agreed that the plaintiff had been discriminated against and moved the case forward to the Hong Kong High Court. The court heard the case on 14 May 2015. After prolonged deliberation, it dismissed the case in March 2016. The woman appealed to the Court of Appeal, which agreed to hear the case on 15 and 16 June 2017. The appeal was led by prominent human rights barrister Dinah Rose QC.

On 25 September 2017, the Court of Appeal reversed the High Court's dismissal and ruled in favour of the woman, finding that her partner (who works in the city) should be granted a spousal visa. While the legal definition of marriage was not challenged in the appeal, chief judge Andrew Cheung wrote that "times have changed and an increasing number of people are no longer prepared to accept the status quo without critical thought". His Lordship added that the immigration department failed to justify the "indirect discrimination on account of sexual orientation that QT suffers" and that "excluding a foreign worker’s lawfully married (albeit same-sex) spouse or civil partner ... to join the worker is, quite obviously, counter-productive to attracting the worker to come to or remain in Hong Kong". The court ordered the woman and the Department of Immigration to work together on an agreement and submit it to the court within 28 days.

The Immigration Department appealed the ruling to the Court of Final Appeal. The court handed down its ruling on 4 July 2018, finding in favour of the plaintiff and mandating immigration authorities to grant same-sex partners spousal visas that were previously only available only to heterosexual couples. The panel of judges, led by Chief Justice Geoffrey Ma Tao-li, held that the "policy [of not granting a visa] is counterproductive and plainly not rationally connected to advancing [any] 'talent' aim" and rejected the immigration director's argument that civil union partnerships differed from marriage, saying it was based on a "shaky foundation [and]...hardly satisfactory". The government stated it respected the court's ruling and would study it in detail. The ruling became effective on 19 September 2018, when the Director of Immigration announced that it will favourably consider an application from a person who has entered into "a same-sex civil partnership, same-sex civil union, same-sex marriage, or opposite-sex civil partnership or opposite-sex civil union outside Hong Kong" for entry for residence as a dependant, if the person meets the normal immigration requirements.

=== Taxation and spousal benefits ===
In 2014, Hong Kong immigration officer Angus Leung Chun-kwong married his same-sex partner, Scott Adams, in New Zealand. After the wedding, Leung attempted to update his marital status with the Civil Service Bureau, which states that officers' benefits can extend to their spouses. The Bureau, however, rejected Leung's attempts to extend these benefits to Adams, prompting a legal challenge. On 28 April 2017, the Hong Kong High Court ruled in Leung's favour. In his landmark ruling, Mr Justice Anderson Chow Ka-ming called the Bureau's policy "indirect discrimination" and rejected its claim that it had "to act in line with the prevailing marriage law of Hong Kong" and that extending benefits to Leung's spouse would "undermine the integrity of the institution of marriage". The ruling was supposed to take effect on 1 September 2017 and would have offered the same-sex partners of government employees who married overseas the same benefits as heterosexual couples. In May, however, the Hong Kong Government appealed the ruling. The Court of Appeal began examining the case in December 2017, and ruled against the couple on 1 June 2018. The Court of Appeal ruled that there is "legitimate aim" to protect opposite-sex marriage, arguing that only straight couples should enjoy the "freedom of marriage" and that same-sex couples should have no marital rights whatsoever. The Court also stated that Leung and Adams could not pay taxes as a couple. The couple appealed the decision to the Court of Final Appeal. The appeal was heard on 7 May 2019. On 6 June 2019, the Court of Final Appeal reversed the ruling of the Court of Appeal, holding that both the Civil Service Bureau and the Inland Revenue Department had unlawfully discriminated against the couple. The ruling became effective on 19 September 2018, when the Hong Kong government has amended its rule book to allow same-sex couples to file joint tax returns, a spokeswoman for the Inland Revenue Department confirmed the change, and said same-sex married couples could now submit joint tax assessment through the electronic filing system or in paper form. LGBT activists hailed the change for same-sex married couples but said it should also be extended to those in same-sex civil partnerships.

=== Legal challenges ===
In January 2019 the Hong Kong High Court agreed to hear two challenges to the city's refusal to recognise same-sex marriage. The two separate legal challenges were mounted by a 21-year-old University of Hong Kong student, known as TF, and a 31-year-old activist, known as STK, who argued that the inability of same-sex couples to get married violated their right to equality under the city's Bill of Rights and the Basic Law. The judge in the case gave the applications license to be heard by the court, though suspended them to first hear another case involving a 29-year-old lesbian, who is seeking for a civil union partnership system to be implemented in Hong Kong.

=== Civil Partnership and Same Sex Marriage and British Nationals (Overseas) ===
Neither same sex marriage nor civil partnerships registered inside or outside Hong Kong are recognised by the Law of Hong Kong. However, many Hong Kong residents are also a British National (Overseas). By virtue of the passage of Civil Partnership (Registration Abroad and Certificates) Order 2005 in the UK, all British nationals, including British Nationals (Overseas), are allowed to register civil partnerships with a limited number of British consulates or embassies abroad. Thus, LGBT Hong Kong couples, where one of the couple hold British national status, enjoy the right to register civil partnerships with British consulates in 22 countries.

Arranging a civil partnership registration with a British consulate generally takes at least a month and must be done in person in the country where the consulate is located. Those whose British National (Overseas) passports have expired or who no longer hold a valid passport need to apply for a renewal before arranging a civil partnership registration with a British consulate.

The British Consulate-General in Hong Kong refrains from providing such a service to British nationals because UK law requires the Hong Kong government's objection to them to be respected. Thus, British nationals are able to apply for a same-sex civil partnership ceremony with British consulates or embassies in the following 22 countries.

Oceania	Australia							
North America	Costa Rica	Guatemala						
South America	Argentina	Colombia	Peru	Uruguay	Venezuela			
Asia	Israel	Japan	Mongolia	Philippines	Turkmenistan	Vietnam		
Europe	Austria	Bulgaria	Croatia	Hungary	Ireland	Latvia	Moldova	Portugal

=== Civil partnerships court case ===
In June 2018, arguing that her right to privacy and equality had been violated, amounting to a breach of the Basic Law and the Hong Kong Bill of Rights Ordinance, a Hong Kong lesbian woman known as "MK" sued the Hong Kong Government for denying her the right to enter into a civil partnership with her female partner. The High Court heard the case in a preliminary brief 30-minute chambers hearing in August 2018. In April 2019, a judge rejected a bid by the Catholic Diocese of Hong Kong and other conservative groups to join litigation and ruled that the court can not arbitrate on social or theological issues and works only on legal considerations, as the counsel for the Catholic Diocese claimed that the outcome of the court case could lead to 'reverse discrimination' and create a chilling effect on the church.

The case was heard on 28 and 29 May 2019. During the hearings, Stewart Wong, a government lawyer, defended the existing law, saying: "Not all differences in treatment are unlawful. You are not supposed to treat unequal cases alike. To recognise an alternative form of same-sex relationships which we say is tantamount to [marriage] is to undermine the traditional institution of marriage and the family constituted by such a marriage". Arguing that civil union partnerships carry the same legal rights as a marriage, but generally do not include the ceremony and exchanges of wedding vows. That made marriage and civil unions effectively identical "in substance", the government lawyer said, explaining why the government had objected to both for same-sex couples.

In October 2019, the Court of First Instance ruled against MK, upholding the existing marriage law and continuing to deny civil partnerships to same-sex couples. Judge Anderson Chow wrote, "The evidence before the court is not, in my view, sufficiently strong or compelling to demonstrate that the changing or contemporary social needs and circumstances in Hong Kong are such as would require the word ‘marriage’ in Basic Law Article 37 to be read as including a marriage between two persons of the same sex," and that the government had no legal obligation to provide substitute arrangements to same-sex couples, such as civil unions or civil partnerships. He added that "Whether there should, or should not, be a legal framework for the recognition of same-sex relationships is quintessentially a matter for legislation," meaning that the issue was more suited for the Legislative Council of Hong Kong.

=== Civil unions legislative motion ===
In November 2018, openly gay legislator Raymond Chan Chi-chuen proposed a motion to study civil unions for same-sex couples, but this was voted down in the Legco by 27 to 24.

=== Public housing ===
On 4 March 2020, the Hong Kong government's policy of denying legally married same-sex couples the right to apply for public housing was declared unlawful and unconstitutional by the High Court. Furthermore, on 26 November 2024, the Court of Final Appeal ruled that foreign unionised same-sex couples had to be treated equally under the Public Rental Housing Scheme and the Home Ownership Scheme, granting them equal housing rights.

== Adoption and parenting ==
Since 2021, step-child adoption has been affirmed for same-sex couples by a case from the Court Of First Instance in AA v BB (also known as S v KG) which granted a lesbian couple guardianship rights over their two children following a separation of the couple. The case has established a judicial mechanism for couples to obtain equal parental rights. The court ruled that following the breakdown of the relationship the non-biological mother should be granted joint custody, shared care and guardianship rights of her children, despite not being legally recognized as the children's mother. Under Cap. 13 Guardianship of Minors Ordinance, the legislation allows the jurisdiction of the Court Of First Instance full control over appointing or removing guardians.

== Discrimination protections ==
The Hong Kong Bill of Rights Ordinance was utilised to strike down discrimination in the age of consent in the case of Leung TC William Roy v. Secretary for Justice (2005). However, this does not protect against governmental discrimination in services and goods. Since the 1990s, LGBT rights groups have lobbied the Legislative Council to enact civil rights laws that include sexual orientation, but without success.

In 1993, former legislator Anna Wu proposed an Equal Opportunities Bill through a private member's bill to outlaw discrimination on a variety of grounds, including sex, disability, age, race, and sexuality. Her effort didn't yield any results until 1995 when the equal opportunities law was enacted. However, sexuality was not included in the final version of the bill that was passed.

Political opposition tends to come from social conservatives, often with evangelical Christian ties, who view homosexuality and cross-dressing as signs of immorality. For example, after the court ruled against the unequal age of consent, former Chief Executive of Hong Kong Donald Tsang, a devout Catholic, publicly opposed the court's decision and fought for an appeal until 2006. However, most political parties and individual politicians have tended to avoid making public statements in favour of LGBT rights, although this has slowly begun to change.

In 2010, legislator Fernando Cheung, and former legislators Cyd Ho Sau-lan, Lo Wing-lok, and Reverend Fung Chi Wood participated in public demonstration against homophobia.

As of 2026, there are no laws against discrimination on the grounds of sexual orientation and gender identity in Hong Kong.

In 2016, efforts by the Equal Opportunities Commission to prompt the government to enact anti-discrimination legislation based on sexual orientation and gender identity failed. The commission made a proposal to the administration following a survey the same year, which found 55.7% of people in Hong Kong backed such protections.

In June 2019, Ricky Chu Man-kin, head of the Equal Opportunities Commission says he intends to add anti-discrimination protections based on sexual orientation and gender identity to existing laws. He said his approach would involve inserting protections into existing laws rather than advocating for one overarching legislation, as in the past. He plans draft laws and fine-tune them after hearing the views of opposing parties before submitting them to the government.

== Gender identity and expression ==
Cross-dressing per se is not illegal. Hong Kong law allows the change of legal documents such as the identity card, and passport, but does not allow the birth certificate to be changed. Such change has historically required sex reassignment surgery which includes the removal of reproductive organs, effectively rendering the person sterile in exchange for legal recognition of gender identity.

=== Marriage ===
On 13 May 2013, the Court of Final Appeal of Hong Kong ruled in W v Registrar of Marriages that a trans woman has the right to marry her boyfriend in her affirmed gender, establishing the right of transgender people to enter into heterosexual marriages as their affirmed gender. Previously, a trans person could only marry someone of the other legal sex; that is, a trans woman could legally marry a cisgender woman, but not a cis man or a trans woman.

=== Gender recognition ===
There is no gender recognition framework in Hong Kong for transgender Hongkongers to be fully legally recognized as their identified sex. While trans people can apply to have the gender marker on their Hong Kong ID (HKID) cards changed, it is not an absolute reflection of their legal sex, which is ambiguous and not legally protected, although marriage and bathroom access rights are legally guaranteed by court rulings. The gender marker on birth certificates cannot be changed.

==== Tse v Commissioner of Registration ====
In 2019, three trans men lost their legal bid to be recognised as male on their Hong Kong identity cards. While expressing sympathy, High Court judge Mr Justice Thomas Au Hing-cheung ruled against the three applicants, Henry Tse, Q, and R, who had all been legally recognised as men by the British government but were unable to get their gender changed on their Hong Kong ID cards. The judge said that a complete sex change would be the only "workable way" for the local government to determine a person's gender. Although the trio, all born female, identify as men, and have had their breasts removed and undergone hormone therapy, they all still have their uterus and ovaries – which was the point of contention in their legal challenges against the city's commissioner of registration. The applicants appealed the decision.

In February 2023, the Court of Final Appeal ruled in favour of the applicants, that the government's surgery requirements were unconstitutional and unacceptably burdensome. The ruling was implemented in April 2024, although select surgical treatment to modify sex characteristics is still required for a change in ID marker, as well as hormonal blood tests.

On 3 April 2024, the Hong Kong government announced a policy revision, effective immediately, allowing individuals who have undergone specific gender-affirming surgeries (mastectomy for trans men; penectomy and orchiectomy for trans women), but not the full set of gender reassignment procedures (such as vaginoplasty or phalloplasty), to apply for a gender marker change on their Hong Kong ID card. Applicants must meet criteria such as providing medical proof, living as their identified gender for at least two years, and undergoing continuous hormone therapy.

The previous policy of requiring full sex reassignment was declared unconstitutional in February 2023 in Tse Henry Edward v Commissioner of Registration, in which the Court of Final Appeal found such requirement violated transgender persons' right to privacy under Article 14 of the Bill of Rights. The government's new policy was published in response to the apex court decision.

=== Public lavatories ===
On 23 July 2025, the High Court handed down a decision in K v Secretary for Environment and Ecology that government regulation prohibiting trans people from using public toilets that match their lived gender identity was unconstitutional under the right to equality under Hong Kong's Basic Law.

=== Migrant Domestic Workers ===
Legal protections and recognition for migrant workers particularly domestic helpers especially those who come from The Philippines, Indonesia and other countries is challenging because of the absence of legal gender recognition.

Sometimes tomboi, lesbian, butch gender expressions among migrant domestic helpers may possibly include transmasculine identities that do not publicly identify or could not label their identity as transmasculine or its equivalent in Filipino, Bahasa among other nationalities. Studies on migrant workers may be grouped under the identities LGBT or gays and lesbians, but may actually be transgender. Since Hong Kong does not have legal gender recognition, and the Philippines and Indonesia also do not have legal gender recognition laws, transitioning will be difficult for these migrant workers. The respective religions and faiths of the foreign migrant workers can also have challenging influences to transition and openly express their gender identity and expression hence the overarching identity tomoboi.

=== Discrimination ===
Despite recent advances in judicial and legislative equality, transgender individuals in Hong Kong are often subjected to social stigmatization and marginalization. Trans people in the region face a high rate of rejection, victimization and discrimination, with the use of public toilets being a notable source of anxiety, where trans people report being susceptible to verbal, physical and sexual abuse. Social marginalization has led to negative mental health effects among trans Hongkongers, who disproportionately experience moderate-to-severe levels of depressive and anxiety symptoms. Hongkongers who have had contact with trans people are more likely to hold positive views of them, and attitudes towards trans acceptance is directly correlated with educational level.

On 16 September 2013, trans woman Eliana Rubashkyn was discriminated against and sexually abused by Hong Kong airport customs officers, forcing international organisations like the United Nations and Hong Kong NGOs to provide assistance as a refugee becoming a stateless person. She endured an invasive body search for more than nine hours.

== LGBT rights movement in Hong Kong ==
In the early 1990s, the first two LGBT rights groups, HORIZONS and the Ten Percent Club, were established. Today, several organisations, most notably Rainbow of Hong Kong, Rainbow Action, and Tongzhi Culture Society, exist to campaign for LGBT rights and to organise various public educational and social events.

The Constitutional and Mainland Affairs Bureau established the Gender Identity and Sexual Orientation Unit in 2005, to enhance the equal opportunities for people of different sexual orientations, and transgender people.

In August 2012, the Constitutional and Mainland Affairs Bureau started sponsoring a series of Public Service Announcement broadcasts through about the need for equal treatment when employing anyone who is LGBT.

== Living conditions ==
Along with several gay nightclubs, LGBT pride festivals occur annually, as well as other social events including the Hong Kong Lesbian & Gay Film Festival. On each International Day Against Homophobia (IDAHO), a procession is held through the street of Hong Kong to show solidarity. The first IDAHO procession was held in 2005. Political involvement has also become more common in recent years. Several prominent legislators have attended the IDAHO procession and gay pride to show solidarity with the LGBT community.

As the government cannot discriminate against LGBT persons, as stipulated in the Bills of Rights, LGBT people may not legally be hindered in their access to services provided by the Hong Kong government. For example, when applying for non-contribution base Job Seeker's Allowance (Comprehensive Social Security Allowance), one must satisfy the means test component. In order to satisfy the means test component, the Social Welfare Department takes into account the income of family members living together irrespective of their sexual orientation.

In May 2019, a Cathay Pacific advertisement featuring a same-sex couple which showed two men strolling hand in hand along a beach was banned by Airport Authority Hong Kong and MTR Corporation. Both overturned their position a day after widespread public criticism and outrage by the ban, and it was restored in displays days later.

=== Representation in the media ===
Since the 1990s, several Hong Kong films have had LGBT characters or themes in them. However, television programming has largely tended to avoid LGBT characters or themes, until recently.

In 2006, Radio Television Hong Kong (RTHK) broadcast a television film called Gay Lovers, which received criticism from social conservatives for "encouraging" people to become gay. In 2007, the Broadcasting Authority ruled that the RTHK-produced programme "Gay Lovers" was "unfair, partial and biased towards homosexuality, and having the effect of promoting the acceptance of homosexual marriage." On 5 May 2008 Justice Michael Hartmann overturned the ruling of the Broadcasting Authority that the programme's discussion on same sex marriage was deemed to have breached broadcasting guidelines for not including anti-gay views.

As social attitudes have become more open and accepting in Hong Kong, more artists and prominent persons have become open about discussing their sexual orientation publicly.

Chet Lam (林一峰), a Hong Kong folk singer, came out to the public through an interview with The Advocate (UK).

In April 2012, well known artist, Anthony Wong (黃耀明), came out as gay during one of his concert series, with fans giving him a very positive response.

In September 2012, newly elected lawmaker Ray Chan Chi-chuen (陳志全), a former radio and TV host, revealed to Oriental Daily that he is gay, making him the first openly gay legislator in Greater China. Local media coverage of his coming out as gay was largely positive.

On 10 November 2012, Denise Ho (何韻詩) announced her sexual orientation on stage at the "Dare to Love" event during the Hong Kong Pride Parade 2012. She called herself "tongzhi" (同志) a Chinese slang word for gay. She is the first mainstream female singer in Hong Kong to come out.

=== Public opinion ===
Opinion polling shows a trend toward increasing public support of LGBT equality.

In a 2013 poll conducted by the University of Hong Kong, 33.3% of respondents supported same-sex marriage for same-sex couples, with 43% being opposed. Another poll conducted by the Liberal Party showed that 29% supported same-sex marriage while 59% were against it.

A survey conducted by the University of Hong Kong in 2014 showed that 27% supported same-sex marriage while 12% said that they somewhat agreed. At the same time, the same poll found out that 74% of the respondents agreed that same-sex couples should have the same or some rights enjoyed by heterosexual couples.

A 2017 University of Hong Kong poll found that 50.4% of respondents supported same-sex marriage.

A 2019 CUHK survey found that 60% agreed and 12% disagreed that there should be increased anti-discrimination legal protections for people of different sexual orientations, an increase in support from 56% agree and 35% disagree in 2016. The survey found that 49% agreed and 23% disagreed that a homosexual should be able to marry their partner. However, when the question was framed in terms of legal recognition of same-sex marriage, 44% agreed and 27% disagreed. The survey also found that 54% would react negatively and 10% positively if a business openly opposes anti-discrimination laws.

Following Taiwan's recognition of same-sex marriage, 49% viewed the development positively and 16% negatively.

Younger people and non-religious people were more likely to support an anti-discrimination ordinance and same-sex marriage.

A 2022 Public Opinion Research Institute poll commissioned by Pink Alliance found that among residents aged 18 to 40, 86% agreed that LGBTQ+ people should be treated fairly and should not be discriminated against, 75% supported same-sex marriage, and 63% supported anti-discrimination legislation.

In May 2023, a survey showed that 60% of Hongkongers agreed with same-sex marriage.

==== Transgender rights ====
In a 2019 CUHK survey, 59% agreed and 9% disagreed that transgender people should be able to freely express their gender.

=== Professional opinion ===
==== The Hong Kong College of Psychiatrists ====
On 15 November 2011, the Hong Kong College of Psychiatrists, as a licensing body of professional psychiatrists in Hong Kong, published an announcement stating that homosexuality is not an illness and there is no scientifically proven evidence to support the attempts to change one's sexual orientation. Until February 2012, the announcement has not been uploaded onto the college's website or published in any professional journals; it is, however, available in electronic pdf format upon request. The Hong Kong College of Psychiatrists is the very first professional authority in Asia that explicitly and publicly opined their professional standing on issues regarding homosexuality and treatments altering one's sexual orientation.

The Hong Kong College of Psychiatrists opines that homosexuality is not a psychiatric disorder...The Hong Kong College of Psychiatrists adheres firmly to the practice of scientifically proven and evidence-based treatment. Psychiatric treatments have to be provided according to well established principles and practice available at the time. There is, at present, no sound scientific and clinical evidence supporting the benefits of attempts to alter sexual orientation.

==== The Hong Kong Psychological Society ====
In light of the absence of practice guidelines for lesbians, gays, and bisexual individuals for psychologists in Hong Kong, the Hong Kong Psychological Society, as both a learned society and a professional association, formed a work group in July 2011 to tackle the problem. On 1 August 2012, the Society published a position paper titled, Position Paper for Psychologists Working with Lesbians, Gays, and Bisexual (LGB) Individuals. There are 11 major guidelines in this position paper:

Psychologists understand that homosexuality and bisexuality are not mental illnesses.
Psychologists understand that homosexual, bisexual, and heterosexual attractions, feelings, and behaviour constitute normal variants of human sexuality.
Psychologists understand that efforts to change sexual orientation are not proven to be effective or harmless.
When using and disseminating information on sexual orientation, psychologists fully and accurately represent research findings that are based on rigorous scientific research design and are careful to avoid any possible misuse or misrepresentation of these findings.
Psychologists understand the societal stigma imposed on LGB individuals and the effects on their lives.
Psychologists always act to ensure the public is accurately informed about sexual orientation and LGB-related issues.
Psychologists are aware of their own attitudes, beliefs and knowledge about sexual orientation and LGB individuals' lives and experiences. They do not impose personal beliefs or standards about sexual orientation when they are offering professional services.
Psychologists understand the distinction between sexual orientation and gender identity and expression. Stereotypical gender conformity or non-conformity is not necessarily indicative of one's sexual orientation.
Psychologists understand the heterogeneity among LGB individuals (e.g., sex, gender, age, socioeconomic status, physical and mental abilities, race, marital status, parental status, and religious beliefs).
Psychologists are respectful of LGB individuals' choice to disclose or not to disclose their sexual orientation.
Psychologists advocate for an inclusive society and the promotion of equal opportunity. This includes advocating for the elimination of homophobia, biphobia, discrimination, bullying, harassment, or any form of stigmatization towards LGB individuals.

==== Hong Kong Association of Doctors in Clinical Psychology (HKADCP) ====
HKADCP's Code of Ethics ensures the HKADCP Registered Clinical Psychologists avoid discrimination in all forms and are sensitive to power differentials in dealing with current and former clients, employers, employees, and peers by striving to protect individuals who may be in a position of lower power. They are particularly sensitive to the needs of underprivileged and otherwise vulnerable individuals.

=== Civil Service vacancies ===
The Government, at all levels, is not allowed to have any unjustified differential treatments on ground of sexual orientation as a direct result of a series of high-profile court cases. Particularly, in Secretary for Justice v Yau Yuk Lung Zigo, the Court of Final Appeal ruled that one's sexual orientation is a protected status against discrimination under the provisions of Articles 25 and 39 of the Basic Law and Articles 1 and 22 of the Bill of Rights Ordinance. Because of this interpretation from the judiciary, the Government has the responsibility to actively ensure all its policies, decisions, and actions are free of sexual orientation discrimination. The Basic Law and the Bill of Rights Ordinance only bind the Government, its agencies, and its representatives, but not private companies. As such, the general notes section of civil service vacancies advertisements include the assertion: "As an Equal Opportunities Employer, the Government is committed to eliminating discrimination in employment. The vacancy advertised is open to all applicants meeting the basic entry requirement irrespective of their disability, sex, marital status, pregnancy, age, family status, sexual orientation and race." In addition, current government employees who feel discriminated against or suffer from unfair treatment because of their sexual orientation may seek legal advice and may file civil actions against the Government in court.

=== Business sector ===
Since homosexuality is still a sensitive issue in Hong Kong, discrimination based on sexual orientation in the corporate sector is not unknown. LGBT employees are often victims of various levels of discrimination or harassment. Most companies do not include sexual orientation in their diversity and inclusion policies. And, with no legislation protecting LGBT employees, the situation remains unresolved. This is also true for multinational corporations. Although many US- or Europe-based companies in Hong Kong may have non-discrimination policies protecting their LGBT employees in their home countries, most do not adopt such practices in Hong Kong. Such a phenomenon makes many local employees and even expatriates vulnerable to discrimination.

For many years, leading advocate groups such as Community Business, have worked to promote and advance the extension of non-discrimination policies in the corporate sector for LGBT minorities. Only a limited number of multinational companies have explicitly embraced such policies, namely Goldman Sachs and IBM. Only a handful of local and mainland China-based companies have extended non-discrimination protection to LGBT employees, including blue-chip stock companies.

== Summary table ==
Same-sex sexual activity legal	Yes (Since 1991)
Equal age of consent	Yes (Since 2006)
Anti-discrimination	No
Anti-discrimination laws in employment	No
Anti-discrimination laws in the provision of goods and services	No
Anti-discrimination laws in all other areas (incl. indirect discrimination, hate speech)	No
Same-sex marriage(s)	No
Recognition of same-sex couples	No / Yes (Pending as of September 2025)
Step-child adoption by same-sex couples	Yes (Since 2021)
Joint adoption by same-sex couples	No
Adoption by single people regardless of sexual orientation	Yes
Gays and lesbians allowed to serve openly in the military	Not applicable / not prohibited by law (PLA is responsible for national defence)
Right to change legal gender	Yes
Access to IVF for lesbians	No
Commercial surrogacy for gay male couples	No
MSMs allowed to donate blood	Yes (since 2017, 6-month deferral period)

== See also ==
- LGBT rights in Asia
- LGBT rights in China
- LGBT rights in Macau
- LGBT culture in Hong Kong
- Recognition of same-sex unions in China
- Human rights in Hong Kong
- Same-sex union court cases
- HIV/AIDS in Hong Kong
