= LGBTQ rights in China =

LGBTQ rights in the People's Republic of China
- People's Republic of China Territory claimed but not controlled
- Legal status: Legal since 1997
- Gender identity: Legal with surgery
- Military: Unknown
- Discrimination protections: None (see below)

Family rights
- Recognition of relationships: No recognition of same-sex couples
- Adoption: Illegal

Lesbian, gay, bisexual, transgender and queer (LGBTQ) people in the People's Republic of China (PRC) face legal and social challenges that are not experienced by non-LGBTQ people. While both male and female same-sex sexual activity are legal, same-sex couples are currently unable to marry or adopt, and households headed by such couples are ineligible for the same legal protections available to heterosexual couples. No explicit anti-discrimination protections for LGBTQ people are present in its legal system, nor do hate crime laws cover sexual orientation or gender identity.

In the modern era, social media in China greatly censored support for LGBTQ members. This aspect extends to the film industry, where films with gay characters are removed from Chinese websites. Even famous athletes cannot post content that promotes public LGBTQ activities on their own social media account without the government taking it down. In 2018, many Chinese citizens thought that China was heading in a more modern more friendly direction that included LGBTQ people after a famous hashtag went viral. However that same year, when schools tried to promote anti homophobia the Chinese government shut it down. Universities tried associating with public chats that promoted LGBTQ connections but it was shut down by the government. To combat the familial pressures, some families took to fake marriages in order to uphold their families expectations. ( In recent years China has made some strides in the advancement of LGBTQ members. With many families putting the interest in their children over other peoples opinions. There is still traditional values for many Chinese families but that is not always the case for every family.

Homosexuality and homoeroticism in China have been documented since ancient times. Historical discrimination towards homosexuality in much of the region include the ban on homosexual acts enforced by Genghis Khan in the Mongol Empire, which made male homosexuality punishable by death. As early as the 17th century, the Manchu–ruled Qing courts began to use the term jījiān (雞姦) for homosexual anal intercourse. In 1740, an anti-homosexual decree was promulgated, defining voluntary homosexual intercourse between adults as illegal. The punishment allegedly included a month in prison and 80 heavy blows with heavy bamboo.

While there were not laws explicitly prohibiting homosexuality in Maoist China, according to author Elaine Jeffreys, it was still "seen as a form of degeneracy originating in capitalist societies." In the 1980s, the subject of homosexuality reemerged in the public domain and gay identities and communities have expanded in the public eye since then. However, the studies note that public discourse in China appears uninterested and, at best, ambivalent about homosexuality, and traditional sentiments on family obligations and discrimination remains a significant factor deterring same-sex attracted people from coming out. Since the late 2010s, authorities have avoided showing homosexual relationships on TV shows. Under Chinese Communist Party (CCP) general secretary Xi Jinping, LGBTQ venues and events have been forced to shut and LGBTQ rights activists have become subject to greater scrutiny by the country's system of mass surveillance. The CCP increasingly considers LGBTQ advocacy the work of "foreign forces." LGBTQ content is censored. Authors of boys' love works are routinely arrested and criminally prosecuted.

In 2025, China voted against a motion to renew the mandate of the United Nations Independent Expert on Sexual Orientation and Gender Identity at the United Nations Human Rights Council.

== History and timeline ==
=== Shang dynasty ===
The earliest records of homosexuality and same-sex relations in China date from the Shang dynasty era. The term luan feng was used to describe homosexuality. No records of lesbian relations exist, however. In this time, homosexuality was largely viewed with indifference and usually treated with openness.

=== Zhou dynasty ===
Several stories of homosexual love during the Zhou dynasty are well known, even to this day. One such story refers to Duke Xian of Jin (reigned 676–651 BCE) planting a handsome young man in a rival's court in order to influence the other ruler with the young man's sexual charm and to give him bad advice. A more exalted example is the relationship of Mi Zixia and Duke Ling of Wei. Mizi Xia's sharing of an especially delicious peach with his lover was referenced by later writers as yútáo (餘桃), or "the leftover peach". Another example of homosexuality at the highest level of society from the Warring States period is the story of King Anxi of Wei and his lover Lord Long Yang.

Homosexuality was widely referenced during this period through popular literature. Poet Qu Yuan is said to have expressed his love for the ruling monarch, King Huai of Chu, through several of this works, most notably "Li Sao" and "Longing for Beauty".

=== Imperial China ===
Confucianism does not recognize homosexual marriage, but does not explicitly criminalize it either. Confucian values may support rejecting homosexuality in the sense of considering man and wife necessary in familial relations. Together with distinct gender roles, this can make Confucian society intolerant of homosexuality. But it does not strictly prohibit homosexuality, and allows or tolerates it if it does not interfere with familial relations or having children. Not all Confucian countries are intolerant of homosexuality.

Taoism and later Buddhism are not known to have been homophobic. Indic philosophy preferred celibacy to procreation, as opposed to both western and Sinic philosophy which championed procreation and marriage.

==== Han dynasty ====
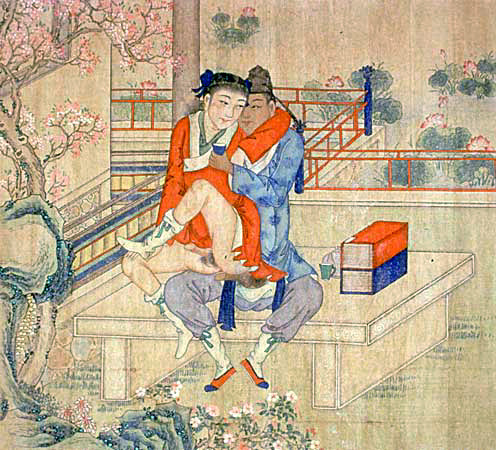
Two young Chinese men drinking tea, reading poems, and having sex. The receptive partner would typically be lighter in skin colour to reflect his "femininity".

Homosexuality and homoeroticism were common and accepted during the Han dynasty. Emperor Ai of Han is one of the most famous Chinese emperors to have engaged in same-sex sexual activity. Historians characterize the relationship between Emperor Ai and his male lover Dong Xian as "the passion of the cut sleeve" (斷袖之癖, duànxiù zhī pì) after a story that one afternoon after falling asleep for a nap on the same bed, Emperor Ai cut off his own sleeve, which Dong Xian was asleep on, rather than disturb him when he had to get out of bed. Dong was noted for his relative simplicity contrasted with the highly ornamented court, and was given progressively higher and higher posts as part of the relationship, eventually becoming the supreme commander of the armed forces by the time of Emperor Ai's death.

It was also during this period that one of the first mentions of female homosexuality surfaced. A historian in the Eastern Han dynasty, Ying Shao, made observations regarding several Imperial Palace women forming homosexual attachments with one another, in a relationship titled duishi (對食, a term interpreted to refer to reciprocal cunnilingus), in which the two acted as a married couple.

==== Liu Song dynasty ====
Writings from the Liu Song dynasty era claim that homosexuality was as common as heterosexuality. It is said that men engaged so often in homosexual activity, that unmarried women became jealous.

==== Tang dynasty ====
During the Tang dynasty era, there were traditions of pederastic same-sex relationships, typically in Buddhist temples, among a young boy and an adult man. Lesbian relationships also commonly occurred in Buddhist nunneries, as many Buddhist nuns sought relationships with one another. Taoist nuns meanwhile were recorded as having exchanged many upon many love poems to one another.

==== Song dynasty ====
The earliest law against homosexual prostitution in China dates from the Zhenghe era of Emperor Zhao Ji in the Song dynasty, punishing nánchāng (男娼), young males who act as prostitutes, with a punishment of 100 blows with heavy bamboo and a fine of 50,000 cash. Another text from the Song dynasty prohibits the offense of bu nan (Chinese: 不男; lit. '[being] not man'; crossdressing).

==== Ming dynasty ====
In addition to having relationships with women, the Zhengde Emperor also had relationships with men. The Tianqi Emperor is believed to have had two private palaces, one for his female lovers and one for his male lovers. During this era, lesbian sexual practices became meeting the rapidly rising trend of "sapphism", which were created all in the name of pleasure. This included, but was not limited to the acts of frottage, cunnilingus and mutual masturbation.

Chinese homosexuals did not experience persecution which would compare to that experienced by homosexuals in Christian Europe during the Middle Ages, and in some areas, particularly among the merchant classes, same-sex love was particularly appreciated. There was a stereotype in the late Ming dynasty that the province of Fujian was the only place where homosexuality was prominent, but Xie Zhaozhe (1567–1624) wrote that "from Jiangnan and Zhejiang to Beijing and Shanxi, there is none that does not know of this fondness." European Jesuit missionaries such as Matteo Ricci took note of what they deemed "unnatural perversions", distressed over its often open and public nature. Historian Timothy Brook writes that abhorrence of sexual norms went both ways, since "the celibate Jesuits were rich food for sexual speculation among the Chinese." Chinese writers typically made fun of these men, insisting that the only reason they condemned homosexuality was because they were forced to refrain from sexual pleasure as they were celibate.

The first statute specifically prohibiting same-sex sexual intercourse was enacted in the Jiajing era of Emperor Zhu Houcong in 1546. Despite this, homosexuality was still commonly accepted and practiced, providing that the men produced heirs and married women later on. Homosexuality was even viewed as "luxurious" by middle classes.

==== Qing dynasty ====
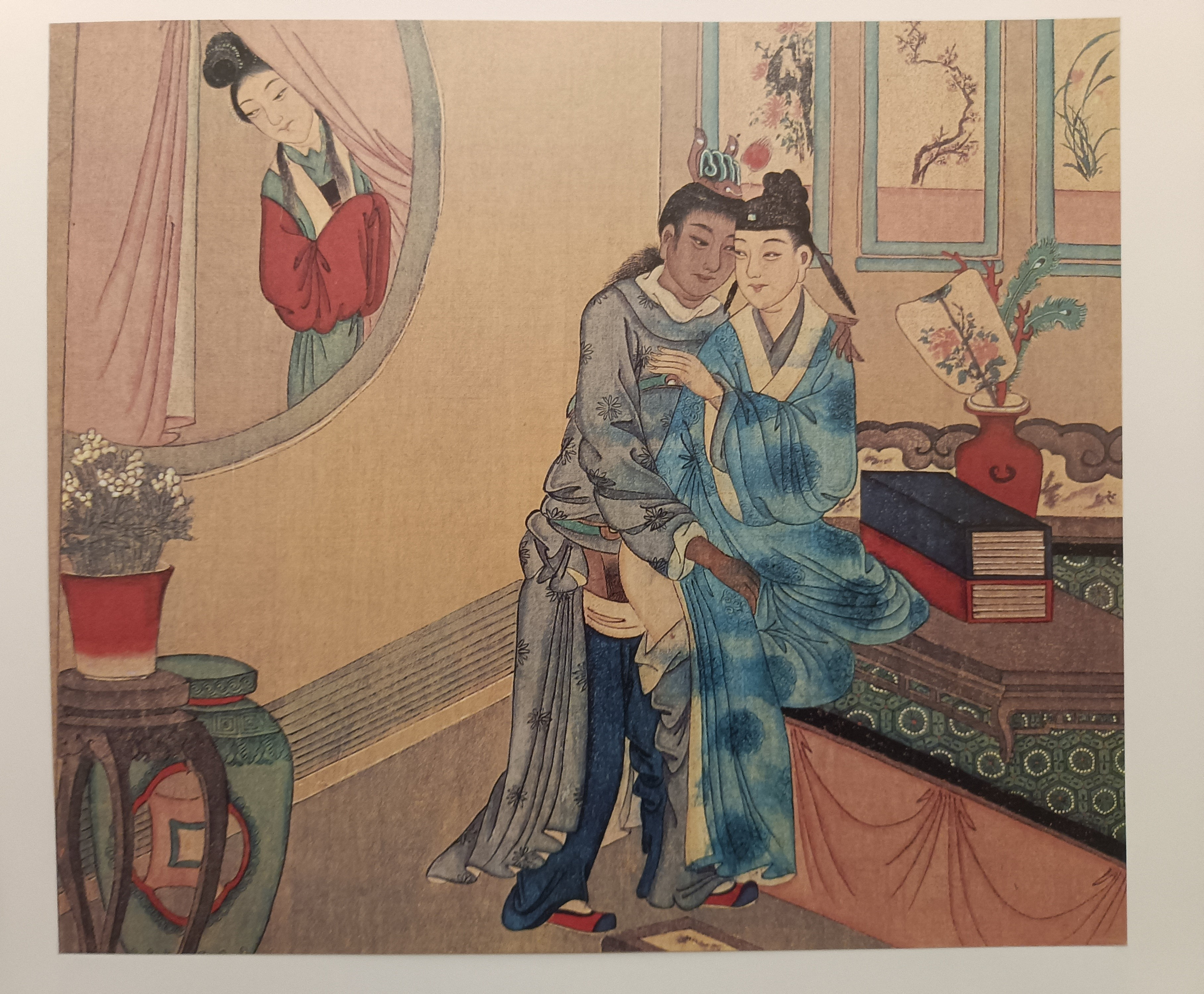
Anal sex between two males being viewed. Painting. Qing-Dynasty. 18th Century

By 1655, Qing courts began to use the term jījiān (雞姦) for homosexual anal intercourse. Society began to emphasise strict obedience to the social order, which referred to a relationship between husband and wife. In 1740, an anti-homosexual decree was promulgated, defining voluntarily homosexual intercourse between adults as illegal. Though there were no records on the effectiveness of this decree, it was the first time homosexuality had been subject to legal proscription in China. The punishment, which included a month in prison and 100 heavy blows with heavy bamboo, was actually the lightest punishment which existed in the Qing legal system.

=== Modern China ===
==== Republic of China ====
In 1912, the Xinhai Revolution toppled the Qing dynasty and its explicit prohibition of ji jian was abolished by the succeeding states.

Heteronormativity and intolerance of gays and lesbians became more mainstream through the Westernization efforts of the early Republic of China.

==== People's Republic of China ====
Homosexuality was largely invisible during the Mao era. During the Cultural Revolution, homosexuals were regarded as "disgraceful" and "undesirable", and heavily persecuted.

- Zhu Zhenhua (Chinese: 朱振华) In 1983, an old photograph shows him being publicly humiliated for the crime of hooliganism and sodomy.
- Zhu Shouqing (Chinese: 朱寿卿) was born in Hanyang, Wuhan. He was first arrested in 1958, and again on 9 December 1977, at the age of 62, when past charges were revisited.

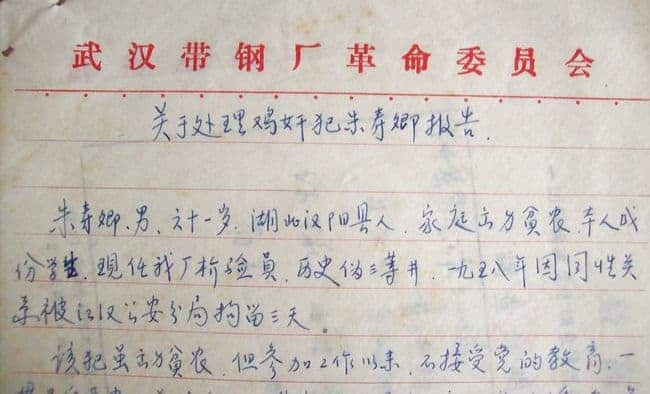
Zhu Shouqing Arrest in 1958

- Chen Baoping (Chinese: 陈保平) In 1962, this 30-year-old man from Xingwen, Sichuan, was convicted of sodomy. He was sentenced to nine years in prison.

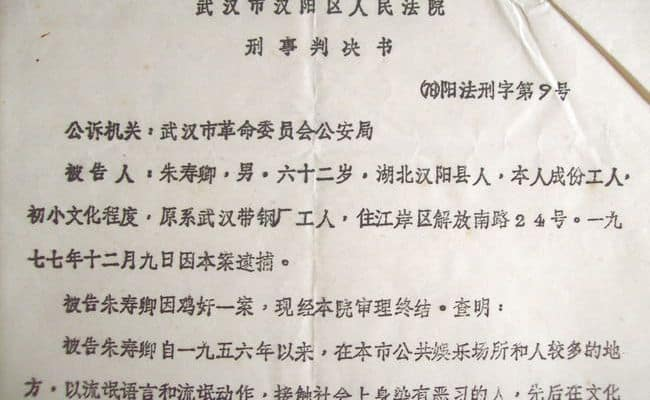
Zhu Shouqing Arrest in 1977

- Ning Guofeng (Chinese: 宁国风) Beijing resident. In 1977, he was subjected to labor reform for hooliganism.

Prior to 1997 revisions to the criminal laws, homosexual acts could be punished under the crime of hooliganism.

The Chinese Society of Psychiatry declassified homosexuality as a mental disorder in 2001 but still claims that a person could be conflicted or suffering from mental problems due to their sexuality. However, such change is yet to be reflected by the regulations of National Health and Family Planning Commission, a government branch that controls all regulations of health care services in China, which has resulted in psychiatric facilities and psychiatry education textbooks across the country still de facto considering homosexuality as a mental disorder and continuing to offer conversion therapy treatments. Transgender identity is still classified as a disorder despite laws allowing legal gender changes. In 2021, a court in Jiangsu upheld a ruling that a description of homosexuality as a mental disorder in a 2013 edition of a university textbook was a result of "perceptual differences", rather than factual error. According to the South China Morning Post, the textbook is used by a number of Chinese universities.

In July 2021, a number of LGBT accounts run by university students on WeChat were deleted, with messages saying that the accounts "had violated regulations on the management of accounts offering public information service on the Chinese internet". A 2016 UNDP survey indicated that less than five percent of LGBT people are fully out at school, work, or in their religious community, while about fifteen percent are out to their families. Under the general secretaryship of Xi Jinping, LGBT rights activists have been subject to increased scrutiny by the country's system of mass surveillance. Authors of boys' love works have been arrested and criminally prosecuted.

== Recognition of same-sex relationships ==
The Marriage Law of the People's Republic of China (Chinese: 中华人民共和国婚姻法, pinyin: Zhōnghuá Rénmín Gònghéguó Hūnyīn Fǎ), adopted at the third session of the Fifth National People's Congress on 10 September 1980, defines marriage as a union between a man and a woman.

On 5 January 2016, a court in Changsha, southern Hunan Province, agreed to hear a lawsuit filed in December 2015 against the Bureau of Civil Affairs of Furong District. This was the first case to litigate gay marriage rights in mainland China. The lawsuit was filed by 26-year-old Sun Wenlin, who in June 2015 had been refused permission by the bureau to marry his 36-year-old partner, Hu Mingliang. On 13 April 2016, with hundreds of same-sex marriage supporters outside, the Changsha court ruled against Sun, who said he would appeal. On 17 May 2016, Sun and Hu were married in a private ceremony in Changsha, expressing their intention to organize another 99 same-sex weddings across the country in order to normalize same-sex marriage in China.

In October 2017, the National People's Congress amended Chinese law so that "all adults of full capacity are given the liberty of appointing their own guardians by mutual agreement." The system, called "legal guardianship" or "guardianship agreement" (Chinese: 意定监护, pinyin: yìdìng jiānhù, Mandarin pronunciation: [îtîŋ tɕjέnxû]), allows any adult with full capacity for civil conduct to designate a guardian. It permits the designated guardian to make important decisions about medical and personal care, death and funeral, property management, and maintenance of rights and interests when the adult becomes incapacitated. Some same-sex couples utilize this system to obtain limited legal protections, as same-sex unions aren't officially recognized; however, many face obstacles, including outright refusal or the imposition of discriminatory requirements by local notary offices. Some notary offices impose requirements like both partners being out to their families. A 2021 report by the China Notary Association states that employees of some notary offices "have been disciplined by authorities for providing voluntary guardianship services to same-sex couples". Some notary offices, when faced with the first same-sex applications, often exhibited extreme caution and uncertainty. In one case in Hunan Province, the local notary office held a six-hour meeting to decide whether to accept the application, with the discussion focusing on whether approval would "disrupt public disorder or morality". In another case in Guangzhou, a notary office allegedly demanded that the same-sex couple submit a 100,000 yuan deposit, a requirement not imposed on heterosexual applicants, leading the couple to abandon their application. Some notary offices only grant guardianship for property matters but not healthcare, while some offices refuse applications from same-sex couples altogether.

On 12 April 2021, the Shenyang Intermediate People's Court in Liaoning province ruled that a 79-year-old woman could not sue her female partner of 50 years, whom she accused of stealing 294,000 yuan from her bank account, because their relationship is not recognized as a marriage in China.

=== Beijing ===
Beijing currently provides dependent residency status to the same-sex partners of legal residents, such as expats.

=== Hong Kong ===
Hong Kong does not recognise same-sex marriages or civil unions. However, same-sex couples are afforded limited legal rights as a result of several court decisions, including the right to apply for a spousal visa, spousal benefits for the partners of government employees, and guardianship rights and joint custody of children.

== Adoption and parenting ==
The Chinese Government requires parents adopting children from China to be in heterosexual marriages. Adoption of Chinese children by foreign same-sex couples and homosexual individuals is prohibited by the Chinese authorities.

== Discrimination protections ==
Chinese law does not explicitly include provisions protecting against discrimination based on sexual orientation or gender identity. Labour law protects workers against discrimination on the basis of a person's ethnicity, gender or religion. However, the law does not contain provisions addressing discrimination based on sexual orientation or gender identity.

In November 2018 and March 2019, China accepted several recommendations pertaining to LGBT rights during its Universal Periodic Review. The "landmark" recommendations, from Argentina, Chile, France, Ireland, Mexico, the Netherlands and Sweden, urge China to pass an anti-discrimination law covering sexual orientation and enact anti-violence and social security measures. In March 2019, it was revealed at the UN that China aims to adopt an LGBT anti-discrimination law within a year. Activists described the recommendations as a "milestone".

In May 2023, a Chinese delegate stated during a session of the United Nations Committee on the Elimination of Discrimination against Women:

Constitution and laws of China do not discriminate against LGBTI. They are viewed as normal people and there's no special accommodation for them. The system of one husband and one wife is also provided by Chinese law. This is the basis of China's marriage system, and is also in line with the current national situation and China's tradition.

In May 2026, the Supreme People's Court responded to a petition regarding anti-LGBTQ discrimination, stating that courts may rule that public insults, defamation, and discriminatory conduct targeting sexual orientation, gender identity, and gender expression constitute an infringement of personality rights, and that employers who treat employees differently in hiring, employment, transfer, or dismissal based on those characteristics could encounter charges of employment discrimination. However, this response does not carry the same legal weight as judicial interpretations or court rulings.

In 2016, Qiu Bai sent a letter to the Ministry of Education of the People's Republic of China, hoping that it would take measures in order to stop the use of homophobic teaching materials in colleges and universities, this letter was received by the Ministry in February 2016. However, no official reply has been received from the Ministry. On 25 April 2016, Qiubai sued the Ministry of Education for inaction based on the relevant provisions of the Chinese Administrative Litigation Law, but the court refused to file the case. In May, she decided to file an administrative reconsideration with the Ministry of Education, which was not accepted. On 14 June, she sued the Ministry of Education before the court, and the case was successfully filed. On 27 September, the Court issued a decision by ruling that Qiubai's right as a lesbian is "an unspecific rights that all student or member of the gay community enjoy". Thus her allegation that her specific rights was hindered was not founded. She then decided to file an appeal. The hearing for the second instance at the Beijing Municipal High People's Court was scheduled for 10 January 2017. Qiubai's attorney Yu Liying stated that she provided new evidence and a more detailed explanation of the infringement suffered by Qiubai, but the Ministry of Education did not recognize the relevance of the evidence with the case. On 2 March 2017, the High Court of Beijing made a final judgment, announcing that Qiubai lost the case and rejected her appeal based on the similar ground as the first instance. Thus, she has not managed to win any of her cases among the five litigations she was involved in before the court. During her legal fight, she was constantly under the pressure from the university administration. This final judgement means that for a long time to come, in the various textbooks used by Chinese university students, homosexuality may continue to be described as "disease", "mental disorder" and "abnormality".

In 2018, a gay kindergarten teacher from Qingdao sued his former school after he was dismissed from his job, following a social media post he had made about attending an LGBT event. The kindergarten was sentenced by the Laoshan District People's Court to compensate the teacher for six months of payable wages. It filed an appeal in December of the same year.

=== Hong Kong ===
The Hong Kong Bill of Rights Ordinance 1991 was utilized to strike down discrimination in the age of consent in the case of Leung TC William Roy v. Secretary for Justice (2005). However this does not protect against governmental discrimination in services and goods.

=== Macau ===
Article 25 of the Basic Law of Macau indicates the people of Macau are free from discrimination based on a non-exhaustive list of prohibited factors. Sexual orientation is not included in said list of prohibited discrimination grounds. However, there are anti-discrimination protections based on sexual orientation in the fields of labour relations (article 6/2 of the Law No. 7/2008), (Note: Chinese: 勞動關係法, Cantonese romanization: Lòuhduhng Gwāanhaih Faat; Portuguese: Lei das relações de trabalho.) protection of personal data (article 7/1,2 of Law No. 8/2005), (Note: Chinese: 個人資料保護法, Cantonese romanization: Goyàhn Jīlíu Bóuwuh Faat; Portuguese: Lei da Protecção de Dados Pessoais) and ombudsman (article 31-A of Law No. 4/2012). (Note: Chinese: 修改第10/2000號法律《澳門特別行政區廉政公署》, Cantonese romanization: Sāugói Daih 10/2000 Houh Faatleuht《Oumùhn Dahkbiht Hàhngjingkēui Lìhmjing Gūngchyúh》; Portuguese: Alteração à Lei n.° 10/2000 «Comissariado contra a Corrupção da Região Administrativa Especial de Macau»)

== Transgender rights ==
In China, gender reassignment on official identification documents, such as the Resident Identity Card and Hukou, is permitted only after certain gender-affirming surgery procedures. As of 2022, following a policy revision by the National Health Commission, full gender-affirming surgery is no longer required to change one's gender marker. However, the removal of sexual and reproductive organs (such as orchiectomy or hysterectomy) remains necessary for the change.

Additionally, the eligibility criteria for sex reassignment surgery have been relaxed. Previous requirements, such as undergoing at least one year of mental health intervention and providing a notarized declaration, have been eliminated. Now, a signature from the individual seeking surgery is required, replacing the notarized document. Non-pathological diagnoses such as gender incongruence and gender dysphoria are now accepted as valid grounds for gender reassignment. The minimum age for undergoing sex reassignment surgery has been lowered to 18, down from the previous age of 20. Some criteria still remain, including the requirements of being unmarried, having notified direct family members, and having a persistent desire for gender reassignment for at least five years, without relapses or interruptions. Meanwhile, discrimination towards transgender people from wider society is common.

As of September 2019, the Chinese Classification of Mental Disorders still classified transgender identity as a mental disorder.

In 2014, Shanxi Province started allowing minors to apply for the change with the additional information of their guardian's identification card. This shift in policy allows post-surgery marriages to be recognized as heterosexual and therefore legal. In 2020, a court in Beijing said that a transgender woman was covered by anti-discrimination protections pertaining to sex, and her employer was obligated to treat her as female, because she had legally transitioned. In 2021, China's first clinic for transgender children and adolescents was set up at the Children's Hospital of Fudan University in Shanghai to safely and healthily manage transgender minors' transition. The 2022 'Chinese expert consensus on multidisciplinary treatment of gender identity disorder' recommends puberty blockers as a treatment for transgender youth. As of 2025, there are 7 medical centers that provide treatment to transgender youth and 3 of those offer puberty suppression as a treatment option.

According to a survey conducted by Peking University, Chinese trans female students face strong discrimination in many areas of education. Sex segregation is found everywhere in Chinese schools and universities: student enrollment (for some special schools, universities and majors), appearance standards (hairstyles and uniforms included), private spaces (bathrooms, toilets and dormitories included), physical examinations, military trainings, conscription, PE classes and exams and physical health tests. Chinese students are required to attend all the activities according to their legal gender marker. It is also difficult to change the gender information of educational attainments and academic degrees in China, even after sex reassignment surgery, which results in discrimination against well-educated trans women.

Gender-affirming treatment in China is limited due to a conservative social environment and non-supportive families. As a result, many individuals, particularly trans women, previously resorted to purchasing hormone medication online. In December 2022, Chinese authorities imposed a ban on the online sale of estradiol and androgen blockers, even for individuals with valid prescriptions. This policy change requires patients to purchase these medications in person, with a valid prescription, further complicating access to gender-affirming treatment for many in the trans community.

=== Hong Kong ===
Hong Kong law allows change in legal documents such as the identity cards and passports after a person has undergone sex reassignment surgery, but does not allow birth certificates to be changed.

== Intersex rights ==
Intersex rights are very limited in China. Issues include both the lack of access to health care for intersex people and coercive genital surgeries for intersex children.

Globally, intersex medical interventions have increasingly been seen as a human rights violation due to their unnecessary nature and the potential for lifelong complications. In a court case decided by the regional court of Cologne in February 2008, German intersex woman Christiane Völling successfully sued the surgeon who had performed a sex reassignment surgery on her in 1977 when she was 18, removing her female reproductive organs without fully disclosing her medical records beforehand. Völling was awarded €100,000 as a result.

== Censorship of LGBT activism and content ==
=== Online censorship ===
The Chinese government has continued to suppress LGBT organizations online in recent years and label LGBT advocacy as a product of "foreign forces." The Great Firewall blocks over 311,000 domains, and frequently takes down social media accounts and posts. The government is most likely to censor online content that criticizes the party or risks mass mobilization, and recently they have sought to limit the expansion of online communities. Governmental advisories highlighted that "vulnerable groups" (ruoshi qunti) pose a security threat as they might be used by the West to infiltrate China.

In July 2021, the WeChat accounts of the several LGBT associations from Chinese universities were closed. The accounts that were closed include some of the most important and influential university associations including Purple from Tsinghua University, Colorsworld from Peking University, Zhihe from Fudan University, and Rainbow of Jin from 19 universities in Tianjin including Nankai University and Tianjin University. Tencent, WeChat's parent company, declined to comment on the account closures. Ned Price, the US State Department spokesperson expressed that the accounts were "merely expressing their views, exercising their right to freedom of expression and freedom of speech".

In April 2018, Sina Weibo, one of the most popular social media platforms in China, banned discussion of LGBT issues. This quickly drew criticism from the public at large and the People's Daily, the Chinese Communist Party (CCP)'s official newspaper. Forms of criticism included the hashtag #IamGay, which was viewed over 240 million times. Sina Weibo reversed its ban shortly thereafter. Many Chinese interpreted the People's Daily editorial as a signal that the government may soften its attitude towards LGBT rights. However, a campaign marking the International Day Against Homophobia on school campuses was forbidden by public officials just one month later.

In 2021, Li Ying became the first openly lesbian Chinese athlete, posting on her Sina Weibo account, a photo of herself and partner. The post garnered resounding support from the internet audience however it was also the subject of significant homophobic abuse. The photo was deleted without explanation. Later in 2021, Sun Wenjing, a Chinese professional volleyball player also announced via social media that she was a lesbian by posting wedding photos of herself and her partner. On 11 May 2021, LGBT Rights Advocacy China announced the end of its activities and the closure of its WeChat and Weibo accounts. "We are deeply regretful to tell everyone, Queer Advocacy Online will stop all of our work indefinitely," said the group. The popular advocacy group had largely focused on campaigning for legal rights such as anti-discrimination laws in the workplace and same-sex marriage. LGBT Rights Advocacy China did not provide any reasons behind the decision to halt their work.

In February 2022, the gay dating app Grindr was removed from app stores in China as part of a month-long campaign to eradicate illegal and sensitive content in the run-up to the Beijing Winter Olympics and Lunar New Year. The Chinese government does allow for the existence of various gay dating applications in China, such as Blued, one of the most important gay dating applications in China. However, in August 2022, BlueCity, which controls Blued's operations, was delisted from the US-based Nasdaq stock exchange. In addition, its CEO and chairman, Ma Baoli, resigned without naming a successor, leaving the app's future uncertain. In November 2025, the Cyberspace Administration of China ordered Apple Inc. to remove two gay dating apps from its app store.

=== Media censorship ===
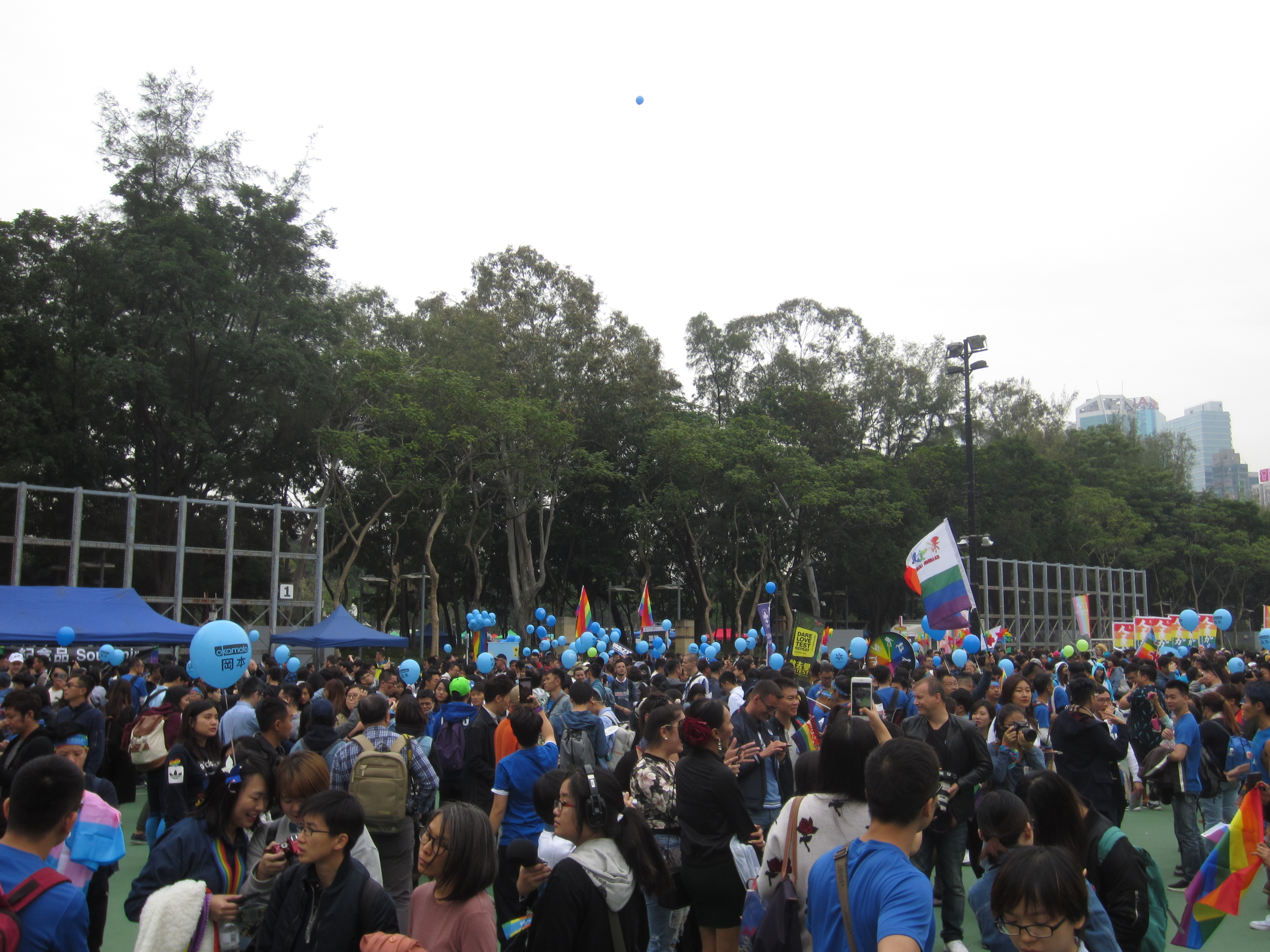
The Hong Kong Pride Parade has been held annually since 2008.

In 2015, film-maker Fan Popo sued government censors for pulling his gay documentary Mama Rainbow from online sites. The lawsuit concluded in December 2015 with a finding by the Beijing No.1 Intermediate People's Court that the State Administration of Press, Publication, Radio, Film and Television (SAPPRFT) had not requested that hosting sites pull the documentary. Despite this ruling, which Fan felt was a victory because it effectively limited state involvement, "the film is still unavailable to see online on Chinese hosting sites."

On 31 December 2015, the China Television Drama Production Industry Association posted new guidelines, including a ban on showing LGBT relationships on television. The regulations stated: "No television drama shall show abnormal sexual relationships and behaviours, such as incest, same-sex relationships, sexual perversion, sexual assault, sexual abuse, sexual violence, and so on." These new regulations have begun to affect web dramas, which have historically had fewer restrictions:

Chinese Web dramas are commonly deemed as enjoying looser censorship compared with content on TV and the silver screen. They often feature more sexual, violent and other content that is deemed by traditional broadcasters to fall in the no-no area.

In February 2016, the popular Chinese gay web series Addicted (Heroin) was banned from being broadcast online 12 episodes into a 15-episode season. Makers of the series uploaded the remaining episodes on YouTube instead. In May 2018, the European Broadcasting Union blocked Mango TV, one of China's most watched channels, from airing the final of the Eurovision Song Contest 2018 after it edited out Irish singer Ryan O'Shaughnessy's performance, which depicted two male dancers, and blacked out rainbow flags during Switzerland's performance. Days before the International Day Against Homophobia in 2018, two women wearing rainbow badges were attacked and beaten by security guards in Beijing. The security company dismissed the three guards involved shortly thereafter.

Mr Gay China, a beauty pageant, was held in 2016 without incident. In 2018, the event host passively cancelled their engagement by not responding to any communications. Mr Gay World 2019 announced cancellation after communication began to deteriorate in early August. No official censorship notice was issued but some articles blamed the Chinese Government for the cancellation. That same year, a woman who wrote a gay-themed novel was sentenced to 10 years and 6 months in prison for "breaking obscenity laws". Amid increasing criticism of China's tightening of censorship under the rule of Chinese leader Xi Jinping, the Beijing International Film Festival attracted controversy when in 2018, China's government censors banned the festival from screening the Oscar-winning Call Me by Your Name, throwing a spotlight on LGBT rights in China.

In February 2022, the first season of the series Friends returned to major streaming media in mainland China, but all the same-sex marriage and love plots were deleted, including dialogues that mentioned lesbian people and scenes of same-sex kissing. However, Sohu Video, which was authorised to rebroadcast Friends from 2012 to 2018, retained the same-sex marriage plot at the time. The deletion drew widespread criticism, and the related hashtag was immediately banned by Sina Weibo. China-made TV series were also victims of censorship towards same-sex plots. Addiction, a 15-episode show about a romance between two high school boys, was pulled offline by China's regulators. It was the series with the second-highest views on iQiyi at the time it was taken down. The guidelines from the government in 2016 lay out an array of subjects that would be prohibited, including depictions of gay relationships.

In 2025, the Chinese version of the film Together was digitally altered to make a same-sex couple a heterosexual one, which was negatively received by viewers in China, who criticized the change as being disrespectful to the LGBTQ community. The Guardian stated the negative reception was due to a rise in support towards the LGBTQ community among Chinese people: a 2024 survey found that more than half of Chinese citizens believed they should be accepted in society. In 2026, the Beijing Queer Film Festival was cancelled after harassment by the Beijing Municipal Public Security Bureau.

=== Other forms of censorship ===
In 2017, an LGBT conference was scheduled to be held in Xi'an. Western reports, using the organizers blog as their source, claimed the police had detained the organizers and threatened them.

In 2020, Shanghai Pride Festival, one of the most important gay rights festivals founded in 2009, were forced to cancel their activities. The announcement posted on their website read, "ShanghaiPRIDE regrets to announce that we are cancelling all upcoming activities". The organisation expressed solidarity with their community and encouraged them to remain "proud", without specifying reasons for the cancellations. Subsequently, ShanghaiPRIDE has not resumed its celebrations. Limited online events remain accessible through their website.

In 2021, PFLAG China (Parents, Families, and Friends of Lesbians and Gays) changed its name to "Trueself", and the goal of the association altered as well: it now connects the work with the governmental statement by claiming that they focus on "make tens of thousands of families an important basis for national development, national progress, and social harmony". In 2024, one of the country's last remaining lesbian bars, the Roxie in Shanghai, was forced to close.

== Academic insights into LGBT activism ==
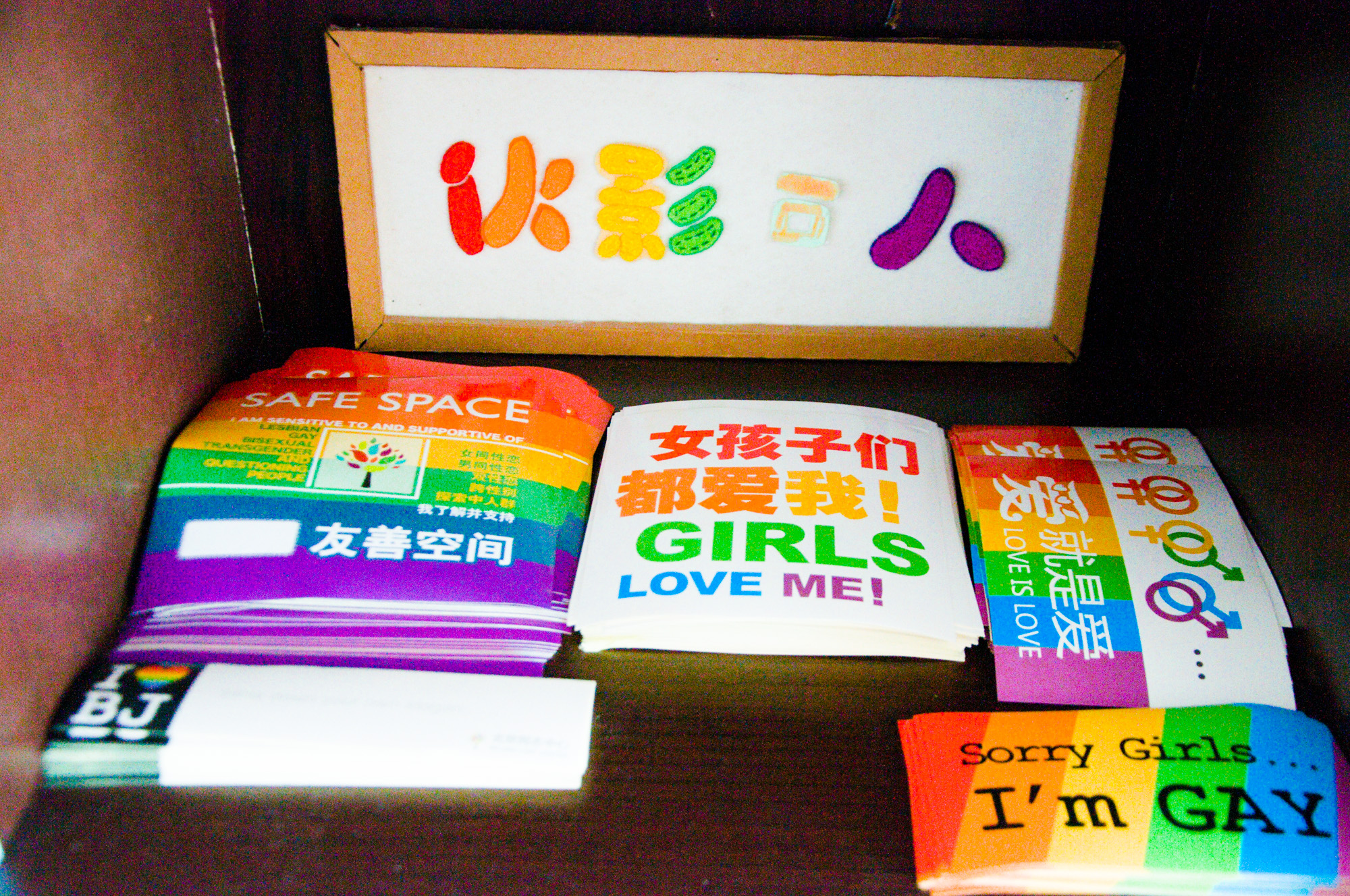
Merchandise at the Beijing LGBT Center, 2014

Po-Han Lee, a scholar at the University of Sussex, claims that the regulation of LGBT activism in Asia has increased in recent years as governments attempt to dissociate with the "individualistic" West. He argues that there has been an "awakening of cultural nationalism and the re-emergence of sexual conservatism", fuelled by post-colonial trauma. Tamara Loos, a professor at Cornell University, adds that Western colonization had a significant impact on the economies, politics, and cultures of both colonized and non-colonized areas of Asia. According to Loos, the legacy of Western imperialism has imposed moral norms that have led to the stigmatization of LGBT people and the internalization of shame across Asia.

Scholars in queer studies argue that the history of colonialism has led to a "desexualization" of LGBT activism in Asia, where activist groups adopt a more "respectable" or "pragmatic" approach. This means they often align with heteronormative standards to gain visibility and acceptance in society. This differs from Western LGBT activism, which has traditionally been more vocal and demanding in its fight for rights. Some researchers question whether this "pragmatic" activism is effective or if it simply reinforces heteronormative practices.

However, some scholars find fault with this conclusion, explaining that it relies on Western-centric scholarship and methodologies. They claim that current analyses of LGBT activism in Asia do not capture the complexity of queer experiences and activism in a post-colonial context. Dr Shana Yi, a professor at the University of Toronto, explains that queer studies in Asia must be "decolonized" and scholars must recognize the "heterogeneity and plurality of global coloniality". Baden Offord, Professor of Cultural Studies and Human Rights at Curtin University, argues that this can be achieved by adopting a "counter-hegemonic" approach to queer studies since it historically links Western modernization and "globalization as the source of sexual modernity". Thus, it must be acknowledged that LGBT movements are "characterized by their geo-political context, history, social, religious and economic conditions", and so LGBT activism in China cannot be studied using a Western framework.

As for the reason for the lack of LGBT acceptance, Confucian philosophy and a collectivist cultural mindset have long shaped conservative views on sexuality and gender roles in China. These traditions prioritize family, filial piety, and societal harmony over individual expression, making the acceptance of LGBT identities difficult. As one study by Dr. Hongjie Liu notes, "Influenced by a collectivist culture, Chinese people tend to subordinate personal interests to those of the group or collective."

Under CCP general secretary Xi Jinping, the space for LGBT advocacy has become more restricted as the government has tightened control over civil society. These measures target organizations and movements seen as potential risks to traditional values and social harmony, particularly those receiving foreign funding, including some LGBT groups. These groups are sometimes viewed as promoting ideas that differ from traditional norms and values.

Sociologist Cui Le argues that institutional homophobia in China is deeply rooted in the legal, educational, and social systems, creating an environment where LGBT people face discrimination and marginalization. While recent political shifts have exacerbated these issues, the underlying prejudices have long been present in Chinese society. The Chinese government decriminalized homosexuality in 1997 and in 2013 they accepted the United Nations' recommendations to introduce anti-discrimination legislation for LGBT people. This included assurances of more equal treatment alongside protections from workplace discrimination based on sexual preference and gender identity. Critics argue that China's acceptance of UN policy on LGBT rights is a foreign policy manoeuvre to appease the international community.

Strategic motivations for the crackdown have also been cited by academics and prominent journalists. Sue Lin-Wong, the Economist's former China correspondent has stated that Xi Jinping's political ideology was strongly influenced by the dissolution of the Soviet Union and the events of the Arab Spring. She argues that he saw the power of mass mobilization and the threat of social movements to autocratic regimes. By limiting the organizational power of grassroots activist groups, Xi Jinping limits the likelihood of mass revolution and calls for wider democratic reform.

Scholars also argue that mass mobilization is likely to face suppression when demonstrations are large, organized, formal, political, and carried out by minority groups, as they are seen to be more disruptive to social stability. In this context, LGBT organizations are viewed as a threat in China since their demonstrations are often politically charged, large, and associated with "foreign" concepts. Echoing this idea, LGBT activists claim that during governmental interrogations, there is an emphasis placed on the threat that community organization poses to national security, rather than its immorality. Another way in which LGBT activism has been limited in China is through self-censorship, which has led to "pragmatic" activism. Scholars cite that this is partly strategically driven by the government's crackdown and partly driven by internalized shame.

Scholars explain that the Chinese government directly controls the nature of LGBT activism in China through strict government regulation of civil sector organizations. In general, the government requires Non-Governmental Organizations' (NGOs) compatibility with China's overall policy goals. Therefore, LGBT activist groups tend to work on issues that are non-politically charged and serve the wider community, such as HIV and AIDS prevention, to receive the most funding and "political space". In turn, organizations that adopt overtly political stances or mobilize the LGBT community are less likely to survive in China.

== Conversion therapy ==
In December 2014, a Beijing court ruled in favor of Yang Teng, a gay man, in a case against a conversion therapy clinic. The court ruled against the clinic, as the treatments failed to deliver the clinic's promise in its advertisements, and ordered the clinic to pay monetary compensation to Yang, as well as take down their advertisements on conversion therapy treatments. In June 2016, Yu Hu, a gay man from Henan Province, sued a hospital in the city of Zhumadian for forcing him to undergo conversion therapy. He was awarded a public apology and monetary compensation in July 2017. However, the court did not rule the practice as illegal in its decision. Following these two successful rulings, LGBT groups are now calling on the Chinese Health Ministry to ban conversion therapy. However, as of December 2019, no effective measures have been taken by the Chinese Government to ban conversion therapy, and such treatments are being actively promoted across China.

== Public opinion and demographics ==
According to certain estimates from 2010, about 80% to 90% of Chinese gay men were married to women. Such women are known as tongqi in Chinese (Chinese: 同妻, pinyin: tóngqī). In 2012, a professor at Sichuan University committed suicide after learning that her husband was gay. A 2016 survey from the Beijing LGBT Center found 5% of those who identified as LGBT had come out to everyone in their lives. A September–October 2016 survey by the Varkey Foundation found that 54% of 18–21-year-olds supported same-sex marriage in China.

Opinion polls have shown growing levels of support for LGBT rights and same-sex marriage in China. A 2009 poll found that 30% of Beijing's population supported same-sex marriage, while a 2014 poll found that 74% of Hong Kong residents favoured granting certain rights and benefits to same-sex couples. A 2017 University of Hong Kong poll found that 50.4% of Hong Kong residents supported same-sex marriage, and nearly 70% supported a law protecting LGBT people from discrimination. A May 2021 Ipsos poll showed that 43% of Chinese people supported same-sex marriage, 20% supported civil partnerships but not marriage, while 19% were opposed to all legal recognition for same-sex couples, and 18% were undecided. A poll in July 2024 by the William Institute found that 52% of Chinese agreed that same-sex couples should be able to marry. In recent years, Chinese public attitudes towards the LGBTQ+ community continue to become increasingly favorable and more tolerant.

== Summary table ==
Same-sex sexual activity legal	Yes (Since 1997)
Equal age of consent (14)	Yes
Freedom of expression	No (gay themes in media — including social media — are censored) Since 2022, LGBT-themed publications as targets for crackdown and removal
Anti-discrimination laws in employment	No Not covered, one exemption of the Chinese Government allowing transgender protection has been noted but otherwise LGBT are not protected
Anti-discrimination laws in education	No
Anti-discrimination laws in the provision of goods and services	No
Anti-discrimination laws in all other areas (incl. indirect discrimination, hate speech)	No
Same-sex marriage(s)	No
Recognition of same-sex couples	Yes / No (Similar but inequal "guardianship" status is legal and in use by same-sex couples)
Stepchild adoption by same-sex couples	No
Joint adoption by same-sex couples	No
Lesbian, gay and bisexual allowed to serve in the military	No / Yes (Service allowed, unclear if being openly gay is)
Transgender people allowed to serve in the military	No (Physical health requirements effectively bar transgender people who have undergone or are undergoing medical transition from serving)
Right to change legal gender	Yes (Requires undergoing SRS, which requires a year of psychotherapy, among other criteria)
Right to change the gender information of educational attainments and academic degrees	No / Yes (Difficult and no legal procedure, which has caused discrimination against well-educated trans women.）
Third gender option	No
Intersex minors legally protected from early medical interventions	No (See Intersex rights in China)
Conversion therapy banned by law	No (Still in practice — with some legal precedent against forced conversion therapy)
Access to IVF for lesbian couples	(Legally requires a marriage certificate in public hospitals — may be de facto accessible in private hospitals)
Automatic parenthood for both spouses after birth	No
Commercial surrogacy for gay male couples	No (Banned regardless of gender and sexual orientation)
Homosexuality declassified as a mental illness	Yes (Chinese Society of Psychiatry declassified it in 2001, however, teaching material classifying homosexuality as a psychological disorder can still be legally used)
Transgender identity declassified as a mental illness	No (Still classified as such, as of September 2019)
MSM allowed to donate blood	No (As of 2012)

== See also ==
- Human rights in China
- LGBT rights in Asia
- LGBT rights in Hong Kong
- LGBT rights in Macau
- Recognition of same-sex unions in China
- Homosexuality in China
- LGBT history in China
- Transgender people in China
- Intersex rights in China
