= Transgender people in China =

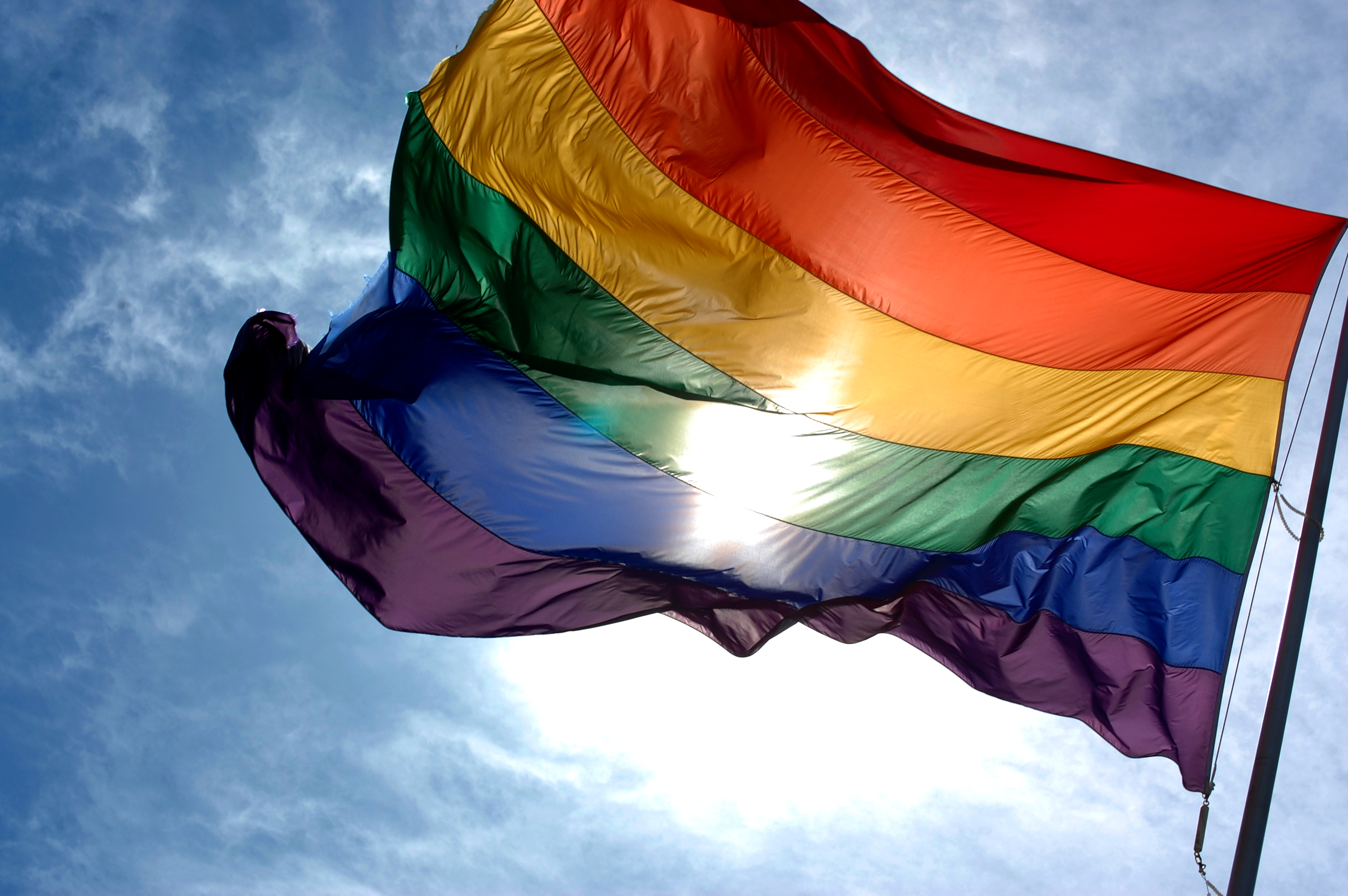
The rainbow flag, commonly the gay pride flag and sometimes the LGBTQ pride flag, is a symbol of lesbian, gay, bisexual, and transgender (LGBTQ) pride and LGBTQ movements in use since the 1970s.

Transgender people in the People's Republic of China include persons whose gender identity differs from their sex assigned at birth. They face a legal and social environment in which medical transition and changes to legal sex are permitted under restrictive conditions. Reliable estimates of the transgender population are limited, but transgender people have become more visible in Chinese medicine, media, and public life since the late twentieth century. While there have been advances in transgender rights in recent years, violence and discrimination remain alongside widespread censorship (Note: In recent years, China has seen an intensified crackdown on independent LGBT activism. The Beijing LGBT Center was forced to close in 2023, citing "forces beyond our control". ShanghaiPride events have been suspended since 2020, and activist WeChat groups are frequently deplatformed.) and barriers to healthcare. There are about four million transgender people in China.

Changes to the legal gender marker are possible, but it requires gender-affirming surgery. Transgender identity is still classified as a mental disorder despite changes to the ICD-11. Access to hormones and surgery is available but restricted; some resort to informal or unregulated treatment. Specialist services have expanded, including clinics for transgender youth, despite government promotion of "traditional gender roles".

Transgender people in China may face discrimination in employment and housing as well as violence. Like all transgender people, they are at a higher risk for depression and anxiety relative to the broad population. Furthermore, they may face difficulties reauthenticating prior academic records as well as family pressure and parental involvement in healthcare.

== History ==
In the mid-1930s, after the father of Yao Jinping (姚錦屏) went missing during the war with Japan, the 19-year-old reported having lost all feminine traits and become a man, was said to have an Adam's apple and flattened breasts, and left to find him. Du He, who wrote an account of the event, insisted Yao had become a man, while doctors asserted Yao was female. The story was widely reported in the press, and Yao has been compared to Lili Elbe, who underwent sex reassignment in the same decade.

According to some scholars, female infants were dressed up as males ("cross-dressing"). They claim that this, in turn, affected those children to live transgender lives.

=== Cross-dressing in Peking Opera ===
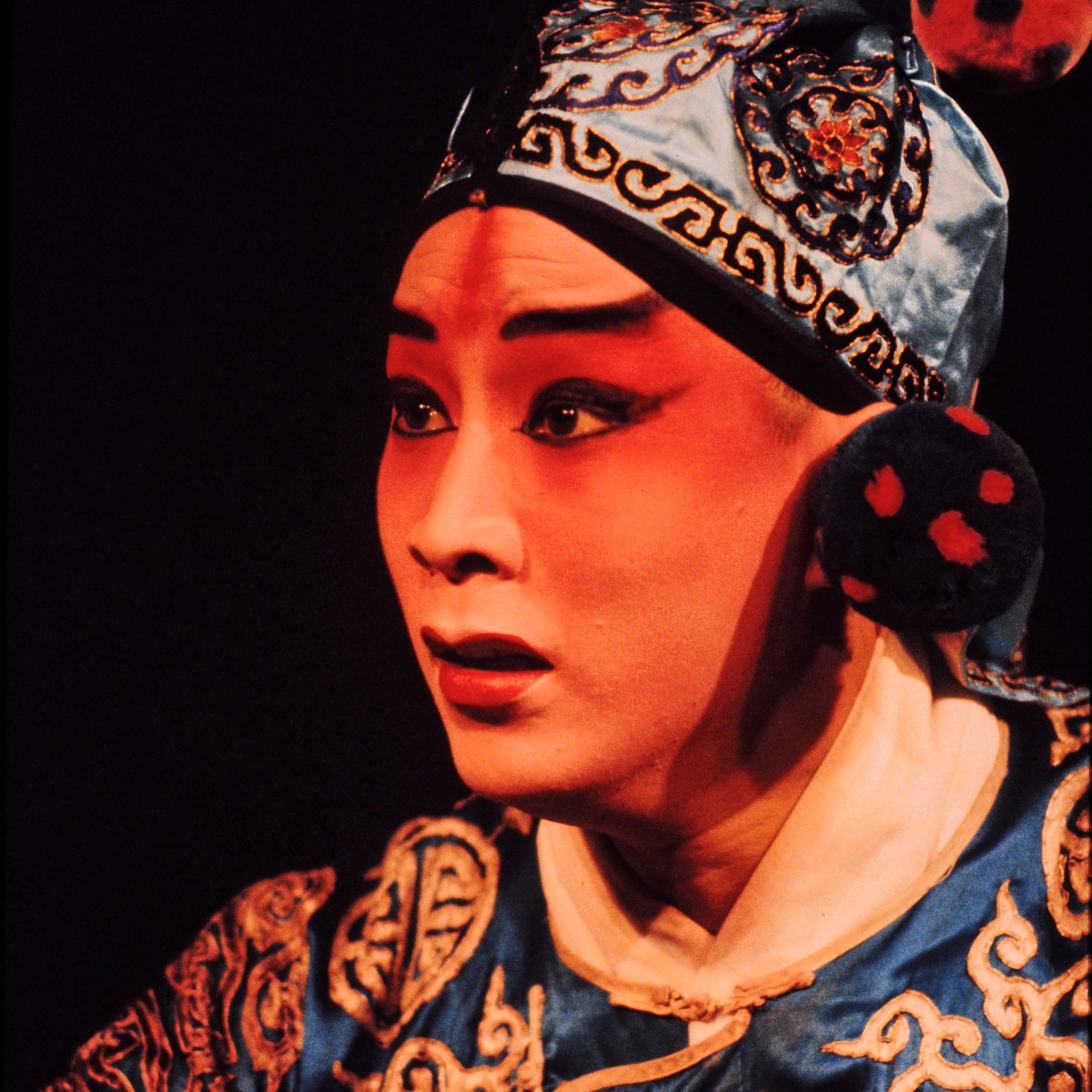
A Beijing Opera or Peking Opera performer.

Sinologists often look to theatrical arts when imaging China in a transgender frame because of the prominent presence of cross-gender behavior.

Peking Opera, also known as Beijing Opera, had male actors playing female dan characters. Men traditionally played women's roles due to women being excluded from performing in front of the public as a means of preventing carnal relations. Although, before 1978, male to female cross dressing was mostly for theatrical performances, used for comedic effect or to disguise a character in order to commit a crime or defeat enemies. Female to male characters were considered heroic in theatrical performances.

During the Ming and Qing Dynasties of China, cross dressing occurred both onstage and in everyday life. Within theater, some who were intrigued by it would roleplay, organize their own troupes, write, and perform theatrical pieces.

Many of early modern China's stories reflected cross-dressing and living the life of a different gender for a short period of time, mainly featuring the cross-dressers as virtuous, like Mulan.

Li Yu, a writer and entrepreneur, featured the gendering of bodies to be dependent upon men's desires and operated by a system of gender dimorphism, as assumed by social boundaries of the time. When Li Yu created an acting troupe, as many elite males did, he had a concubine who played a male role as he believed she was "suited to male" or considered her more of the masculine gender.

In modern-day Peking Opera and film, there are male to female cross dressers and vice versa for characters, especially with certain time periods.

== Legal and medical aspects ==
China has signed and ratified the International Covenant on Economic, Social and Cultural Rights. It has signed but not ratified the International Covenant on Civil and Political Rights.

After the World Health Organization dropped "gender identity disorder" from its International Classification of Diseases (ICD-11) in 2018, China promoted the new guidelines in medical institutions across the country.

China's CCMD-3 psychiatric classification (published 2001) lists "gender identity disorder" (Chinese: 性身份障碍) and "transsexualism" (Chinese: 易性症; lit. 'gender-change condition') under psychological disorders. Previously, "transsexualism" was written as 易性病 lit. 'gender-change disease'.

In March 2019, China accepted recommendations by the United Nations Human Rights Council on banning discrimination against LGBTQ people.

In 2020, a Beijing court ruled in favour of a transgender woman who was unlawfully dismissed by e-commerce company Dangdang despite having submitted a medical certificate and having followed doctor's advice. The court said that Dangdang should "continue to honour her original contract of employment" and that the company should "pay her salary from the date she applied for sick leave to the date of arbitration", amounting to 128,028 yuan. The ruling was based on Articles 4, 48, and 87 of the Labour Contract Law. Furthermore, the court stated that "social tolerance is a blessing of the rule of law" and called for the protection of the dignity of transgender people.

On October 31, 2024, a Chinese transgender woman was approved by Changli county people's court in Qinhuangdao to receive 60,000 yuan (£6,552) in compensation from a hospital that gave her electroshock conversion treatment against her will. This was the first time any transgender person in China won a legal challenge against the use of electroshock conversion treatment.

In 2025, China voted against a motion to renew the mandate of the United Nations Independent Expert on Sexual Orientation and Gender Identity at the United Nations Human Rights Council.

=== Gender reassignment ===
Gender reassignment surgery has been permitted in mainland China since 1983. The same year, the first male-to-female surgery was performed in the country. Medical regulations for such procedures were first standardised in 2009. The three main rounds of regulations were published in 2009, 2017, and 2022, respectively.

In early 2014, the Shanxi province started allowing minors to apply for the change with the additional information of their guardian's identification card. This shift in policy allows post-surgery marriages to be recognized as heterosexual and therefore legal.

==== 2009 Regulations: Technical Management Standards for Sex Reassignment Surgery (Trial) ====
The first round of regulations concerning gender reassignment surgery were issued in 2009. The official terminology used was "sex change surgery" (Chinese: 变性手术).

Requirements for the patient include:

- At least 20 years old, unmarried, with full civil capacity; (Note: Changed to 18 in 2022.)
- At least 5 years of desire for transition, without reversal;
- At least 1 year of prior psychiatric treatment without success; (Note: Removed in 2022)
- "Transsexualism" diagnosis from a psychiatrist with no other abnormal mental state;
- Sexual orientation directed at the opposite of their target gender; (Note: Removed in 2017 and unchanged since then)
- No surgical contraindications;
- No criminal record;
- Notarised written request from patient; proof of notification to immediate family; ethics approval; informed consent (Note: Notarisation no longer required since 2022)

==== 2017 Regulations: Gender Reassignment Technology Management Standards (2017 Edition) ====
The official terminology used was "gender reassignment technology" (Chinese: 性别重置技术). Most notably, the sexual orientation requirement was removed.

Requirements for the patient include:

- At least 20 years old, unmarried, with full civil capacity;
- At least 5 years of desire for transition, without reversal;
- At least 1 year of prior psychiatric treatment without success;
- "Transsexualism" diagnosis (Chinese: 易性病) from a psychiatrist;
- No surgical contraindications;
- No criminal record;
- Notarised written request from patient; proof of notification to immediate family; ethics approval; informed consent

==== Latest 2022 Regulations: Management Specification for the Clinical Application of Gender Reassignment Technology (2022 Edition) ====
Requirements were further relaxed with this revision. As of July 2026, this revision is still in force.

Requirements for the patient include:

- At least 18 years old, unmarried, with full civil capacity;
- At least 5 years of desire for transition, without reversal;
- Diagnosis of either "transsexualism" (Chinese: 易性症), "gender dysphoria" (Chinese: 性别焦虑), or "gender incongruence" (Chinese: 性别不一致) from a tertiary hospital; (Note: "Transsexualism" is the old term; "gender incongruence" is used by ICD-11; "gender dysphoria" is used by DSM-5.)
- No surgical contraindications;
- No criminal record;
- Signed written request from patient; proof of notification to immediate family; ethics approval; informed consent

Under these new regulations, "transsexualism" was no longer described using the noun for "disease" (Chinese: 病) but was instead replaced using the noun for "condition" (Chinese: 症).

=== Change of legal gender marker ===
Gender reassignment surgery is a prerequisite for legal gender recognition; China does not allow gender self-identification. Changing the gender marker on official identification documents (Resident Identity Card and Hukou) requires the following:

- A formal written request from the applicant;
- Household Registration Book (which may need to be retrieved from the applicant's family) and Resident Identity Card;
- A certificate of gender authentication issued by a domestic tertiary hospital, along with verification of the certificate from a notary public office or judicial accreditation body.

Since 2022, according to new regulations of the National Health and Family Planning Commission, changing the legal gender marker no longer requires a full-sequence gender reassignment surgery; only the removal of reproductive and gonadal organs (testes, penis, breasts, ovaries) is required.

For Chinese nationals of Hong Kong and/or Macau holding the Home Return Permit (MTP), the MTP's identity particulars are subordinate to the person's officially registered Hong Kong/Macau identity particulars. Such persons seeking to change their legal gender marker in the mainland must do so for their Hong Kong Identity Card or Macau Identity Card, after which they can have their MTP replaced.

On 6 February 2023, Hong Kong's Court of Final Appeal decided Tse Henry Edward v Commissioner of Registration. Old rules required transgender persons to undergo "full sex reassignment surgery" before changing the sex marker on their HKID. The Court unanimously found that the full SRS requirement was unconstitutional, pursuant to the right of privacy under Article 14 of the Hong Kong Bill of Rights. The Court required the Government to introduce a new policy, which it did on 3 April 2024. Under the new policy, full SRS is no longer required (for MtF, only removal of the penis and testes are needed; for FtM, bilateral mastectomy is required).

Macau is the only jurisdiction within China that does not allow transgender persons to change their legal gender marker.

Changing one's ID card information may lead to an abnormal match with their academic qualifications, which often seriously impacts one's employment as one cannot change their student status information after graduating from university.

According to Chinese law:

学历注册并提供网上查询后，学校不得变更证书内容及注册信息，不再受理学生信息变更事宜。注册信息确有错误的，须经省级教育行政部门审核确认后方可修改。

[Once an academic qualification has been registered and made available for online verification, the institution may not alter the contents of the certificate or the registration information, and will no longer accept requests to change student information. If the registered information is indeed incorrect, it may be amended only after review and confirmation by the provincial-level education administrative department.]

Multiple reports indicate that it is difficult to change gender information on academic credentials and degree certificates after graduation, with only a few isolated cases claiming success.

=== Gender-affirming hormone therapy (HRT) ===
China has no single national regulation on HRT. Therefore, requirements that exist for gender reassignment surgery are not necessarily present for HRT.

A 2017 survey conducted by Beijing LGBT Center and Peking University found that up to 71% of respondents who sought HRT said they had "difficulty" accessing it. Almost 50% of transgender people who wanted access to HRT reported being unable to obtain it "in any form at any point in their lives".

In November 2021, Bloomberg reported that transgender people seeking hormone treatment or gender-affirming surgery in China were required to notify family, prove they have no criminal record, and receive psychological treatment in order to be allowed a prescription for hormone replacement therapy (HRT). Familial disapproval had led many to seek alternative sources of their medication, including online sources.

In November 2022, Chinese government began preparations to restrict internet purchases of estradiol and cyproterone, and a draft had been reviewed. The ban was put in place in December so that even those with prescriptions cannot buy these drugs online.

== Social support and public opinion ==
Prior to its closure in 2023, The Beijing LGBT Center (Chinese: 北京同志中心) was primarily composed of four organizations: Aizhixing AIDS Organization, Tongyu Lala Organization, Aibai Cultural and Education Center, and Les+. Tongyu Lala was an organization based in Beijing that combatted discrimination against and was an advocate for social inclusion of lesbians, bisexual women, and transgender people. The group also helped organize LGBTQ groups in China.

Events promoting LGBTQ rights and equality in China include or included the International Day Against Homophobia, Biphobia and Transphobia, the Beijing Queer Film Festival, and parades held in Beijing, Guangzhou, Hong Kong, and Shanghai).

A June 2021 report published by the UCLA School of Law based on data collected in the 2017 Global Attitudes Toward Transgender People Survey found the following conclusions:

- A "majority of participants" agreed that they want China to "do more to support and protect transgender people".
- Female and younger participants generally had more positive attitudes.
- Participants who knew a transgender person were more likely to say transgender people "engage in criminal activity".
- 46% of participants reported having seen transgender people, but not knowing them personally.
- 14% reported having transgender acquaintances.
- 74% said transgender people should be protected from discrimination.
- 66% said they should be allowed to have gender-affirming surgery.
- 65% agreed that transgender people should be allowed to have children.

According to a 2021 report done by Beijing LGBT Centre, a third of the 293 respondents who had gone through gender reassignment surgery said they "continued to use the gender they were assigned with at birth", mostly due to workplace and familial pressures.

== Challenges ==
=== Youth ===
Transgender youth in China face many challenges. One study found that Chinese parents report 0.5% (1:200) of their 6 to 12-year children AMAB and 0.6% (1:167) of children AFAB often or always 'state the wish to be the other gender'. 0.8% (1:125) of 18- to 24-year-old university students who were AMAB (whose sex/gender as indicated on their ID card is male) report that the 'sex/gender I feel in my heart' is female, while another 0.4% indicating that their perceived gender was 'other'. Among students AFAB, 2.9% (1:34) indicated they perceived their gender as male, while another 1.3% indicated 'other'.

One transgender man recounts his childhood as one filled with confusion and peer bullying. In school, he was mocked for being a tomboy and was regularly disciplined by teachers for displaying rowdy boy-like behavior. Some recommended that his parents have him institutionalized.

These attitudes may be slowly changing and many Chinese youth are able to live happy and well-adjusted lives as members of the LGBTQ+ community in modern China. In July 2012, the BBC reported that the new open economy has led to more freedom of sexual expression in China.

In 2021, China's first clinic for transgender children and adolescents was set up at the Children's Hospital of Fudan University in Shanghai to safely and healthily manage transgender minors' transition. The opening of the clinic received positive coverage by state media despite recent crackdowns on LGBTQ activists, censorship of LGBTQ accounts, and an emphasis on traditional gender roles, attracting "slight confusion". The 2022 Chinese expert consensus on multidisciplinary treatment of gender identity disorder' recommends puberty blockers as a treatment for transgender youth. As of 2025, there are 7 medical centers that provide treatment to transgender youth and 3 of those offer puberty suppression as a treatment option.

According to a survey conducted by Peking University, Chinese trans female students face strong discrimination in many areas of education. Sex segregation is found everywhere in Chinese schools and universities: student enrollment (for some special schools, universities and majors), appearance standards (hairstyles and uniforms included), private spaces (bathrooms, toilets and dormitories included), physical examinations, military trainings, conscription, PE classes, PE exams and physical health tests. Chinese students are required to attend all the activities according to their legal gender marker. It is also difficult to change the gender information of educational attainments and academic degrees in China, even after sex reassignment surgery, which results in discrimination against well-educated trans women.

=== Workplace discrimination ===
A 2021 survey in Beijing showed that half of the transgender respondents do not express their gender identity at work and 34% said they had experienced workplace discrimination. The unemployment rate in the transgender community is three times higher than China's urban unemployment rate among the general population.

One study, presented by Beijing LGBT Center and the Department of Sociology of Peking University, indicated a self-reported unemployment rate of 11.87% for transgender people versus the general rate of 3.97%.

=== Gender-affirming treatments ===
In 2019, Amnesty International reported that transgender people in China resorted to unregulated use of medication and self-surgery due to inadequate access to information, legal and administrative barriers to gender-affirming surgeries. Many were afraid to come out to their parents. Some purchased hormone drugs through unregulated channels online, overseas, or on the black market. Specialized gender-affirming health care facilities are not common in China, although a multi-disciplinary medical team for gender-affirming treatments, the first of its kind, opened in 2018 at Peking University Third Hospital.

== Transgender culture ==
=== Literature ===
Literature and plays in the 17th century featured cross-dressing, like Ming dramatist Xu Wei who wrote Female Mulan Takes Her Father's Place in the Army and The Female Top Candidate Rejects a Wife and Receives a Husband. Despite the female to male cross dressing, the woman would eventually return to her socially gendered roles of wearing women's clothes and would marry a man.

=== Social media and technology ===
Technological advancements help to promote greater awareness among youth of LGBTQ issues. Access to Western media such as trans-themed websites and the featuring of transgender characters in Western movies are broadening the knowledge and sense of community that many trans youth seek.

=== Transgender people in media ===
Entertainers:

- Jin Xing

Citizens:

- Liu Ting

The following Chinese films portray transgender characters:

- Swordsman II (1992)
- The East is Red (1993)
- Whispers and Moans (2007)
- Splendid Float (2004)
- Drifting Flowers (2008)

In addition, in the 2019 documentary film, The Two Lives of Li Ermao, a trans migrant worker "transitions from male to female, then back to male," which some promoted as part of "Love Queer Cinema Week".

== Summary table ==
Legal and administrative status of transgender persons in mainland China
Issue	Current position	Details
Change of legal sex on household registration and identity documents	Available with conditions	A legal sex marker change is only available after gender-affirming surgery, subject to medical certification and administrative documentation.
Gender-affirming surgery	Legal and regulated	Under the 2022 national regulations, a patient must be at least 18, unmarried, have had a persistent request for gender reassignment for at least five years, and provide a psychiatric or psychological diagnosis, proof of no criminal record, and proof that immediate family members have been informed.
Change of higher education records	Restricted after qualifications are issued	Ministry of Education rules state that, once academic qualifications have been registered and made available for online verification, institutions generally may not alter certificate content or registered information except to correct errors.
Psychiatric classification	Classified as a mental disorder in 2020 national guidance	The National Health Commission's 2020 diagnostic guidance includes "gender identity disorder" in its manual on mental disorders and lists transsexualism, dual-role transvestism and childhood gender identity disorder as subcategories.
Freedom of speech and expression	Limited in practice	The law implies that transgender persons have the right to freedom of speech and expression, (Note: Article 35 of Chapter II of the Constitution of the People's Republic of China states: "Citizens of the People's Republic of China enjoy freedom of speech, publication, assembly, association, procession, and demonstration.") but there exists widespread censorship in practice.
Childbearing and adoption	Allowed, ambiguous	There is no law forbidding transgender people from adopting children. There are cases of transgender persons successfully adopting children.

== See also ==
- Homosexuality in China
- Intersex rights in China
- LGBTQ culture in Shanghai
- Outline of transgender topics
