= BQC =

BQC or bqc may refer to:

- Beijing Queer Chorus, a semiprofessional mixed choir based in Beijing, China
- Bournvita Quiz Contest, an Indian quiz contest sponsored by Cadbury India
- British Quizzing Championships, a quiz competition in the United Kingdom
- bqc, the ISO 639-3 code for Boko language, Benin and Nigeria
