= LGBTQ culture in Beijing =

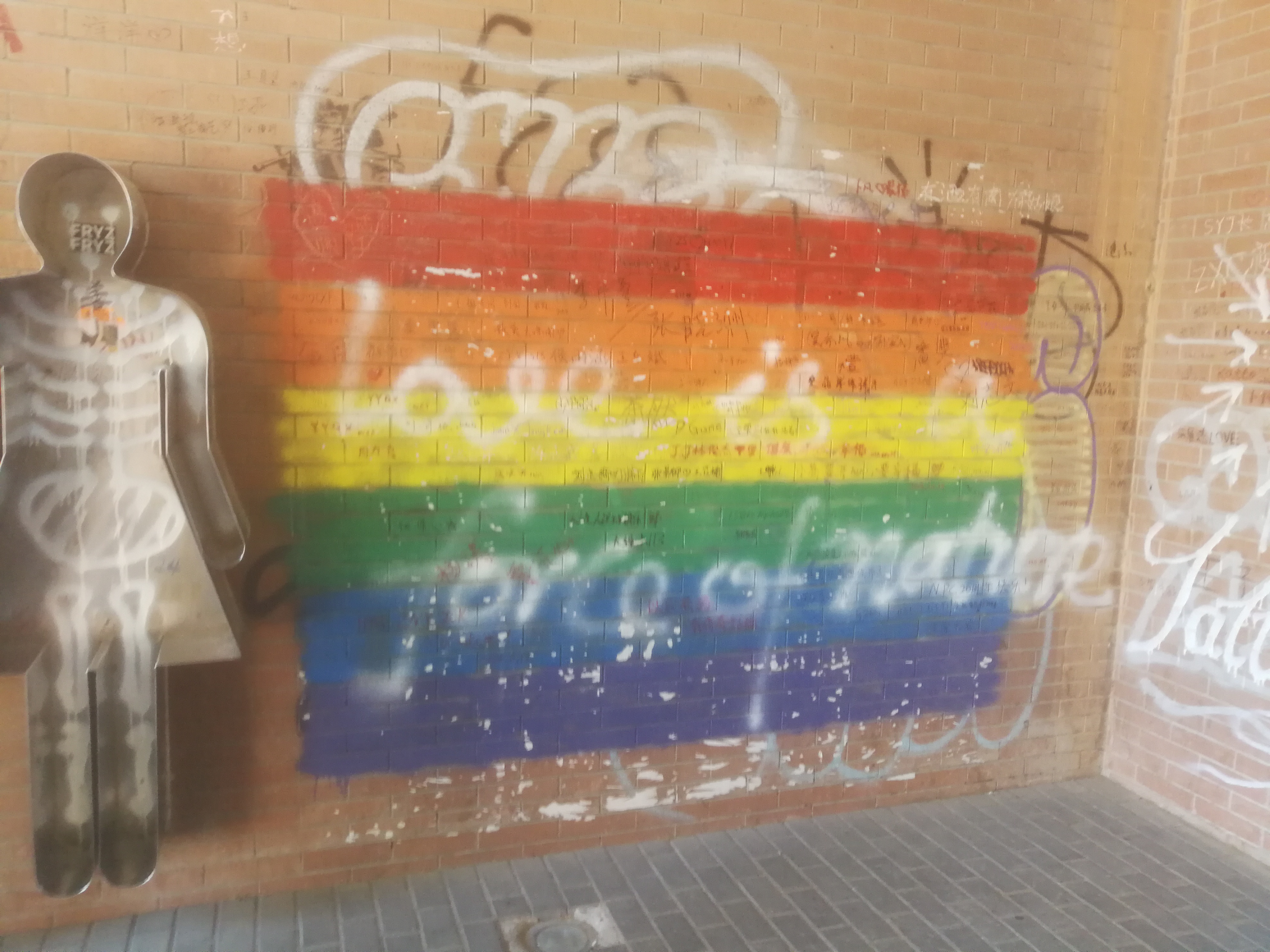
LGBT graffiti in Chaoyang District, Beijing

In 2015, Condé Nast Traveler described Beijing's LGBTQ scene as "under-the-radar yet energized". A 2019 article by The Economist noted that, "for a conservative city, Beijing has a remarkable gay nightlife." However, recent social and ideological suppression by government officials has led to scrutiny, harassment, and cancellation of LGBTQ and feminist events.

== Nightlife ==
In Beijing, gay bars are called "comrade bars" as comrade is Chinese slang for gay. Destination, a four-story gay bar opened in 2004 (three years after China un-classified homosexuality as a mental disorder), has been called the "granddaddy of Beijing's gay clubs." Other gay bars include Adam's, Funky, Kai Bar, Red Dog, and The Rabbit; the cocktail bar Más is considered LGBT-friendly. Chill Bar has a monthly lesbian party, and the Beijing Lesbian Center started a lesbian salon in 2004.

== Art, film, and music ==
The Beijing Queer Chorus is the first public LGBTQ chorus in mainland China. It was established in 2008 as the Shining Jazz Chorus and changed its name to the Beijing Queer Chorus in 2014.

The city hosts the Beijing Queer Film Festival, an independent annual event which was founded in 2001 by Peking University students. In 2026, the festival was cancelled after "a campaign of sustained harassment from authorities" including frequent pressure from police.

== Beijing LGBT Centre ==
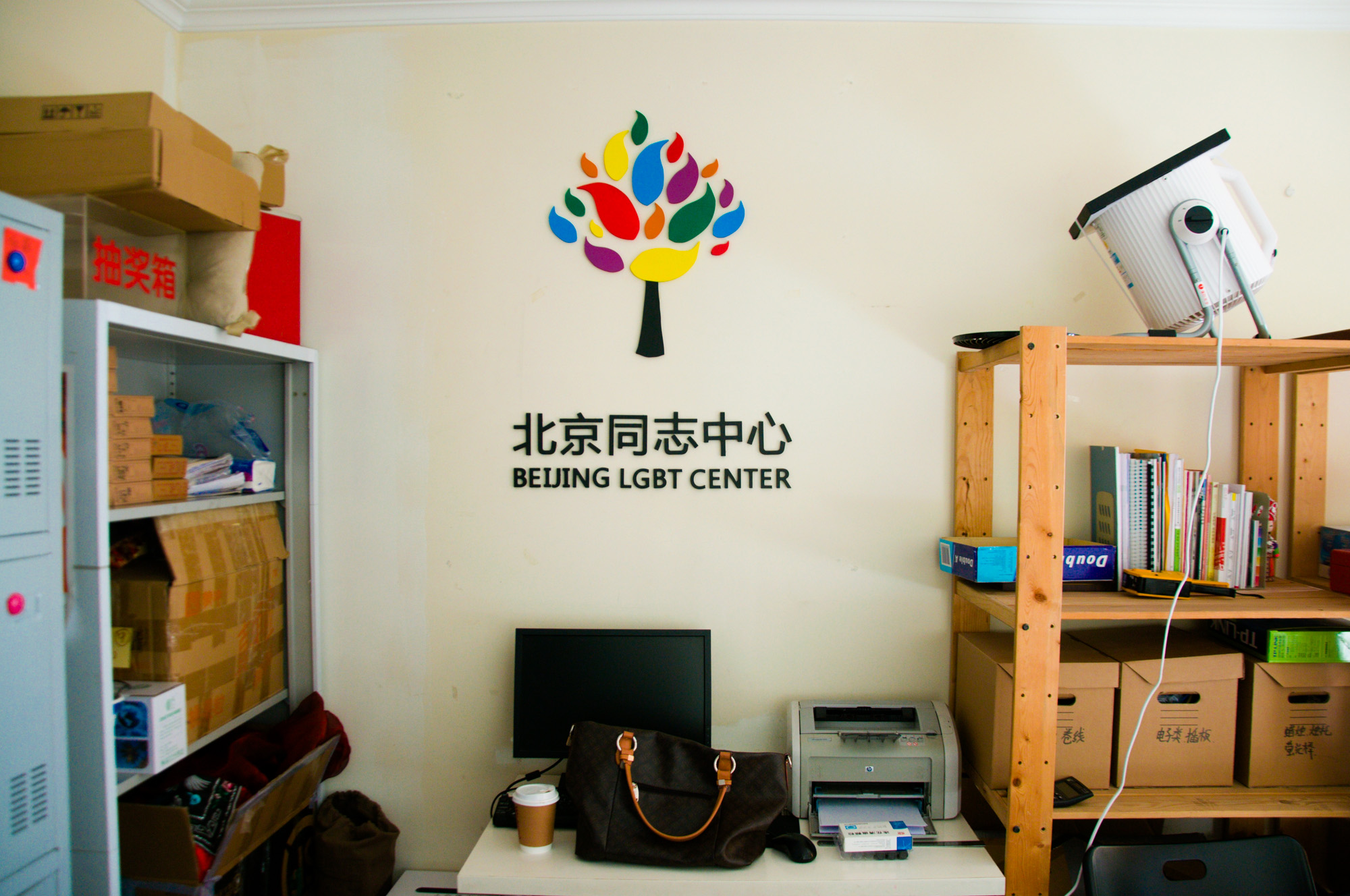
Beijing LGBT Center

Founded in 2008, the Beijing LGBT Centre was a non-profit organization dedicated to partnering with LGBT service organizations in Beijing and providing resources to LGBT people in Beijing. The Centre closed in 2023 following political pressure and funding limitations.

== See also ==
- Homosexuality in China
- Transgender in China
