= Xin Ying =

Executive director of the Beijing LGBT Center

Xin Ying is the former executive director of the now dissolved Beijing LGBT Center. Ying started China's first transgender hotline and played a vital role in arranging mental health services for the LGBTQ community in China.
