= Beijing LGBT Center =

Defunct Chinese LGBT non-profit

- 北京同志中心
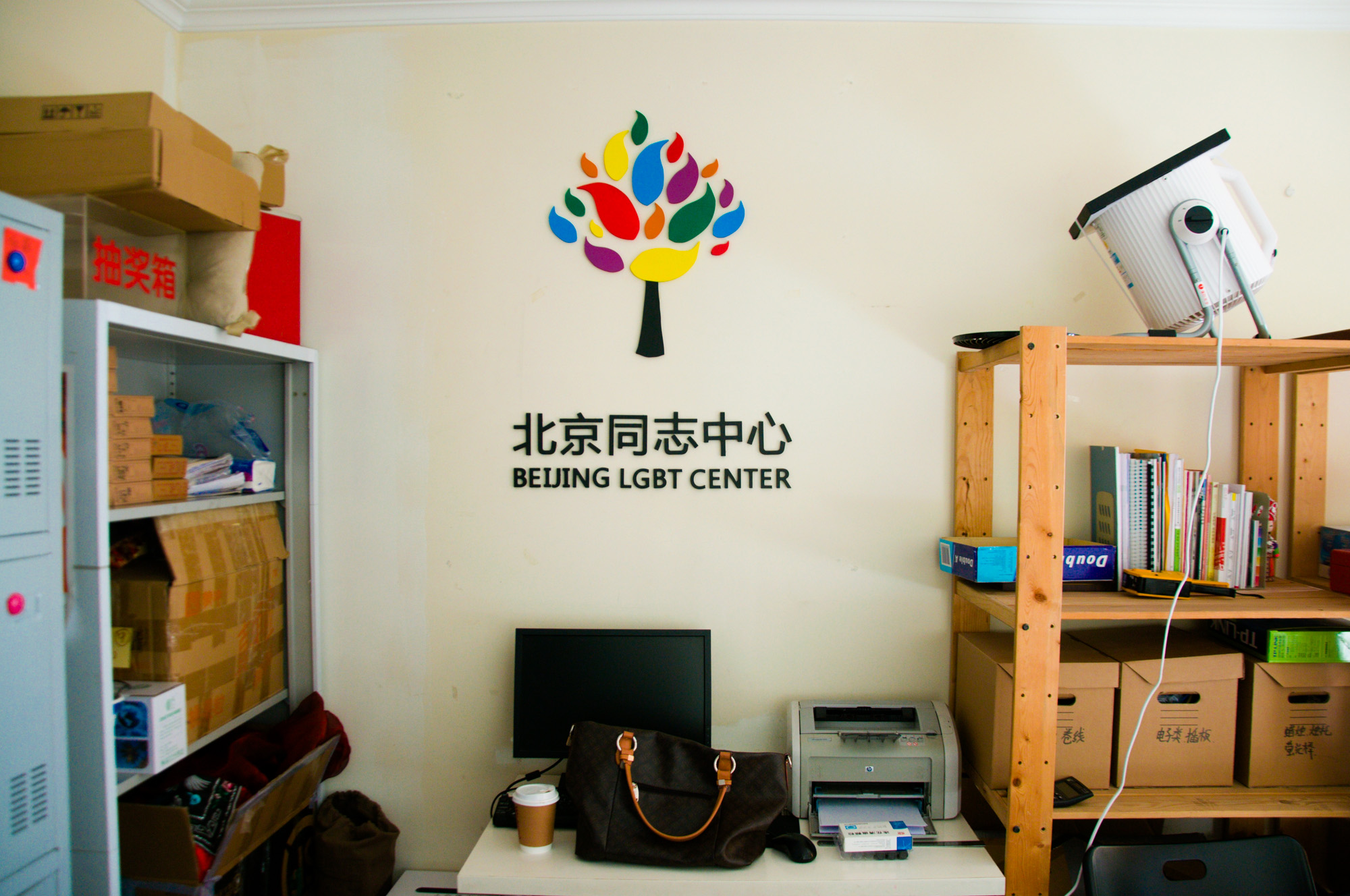
- The offices of the Beijing LGBT Center in 2014
- Formation: February 14, 2008; 18 years ago
- Dissolved: May 15, 2023; 3 years ago
- Purpose: LGBT rights, research, and mental health support
- Headquarters: Beijing, China
- Coordinates: 39°54′21.1″N 116°28′19.6″E
- Services: advocacy, service referrals, crisis hotlines
- Executive director: Xin Ying
- Website: bjlgbtcenter.org.cn

The Beijing LGBT Center (Chinese: 北京同志中心; also known as 北同文化) was a non-profit organization dedicated to improving the living environment for LGBT (Lesbian, Gay, Bisexual and Transgender) people in China. The group was founded in 2008, and until its closure in 2023, provided resources such as low-cost mental health counseling, a directory of LGBTQ-friendly healthcare providers, and a crisis hotline for transgender individuals. In addition to its advocacy work, the center's offices acted as a community meeting space with film screenings and discussion groups.

== History ==
The Beijing LGBT Center was founded in 2008 as a cultural outlet for various LGBT service organizations based in Beijing. In its early days, its primary mission was to organize cultural activities, aiming to address a perceived lack of stability and unity within the local LGBT community. Following the departure of its original sponsors, the center hired new staff and transitioned into an independent organization with a renewed focus on advocating for LGBT rights.

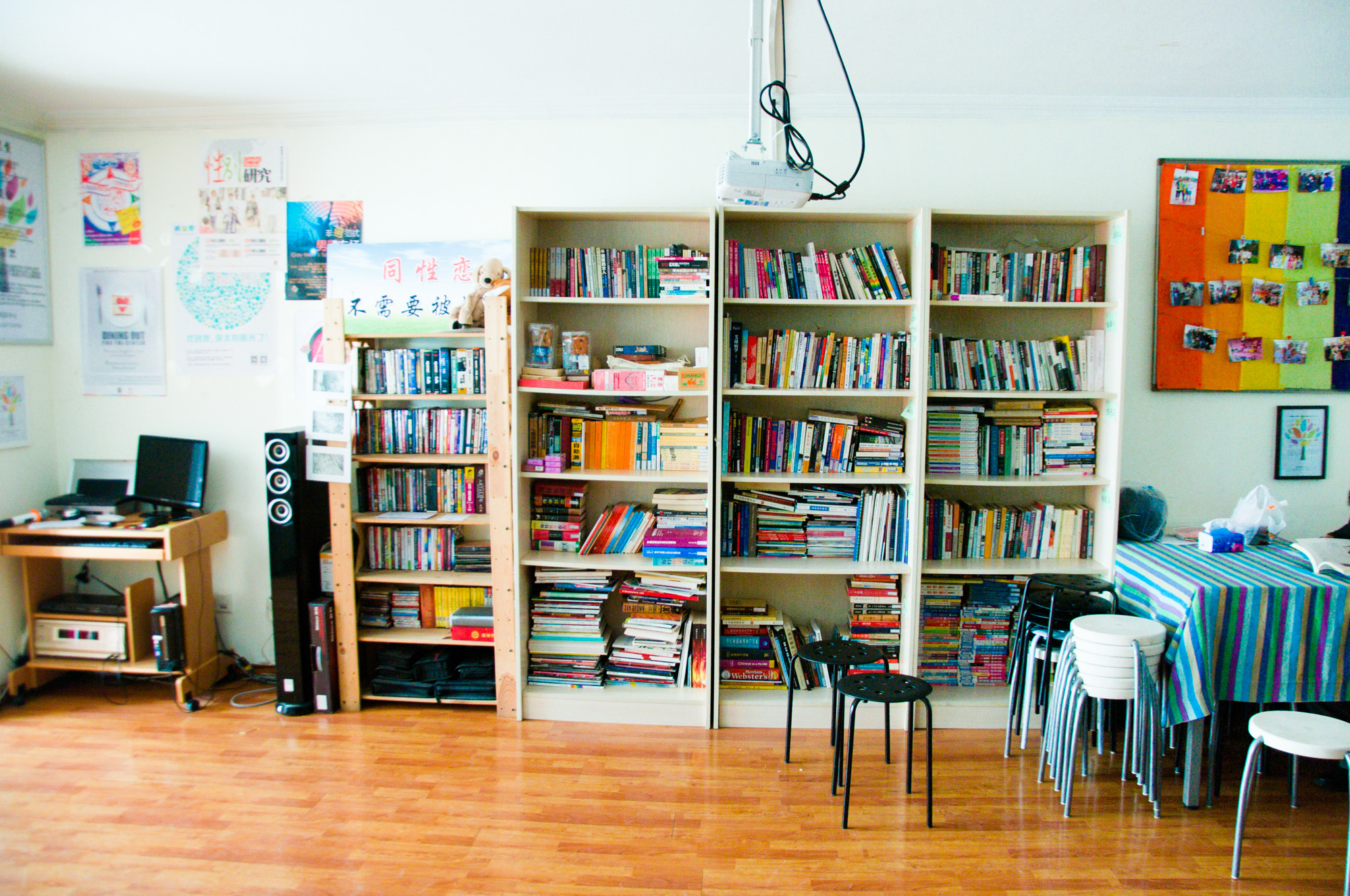
A small library collection at the center, featuring a protest sign from 2014 with the message "homosexuality does not need to be treated" (同性恋不需要被治疗).

One of the center's first advocacy initiatives involved educating psychologists in China about conversion therapy. In 2014, the center helped Yang Teng, a gay man, prepare a case against a clinic in Chongqing that had provided him with conversion therapy that included electroshock therapy. The case was successful, and a local court in Beijing eventually declared conversion therapy for "curing" gay people to be illegal altogether. Still, the practice of conversion therapy persisted in China. Center employee John Shen and others later went undercover for a 2015 episode of Channel 4's Unreported World, revealing that hospitals continued to provide electroconvulsive conversion therapy.

The center's research efforts included the administration of the Chinese Gender and Sexual Minorities Psychological Health Survey and a 2017 survey with Peking University on the mental health of transgender Chinese people. Other forms of activism organized by the center were meant to replace pride parades, which were frequently forbidden by authorities. One example was a protest of Weibo's planned ban on gay content, in which volunteers wearing blindfolds and t-shirts reading "I am gay" stood with their arms out and solicited hugs from passersby. The center also partnered with photographer Teo Butturini to create Humans of New York-style portraits of LGBT individuals living in China.

== Crackdown and closure ==
The Beijing LGBT Center had faced ongoing challenges to stay open, with obstacles arising from both funding limitations and political pressure. LGBTQ groups cannot register as non-governmental organizations in China, making it difficult to obtain government approval for events and secure external funding. To overcome its financial hurdles, the center organized fundraising events at local bars and received direct financial support from the Los Angeles LGBT Center. Amidst a crackdown on organizations with names containing "homosexuality", "association", and "rights", the center changed its official Chinese name to the portmanteau "北同文化" (lit. 'Beijing homo-culture') in 2021. The center also faced pressure from its landlords and was forced to relocate multiple times.

In May 2023, the Beijing LGBT Center announced on its Weibo account that it will be suspending operations after 15 years, citing "forces beyond control" as the only reason. This closure was unexpected and came only a week after the center had published an article commemorating its 15 years of dedicated work. China's gay pride groups and university LGBT spaces have faced similar abrupt shutdowns since 2020.

== See also ==
- Homosexuality in China
- LGBT culture in Beijing
- LGBT rights in China
