= Eddy's Bar =

Defunct gay bar in Shanghai, China

- 艾迪酒吧
- Interactive map of Eddy's Bar
- Location: Shanghai
- Coordinates: 31.20368°N 121.43766°E
- Type: Gay bar

Construction
- Opened: 1995
- Closed: 2016

Eddy's Bar (Chinese: 艾迪酒吧; pinyin: Àidí Jiǔbā) was a gay bar in Shanghai, China. It opened on Weihai Lu in 1995 and moved to Huaihai Lu in 2002, where it operated until its closure in 2016. Eddy's was the first bar to openly serve Shanghai's LGBTQ community.

== Description ==
Lonely Planet offers the following description: "Shànghǎi's longest-running gay bar is a friendly place with a flash, square bar to sit around, as well as a few corners to hide away in. It attracts both locals and expats, but it's mostly for the boys rather than the girls."

== History ==
In 1995, the bar opened at a temporary location on Xingguo Road. Most of the clientele were men, except for the few women who were invited to help conceal the LGBTQ+ nature of the bar.

After opening, the bar changed locations six times due to a variety of factors. Landlords were not a fan of leasing to a gay bar, competition opening up near the bar, etc. In 1997, "hooliganism" was abolished by the Chinese government which loosely covered homosexual activity. In 2001, homosexuality was removed from the Chinese Society of Psychiatry's list of psychiatric disorders. Both of these helped the bar get a little more acceptance from the neighborhood.

In 2004, Eddy's found a permanent location on Huaihai Middle Road where they had less problems with landlords and random inspections.

In 2016, Eddy's was closed for good.

== Reception ==
In 2010, CNN's Robert Schrader described the venue's "red glow [that spilled] out of all the light fixtures, illuminating the Westerners and the Shanghainese who congregate at one of the most welcoming locales in Shanghai". In 2011, Time Out Shanghai called Eddy's a "popular stalwart of Shanghai's gay scene" and the city's "original gay bar".

== See also ==
- LGBTQ culture in Shanghai
