= LGBTQ culture in Shanghai =

The city of Shanghai, China, a global center for finance, technology, manufacturing, and transportation, has a presence of LGBT (lesbian, gay, bisexual, and transgender) people.

Hongwei Bao, author of "Queering/Querying Cosmopolitanism: Queer Spaces in Shanghai," stated that the LGBT community in Shanghai has a more cautious attitude in comparison to LGBT communities in other Chinese cities. Bao wrote that there is a sense that Shanghai has a culture superior to that of other areas in China and that "Shanghai's gay identity bears the imprint of this self-identified cultural superiority brought about by their experience with colonialism and capitalism in the twentieth century."

== History ==
After the Proclamation of the People's Republic of China until the 1970s, homosexuality was suppressed. Cruising areas, including public toilets, river banks, and parks, were used in the 1970s and 1980s. They were known as beats, or dian'er in Chinese. By 2012 wealthier LGBT people began visiting bars, cafes, restaurants, and shopping areas.

The first ever lala (lesbian, female bisexual, and transgender male to female) group in Shanghai is the Shanghai Nvai Lesbian Group.

Bao wrote that there are many LGBT-related non-governmental organizations in Shanghai, and that an employee of one LGBT NGO told him that the NGOs in Shanghai have better relations to one another compared to the LGBT NGOs in other Chinese cities.

In 2020, ShanghaiPride was forced to halt events. In 2024, one of the last remaining lesbian bars in Shanghai and the country, the Roxie, was forced to close.

== Geography ==
In 2009, Aric Chen of The New York Times stated that the "epicenter" of the LGBT community is the "Gay Triangle," three bars in the French Concession. They are: Eddy's Bar (Chinese: 艾迪酒吧; pinyin: Àidí Jiǔbā) and Transit Lounge Shanghai (TL), both of which have closed, and Shanghai Studio. Wealthier and non-Chinese LGBT persons meet in areas in wealthier communities, while working class LGBT persons meet in less wealthy areas such as Hongkou District and Yangpu District.

== Gay establishments ==
Eddy's, Shanghai's first gay bar, opened in 1995 and moved to its current location in 2001. Erdingmu and the other first gay bars also opened in the early 1990s. The number of gay businesses and bars sharply increased by the late 1990s.

=== Lucca Cafe and Lounge ===
Lucca Cafe and Lounge
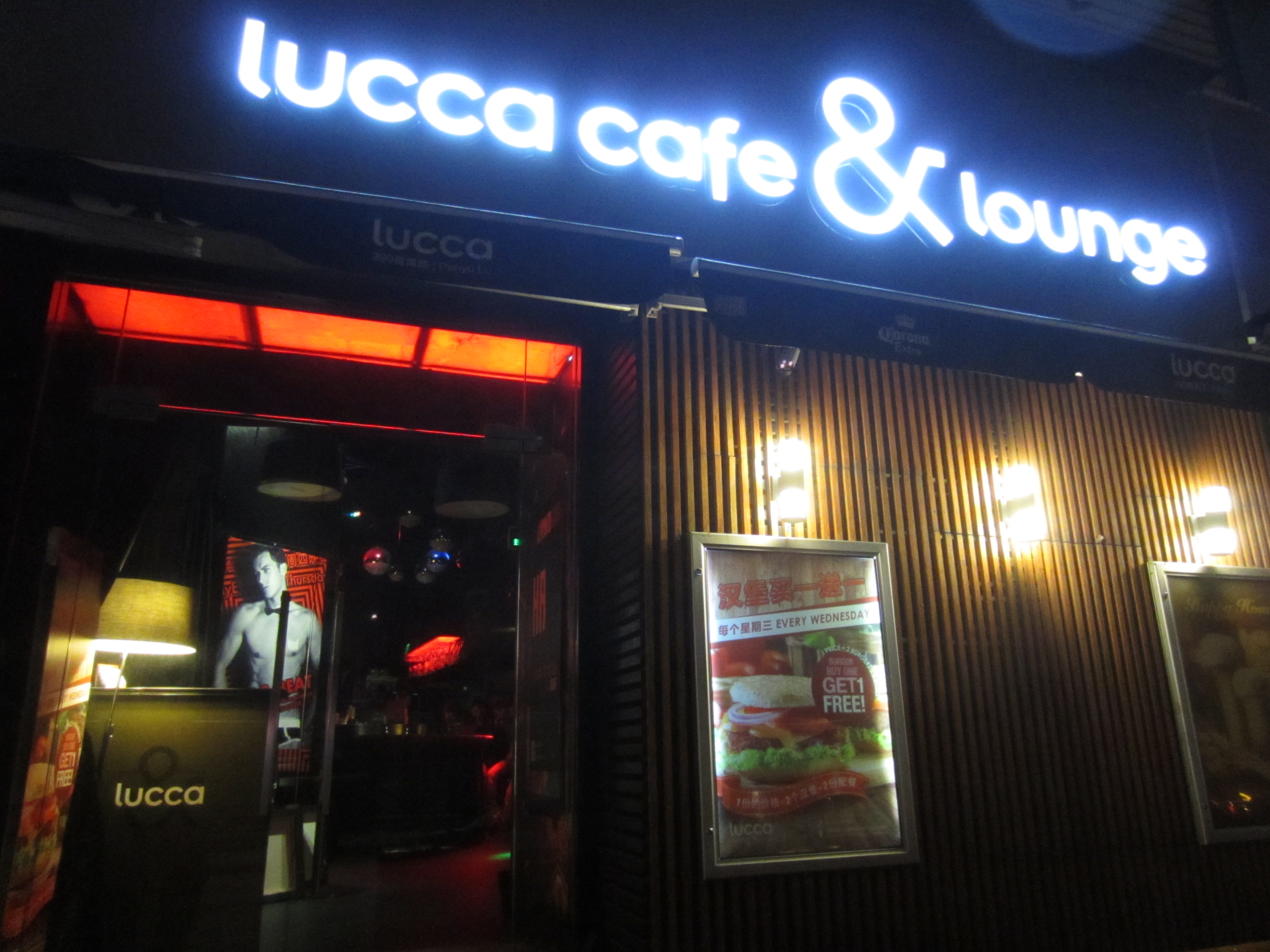
- The bar's exterior in December 2015
- Former names: 390 Bar
- Address: 390 Panyu Road (番禺路390号)
- Location: Shanghai, China
- Type: Gay bar

Lucca Cafe and Lounge (often abridged as Lucca) is a gay bar located at 390 Panyu Road (番禺路390号) in Changning District, Shanghai. It has been described as Shanghai's "most popular" gay bar. It opened in 2015 as a rebranded version of 390 Bar, which closed in December 2014. Ownership did not change during the transition, and Lucca's interior and atmosphere are "strikingly similar" to 390. Time Out Shanghai said Lucca has "chilled, casual weekday vibes, and raucous, drag-tastic disco-dancing Friday and Saturday nights". SmartShanghai described the venue as "somewhere between a dive and a nice spot, with reasonably priced drinks and a decent crowd on Fridays and Saturdays. Not an intense, circuit club vibe. More like chilling, cocktails, some dancing." The bar's menu includes burgers, pastas, and pizzas.

On December 12, 2014, Changning district authorities shut down 390 Bar and escorted the DJs and staff to jail, where they remained for less than 24 hours. The bar opened the next day and continued to operate until December 16, when authorities returned and shut down a comedy event at 9pm. 390's management said, "Basically, until we can figure out what's the current reason for the continued early closing requests, and how we can comply in any way possible to our local police friends, we will remain closed." SmartShanghai's Alastair Sloan, who described 390 as a "(beloved) pansexual live house", called the closure "unfortunate, and, frankly, pretty damn frustrating news for Shanghai nightlife". Time Out Shanghai's John Ovans said of the bar's closure and reopening, "390 wasn't broke so didn't need fixing, so we're pleased it's found its way back onto the map, especially as it dishes out fun like no other gay venue in Shanghai. After all, what would have happened to the Annual Drag Queen competition? It doesn't bear thinking about."

=== ROXIE ===
Roxie Shanghai was a queer women's bar located at 2/F, 359 Kangding Road, near Shaanxi Road (N) (康定路359号2楼, 近陕西北路) in Jing'an District, Shanghai. It was a popular hangout for both local Chinese and expats, with the busiest nights usually being on the weekends. During each weekday there were different activities: Monday's "You Paint, We Pour","Tequila Tuesdays", Wednesdays Acoustic Night, TableTop Thursdays (game night), Friday-Sunday varies weekend to weekend with frequently themed parties. Roxie was a safe, versatile space for the LBT community, established to give women and non-binary people a place to hang out in comfort everyday of the week. In 2024, the Roxie in Shanghai was forced to close.

=== HUNT ===
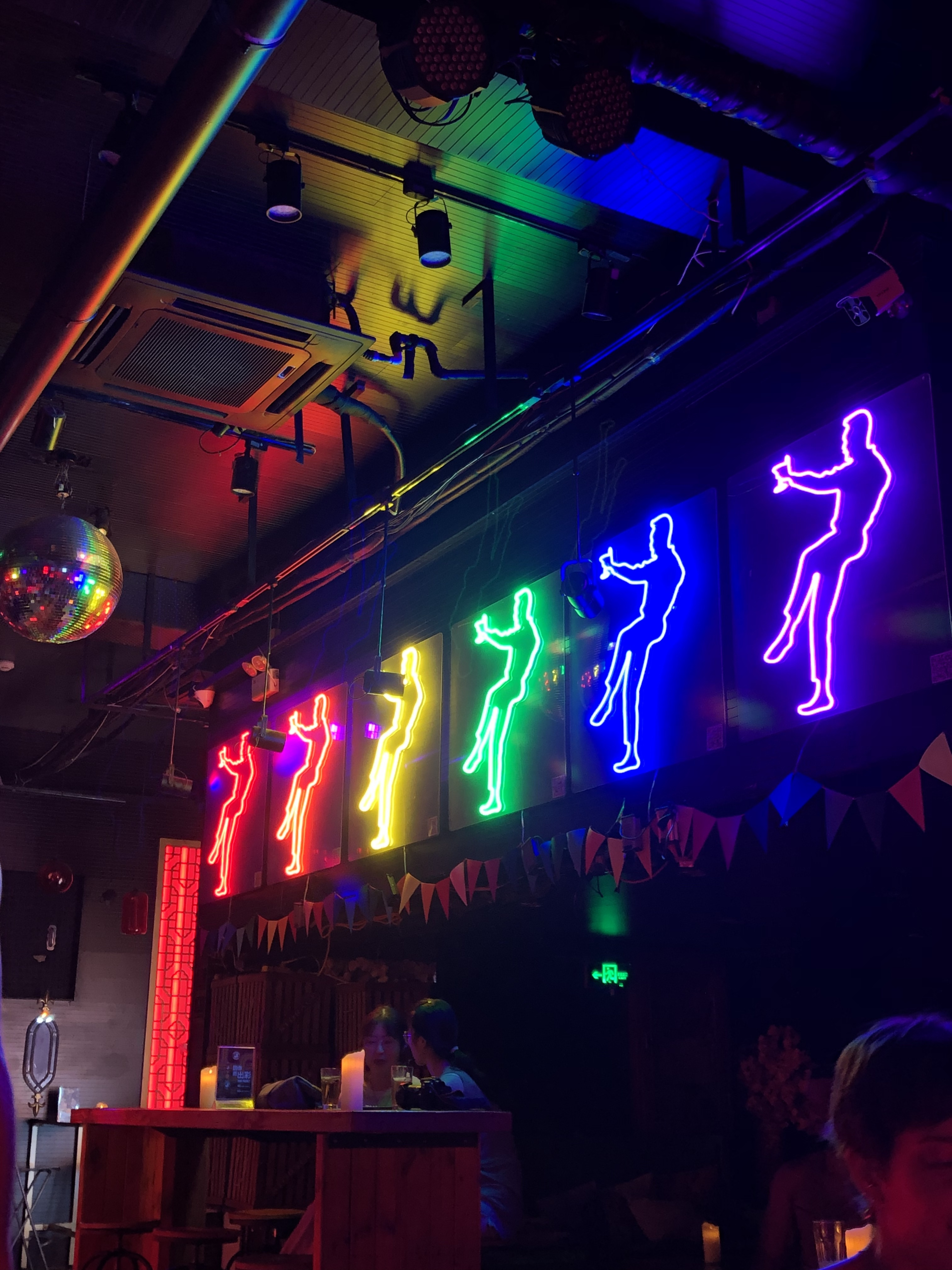
Installation of an art piece from local queer artist on display in the bar HUNT.

HUNT is a gay bar located at 42 Xingfu Road, near Fahuazhen Road (幸福路42号, 近法华镇路) in Changning District, Shanghai. Formerly known as Happiness 42, it was renamed as HUNT in 2019 when it went under new ownership. During the week there are a variety of theme nights including Drag Bingo on Thursdays, they also host viewing parties and other community events. You can find their official account HUNTShanghai on WeChat.

== Institutions ==
=== 2018+ ===
Shanghai has a buzzing LGBTQIA+ Community, but it often goes unnoticed and undetected. Below outlines some of the institutions available and that hold regular forums, and activities. These are listed in alphabetical order, and not in order of popularity:

=== DKNSTRKT ===
DKNSTRKT ("deconstruct") is a China-based cooperative of genderfluid drag lovers, a key player in China's growing drag scene. They consider a person's gender is not narrowed to just male or female. They love drag. They believe in drag for all and host workshops and performances around Shanghai. They do not run contests. DKNSTRKT want to create a diverse drag community where sexuality or gender identity is irrelevant.

=== CINEMQ ===
CINEMQ is an unrefined queer underground collective based in Shanghai. They organise events and curate content from around the world, with a focus on Chinese and East Asian queer screen culture.

=== LesQueers ===
LesQueers is one of the most activity community organizations in the city, founded by Gabby Gabriel in 2014, orienting itself towards the empowerment of LGBTQIA+ people with an emphasis on women and non-binary people. It currently has over 3,000 members and organizes 3–5 events per week from their weekly LGBTQIA+ discussion group hosted with PFLAG Shanghai, to a weekly badminton club, and even Shanghai's first Queer Salsa Class. They are also pioneering LGBTQIA+ Diversity & Inclusion Training.

=== PFLAG Shanghai ===
PFLAG Shanghai is a branch of PFLAG China ( short for Parents, Families and Friends of Lesbians and Gays of China) was established on June 28, 2008. By far, it has reached over 52 cities in China, with more than 3,000 LGBT volunteers and 120,000 registered members. PFLAG China strives to encourage LGBT people to embrace their own identity, to facilitate communication and understanding between LGBT and their families and friends, and to publicly advocate equality between sexual orientations and improve the social visibility of LGBT people through dialog, exchanges, helpline, lectures and other activities. Find their official wechat account by searching cd_pflag on WeChat.

== Education ==
In 2005, Fudan University began offering an LGBT studies program. This was the first course on LGBT culture offered in a Mainland Chinese university.

== Recreation ==
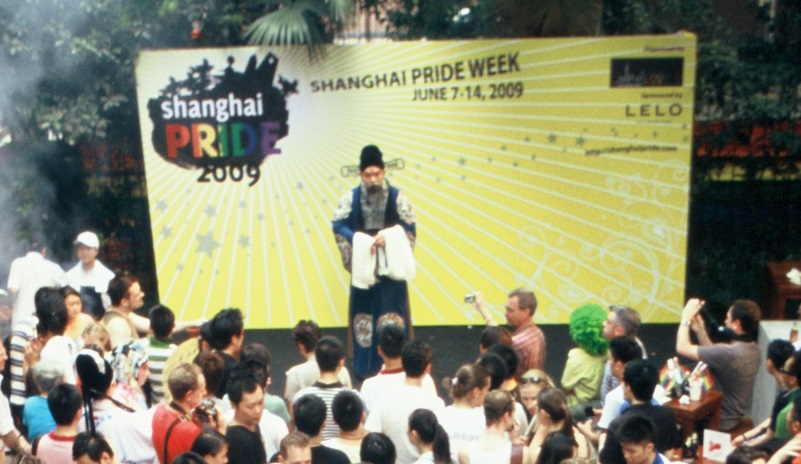
Shanghai Pride Week, 2009

Shanghai Pride is the gay pride event in Shanghai. As of 2009, it is co-organized by both Chinese and non-Chinese. The events include art exhibitions, panel discussions, films, and theater productions. By 2013 the amount of Chinese participation has increased. As of that year there is no parade component. Organizers stated that this was the first LGBT festival in China; there are individuals, mostly Chinese LGBT activists, who say that there were organized LGBT events that occurred prior to Shanghai Pride.

Sharon Owyang, the author of Frommer's Shanghai, stated Chinese society sees all sexual relations in a puritanical manner, so Shanghai does not have specialized LGBT resources. However, she claimed that "Shanghai is quite tolerant of gay and lesbian travelers".

Shanghai LGBT Tourism Week, the largest local LGBT carnival in China, is held on October 1–7 in Shanghai. During this week, local well-known LGBT organizations are invited to host a series of activities including recreational, charity, cultural and physical activities. The aim of Shanghai LGBT Tourism Week is to encourage Chinese LGBT people to come out of the closet to show off themselves, and enhance the exposure and visibility of Chinese LGBT community. In 2015, Shanghai LGBT Tourism Week attracted over 30,000 people from across the globe, and raised tens of thousands yuan for various nonprofit organizations.

== See also ==
- Homosexuality in China
- LGBT rights in China
