= Beijing Queer Chorus =

LGBTQ choral group in Beijing, China

- Also known as: Shining Jazzy Chorus (三棱减一合唱团)
- Origin: Beijing, China
- Instrument: 100 voices
- Website: blog.sina.com.cn/bjlgbtchorus (obsolete)

Founded in 2008 in Beijing and disbanded in 2024, the Beijing Queer Chorus (北京酷儿合唱团; BQC) was the first publicly performing LGBTQIA+ chorus in mainland China. BQC was a member of the GALA Choruses.

The Chorus was formerly known as Shining Jazzy Chorus.

== Introduction ==
Beijing Queer Chorus was a semiprofessional mixed choir. It was the first publicly performing LGBTQ choir in mainland China, and was one of the first two Asian choirs attending international LGBTQ choral festivals.

To practice the idea "Sing for a Better World", BQC conducted various public music events and actively participated in music communications domestically and internationally. After attending LGBTQ Chorus festivals around the world several times, the group jointly hosted the first Queer Chorus Festival in Mainland China along with six other LGBTQ choirs. Through chorus shows and cultural communication in Tianjin, Shenzhen, Huizhou, Jinan, Hong Kong, Taipei, Tokyo, Seoul, Dublin, Seattle, Portland, Denver, Minneapolis and others, chorus members hoped to break down barriers among individuals and groups.

BQC had collaborated with partners including the Chinese Health department and hospitals, the U.N., the U.S., British, Dutch, and German embassies in Beijing, TEDx, VICE China, the UCCA, and the Broadway Musical RENT. They composed music and shot videos to call for gender equity, to promote safe sex education, and to encourage people troubled by depression; They performed for healthcare practitioner for their effort to fight against Covid or HIV, and for HIV-affected adults; They held music workshops for HIV+ orphans; They held concerts with an autistic youth band, blind youth performers, and a deaf children chorus, to increase the visibility of these disabilities in society, etc.

== History ==
The chorus was founded in October 2008 as the Shining Jazzy Chorus. They performed two concerts each year before being disbanded. In June 2013, they performed with Seattle Men's Chorus assistant director, Eric Lane Barnes. The following month of that year, they met with Gary Locke. In April 2014, they changed their name to the Beijing Queer Chorus. In the same year, two BQC singers attended Various Voices Dublin 2014. In July 2016, 14 BQC singers attended the GALA choruses festival in Denver, U.S. In December 2016, they celebrated 8th anniversary. In March 2018, they toured Northwestern U.S. In 2024, the chorus was forced to be disbanded.

== See also ==
- LGBTQ culture in Beijing
- Music of China
