= LGBTQ rights in Macau =

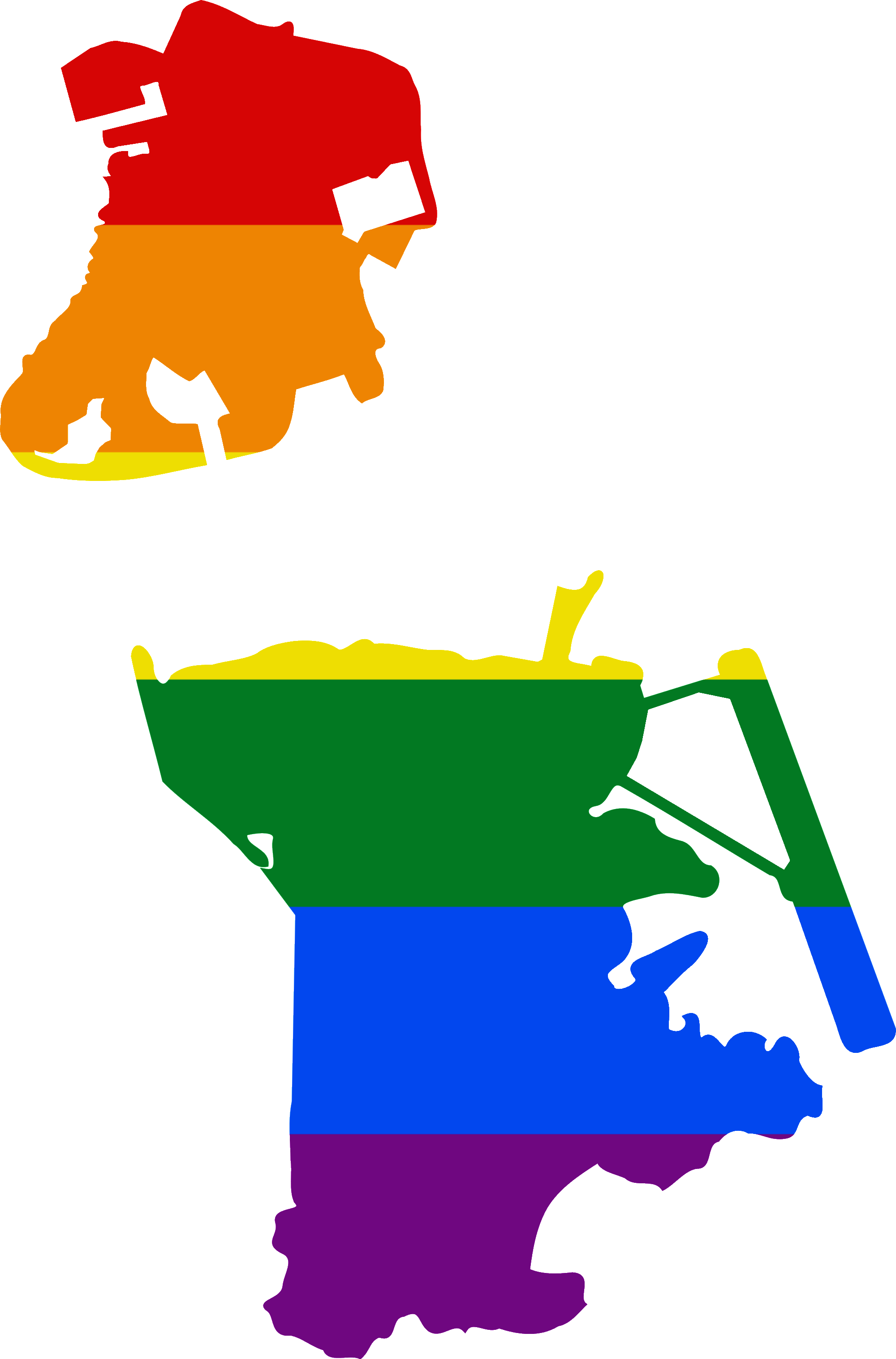
- Legal status: Legal since 1996, with an equal age of consent
- Gender identity: No
- Military: China responsible for defense
- Discrimination protections: Sexual orientation protections in employment

Family rights
- Recognition of relationships: No
- Adoption: No

Lesbian, gay, bisexual, transgender and queer (LGBTQ) persons in Macau, face legal challenges not experienced by non-LGBTQ residents. While same-sex sexual activity was decriminalized in 1996, same-sex couples and households headed by same-sex couples remain ineligible for some legal rights available to opposite-sex couples.

== Recognition of same-sex relationships ==
Same-sex marriage or civil unions are not currently recognised in Macau.

In March 2013, José Pereira Coutinho, a Member of the Legislative Assembly, submitted a bill to the Legislative Assembly to recognize same-sex civil unions, granting them the same rights as heterosexual couples, except the right to adopt. The bill was rejected with the sole vote of Coutinho in favor, 17 votes against and 4 abstentions.

== Discrimination protection ==
The Basic Law of Macau's Article 25 indicates the people of Macau are free from discrimination based on a non-exhaustive list of prohibited factors. Sexual orientation is not included in said list of prohibited discrimination grounds. However, there are anti-discrimination protections based on sexual orientation in the fields of labour relations (article 6/2 of the Law No. 7/2008), (Note: Chinese: 勞動關係法, Cantonese romanization: Lòuhduhng Gwāanhaih Faat; Portuguese: Lei das relações de trabalho) protection of personal data (article 7/1,2 of Law No. 8/2005), (Note: Chinese: 個人資料保護法, Cantonese romanization: Goyàhn Jīlíu Bóuwuh Faat; Portuguese: Lei da Protecção de Dados Pessoais) and ombudsman (article 31-A of Law No. 4/2012). (Note: Chinese: 修改第10/2000號法律《澳門特別行政區廉政公署, Cantonese romanization: Sāugói Daih 10/2000 Houh Faatleuht《Oumùhn Dahkbiht Hàhngjingkēui Lìhmjing Gūngchyúh》; Portuguese: Alteração à Lei n.° 10/2000 "Comissariado contra a Corrupção da Região Administrativa Especial de Macau")

The Principle of equality in the Labour Relations Law protects workers and job seekers from discrimination on the ground of sexual orientation. Employers who contravene the principle may be find up to MOP$50,000 for every worker or job seeker affected.

== Domestic violence law ==
In 2011, the Macau government conducted a public consultation on a draft law against domestic violence in which "same-sex cohabitants in an intimate relationship" were in the scope of protection. However, in the concluding report published in 2012, the Macau government decided to drop the reference to same-sex cohabitants for "a lack of social consensus".

In October 2015, Rainbow of Macau submitted a complaint to the UN Committee against Torture alleging the Macau government of "depriving persons in same-sex Relationship of equal protection in domestic violence legislation". The committee, in its concluding observations on Macau, noted its concern that not "all individuals in an intimate relationship regardless of their sexual orientation" were in the scope of the draft domestic violence law. The Committee urged the Macau government to protect all victims of domestic violence "without discrimination".

In 2016, the Macau government insisted on the exclusion of same-sex cohabitants from the scope of the domestic violence legislation. Rainbow of Macau criticised the Macau government for enacting "a discriminatory law" and expressed its concern about "[sending] a harmful message to Macau communities that discrimination on the ground of sexual orientation is justifiable".

== Gender identity ==
In February 2015, transgender women Avery (pseudonym) talked to the Macau media about the experience of abuse and bullying when she was studying in a local school. Avery requested the Macau authorities to change the gender marker on her identity documents. In June 2015, the Law Reform Consultative Committee announced the commencement of a study on revising the law to allow transgender people to apply for changing gender marker.

According to the UN Human Rights Committee, despite the 2017 establishment of a working group on gender identity recognition, Macau still does not allow transgender persons to change the gender marker on their birth records and identity documents, reportedly for "lack of social consensus."

In 2020, the UN Human Rights Committee asked the Macau government to provide information on any step taken to "legally recognize transgender persons" and enable them to change the gender marker on identity documents. In 2022, it stated that Macau should "put in place a simple, transparent and accessible procedure for the legal gender recognition of transgender persons."

Between 2004 and 28 February 2026, Macau's Identification Services Bureau received eight written requests to change gender on identification documents, all of which were rejected purportedly "in accordance with the law".

In April 2026, the Legal Affairs Bureau said that legal gender recognition still required "prudent study" and given issues related to Macau's "core values, civil law provisions, and family relations," there are "no plans" to revise the legal framework.

== Homophobia ==
=== Stigmatisation ===
On 9 June 2015, local newspaper Exmoo published a story on the front page about a high school student allegedly molesting a 9-year-old child. The perpetrator was referred to as "gay demon" (Chinese: 基魔) in the title of the story. Spokesperson for Rainbow of Macau Jason Chao, in an article published in the Macau Concealers, criticised the use of the term "demon". Chao said the Penal Code of Macau treats homosexual and heterosexual sex offenders in the same way. The abuse of power relations, rather than homosexuality, would constitute an aggravation in this criminal case. Chao added that the newspaper's logic would justify the saying that "straight demons" were invading Macau "en masse" since the perpetrators in Macau's sex abuse cases had been predominately heterosexual.

=== Clinical examination ===
On 16 August 2018, deputy director of the Education and Youth Affairs Bureau (DSEJ) Leong Vai Kei said that students with "indications of homosexuality" would be referred to doctors or psychologists for a medical examination. Later, Leong claimed that the media had misquoted her and apologised for the incorrect translation from Cantonese.

== LGBT rights activism and culture ==
In late 2012 it was announced the creation of the "Macau LGBT Rights Concern Group", led by openly gay politician Jason Chao. Since the creation of the Concern Group it has had an active presence in local media advocating for LGBT rights, namely the inclusion of gay couples in the domestic violence bill and the recognition of same-sex marriage or civil unions. In April 2013 was created the association "Rainbow of Macau", a new group striving to protect the rights of Macau's LGBT community. The Rainbow of Macau is the city's first gay rights group officially registered and is led by Anthony Lam Ka Long.

Despite the surge in LGBT activism, gay culture in Macau remains mostly invisible. However, the lesbian-themed movie I'm here, directed by Tracy Choi, won the Macau Indies 2012 Jury's Award at the Macau International Film and Video Festival 2012 (MIFVF). According to the newspaper Macau Daily Times, "the movie depicts the problems that homosexuals face in their daily life, especially when living in a small town" like Macau.

== Summary table ==
Same-sex sexual activity legal	Yes (Since 1996)
Equal age of consent (14)	Yes
Anti-discrimination laws in employment	Yes (Since 2008)
Anti-discrimination laws in provision of goods and services	No
Anti-discrimination laws in indirect discrimination, hate speech and hate violence	No
Same-sex marriages	No
Recognition of same-sex couples (e.g. civil partnerships)	No
Step-child adoption by same-sex couples	No
Joint adoption by same-sex couples	No
LGBT people allowed to serve openly in the military	(China is responsible for defense)
Right to change legal gender	
Intersex minors protected from invasive surgical procedures	No
Third gender option	No
Conversion therapy banned on minors	No
Access to IVF for lesbians	No
Automatic parenthood for both spouses after birth	No
Commercial surrogacy for gay male couples	No
MSMs allowed to donate blood	No

== See also ==
- Human rights in Macau
- LGBT rights in China
- LGBT rights in Hong Kong
- LGBT rights in Asia
