= Conscription in China =

The People's Liberation Army (PLA) began as an all-volunteer force in 1947. In 1955, following the proclamation of the People's Republic of China, as part of an effort to modernize the PLA, the first Military Service Law created a system of compulsory military service. Since the late 1970s, the Chinese conscription laws mandate a hybrid system that combines conscripts and volunteers. Due to sufficient volunteer recruitment, mandatory military service has not been enacted in China since 1949.

== Current system ==
The Chinese system operates through a process of draft registration. De jure, military service with the PLA is obligatory for all Chinese citizens. However, mandatory military service has not been enacted in China since 1949. According to the CIA's The World Factbook, "the PLA’s conscription system functions as a levy; the PLA establishes the number of enlistees needed, which produces quotas for the provinces; each province provides a set number of soldiers or sailors; if the number of volunteers fails to meet quotas, the local governments may compel individuals to enter military service."

By law, male citizens have to register themselves with the government authorities when they reach 18 years old. Local governments have recruitment quotas, and registered citizens are not called when the quotas are met. These registered citizens automatically become reserves and are required to attend short training sessions periodically before age 22. They would no longer be liable for service after age 22. Those who are aged between 17 and 18 can also voluntarily register for the draft. For those who entered PLA as conscripts, if they fulfilled their service obligation can stay in the military as volunteer soldiers for a total of 16 years. In practice, mandatory military service has not been implemented since 1949 as the People's Liberation Army has been able to recruit sufficient numbers voluntarily.

=== Differences in linguistic and legal definitions ===
Those who voluntarily join the force are still counted as "conscripts" in the PLA but are provided with personal allowances, family subsidies, and post-service employment support. If the "conscripts" choose to stay in the force after two years of service, they can become a non-commissioned officer (NCO), with a higher, regular salary.

According to Jamestown Foundation, the Chinese military has indistinct definitions of the terms regarding conscription. For example, the term "conscripts" (Chinese: 义务兵; pinyin: Yìwùbīng; lit. 'obligated soldier') refers to all enlisted military personnel regardless of their status as recruited, conscripted, or voluntarily joined. Similarly, the term "conscription" (Chinese: 征兵; pinyin: Zhēngbīng; lit. 'conscription') makes no distinction between "conscription", "enlistment", and "recruitment" in the PLA documentation. Those who volunteered to join the force are still called "[being] conscripted" by the PLA.

For a substantial amount of time, the Chinese military rarely used the word "volunteers", which has become interchangeable with the word "non-commissioned officer" (NCO) in their forces. For the first two years of recruited personnel, regardless of their status as conscripted or voluntarily joined, all are designated "conscripts". When the "conscripts" become NCOs, they are sometimes called "volunteers". This practice has led to the confusion that the PLA is a conscription-based force. In 2011, China modified the Military Service Law, attempting to standardize the concept of conscription in line with international standards, in which the PLA was defined as a "hybrid force" consisting of both conscripts and volunteers, with "volunteers being the majority". According to research conducted by Taiwanese Ministry of Defense, the revised language helps to clarify that current PLA members are all voluntarily joined, while the "hybrid force" designation maintains the flexibility for the future implementation of the "compulsory military service" when needed.

=== Punishment ===
Even though mandatory military service has not been implemented since 1949, people avoiding service when called up are still liable for punishment, and Chinese authorities criticize those youths who do not want to join the army.

== History ==
Between 1949 and 1955, the PLA implemented the Voluntary Military Service System to gradually transform from the informal Militia System (Chinese: 民兵制). Individuals who volunteer for military service serve in the military for an extended period. However, without formal legislation to codify or regulate the system, complex political dynamics, such as the Land Reform Movement, led to instances of violence between militia members and civilians that were not brought to justice. The system faced problems such as a lack of proper trainings and aging populations.

On July 30, 1955, the Second Session of the First National People's Congress passed China's first Military Service Law, and the PLA began implementing the conscription system. During this period, except for a few units that retained a very small number of voluntary soldiers, the entire military essentially operated under a uniform obligated conscription system. The Military Service Law stipulated the service duration for conscripts as follows: three years for the army, four years for the air force, and five years for the navy. The duration of active duty for conscripts has undergone several changes over the years. In 1965, the service periods were set at 4 years for the Army, 5 years for the Air Force, and 6 years for the Navy. In 1967, these were adjusted to 2 years for the Army, 3 years for the Air Force, and 4 years for the Navy. Starting in 1978, the active duty periods were revised to 3 years for Army soldiers, 4 years for soldiers in the Air Force, Navy ground forces, and Army special technical units, and 5 years for soldiers in Navy vessel units and Army ship units. On May 31, 1984, the Second Session of the Sixth National People's Congress reviewed and approved the revised "Military Service Law of the People's Republic of China." The law set the service periods to 3 years for the Army and 4 years for the Air Force and Navy. The 1998 amendment standardized the active duty period for conscripts to 2 years and eliminated provisions for extended service.
