= Military education and training in China =

Part of school education

Military education and training in China (simplified Chinese: 军训; traditional Chinese: 軍訓; pinyin: jūnxùn) is a form of fundamental defense education required by The Military Service Law of the People's Republic of China and The Decisions of the Central Committee of the Communist Party about Education System Reform.

== Imperial China ==
Military training traces back to the feudal era in China. According to the Book of Rites and Zhou, the Western Zhou dynasty had two levels of studies: guoxue and xiangxue. The university in the Western Zhou dynasty focused on martial arts and teachers were military officers. The major content of military training was learning archery and driving chariots. This is the earliest known instance of military training. Later dynasties continued the practice. During the Qing dynasty the Baoding Military Academy was set up for training officers in modern warfare techniques.

== Republican China ==
Under the Kuomintang, the Whampoa Military Academy of Republican China was organized for officer training and boy scouts training also existed.

== People's Republic of China ==
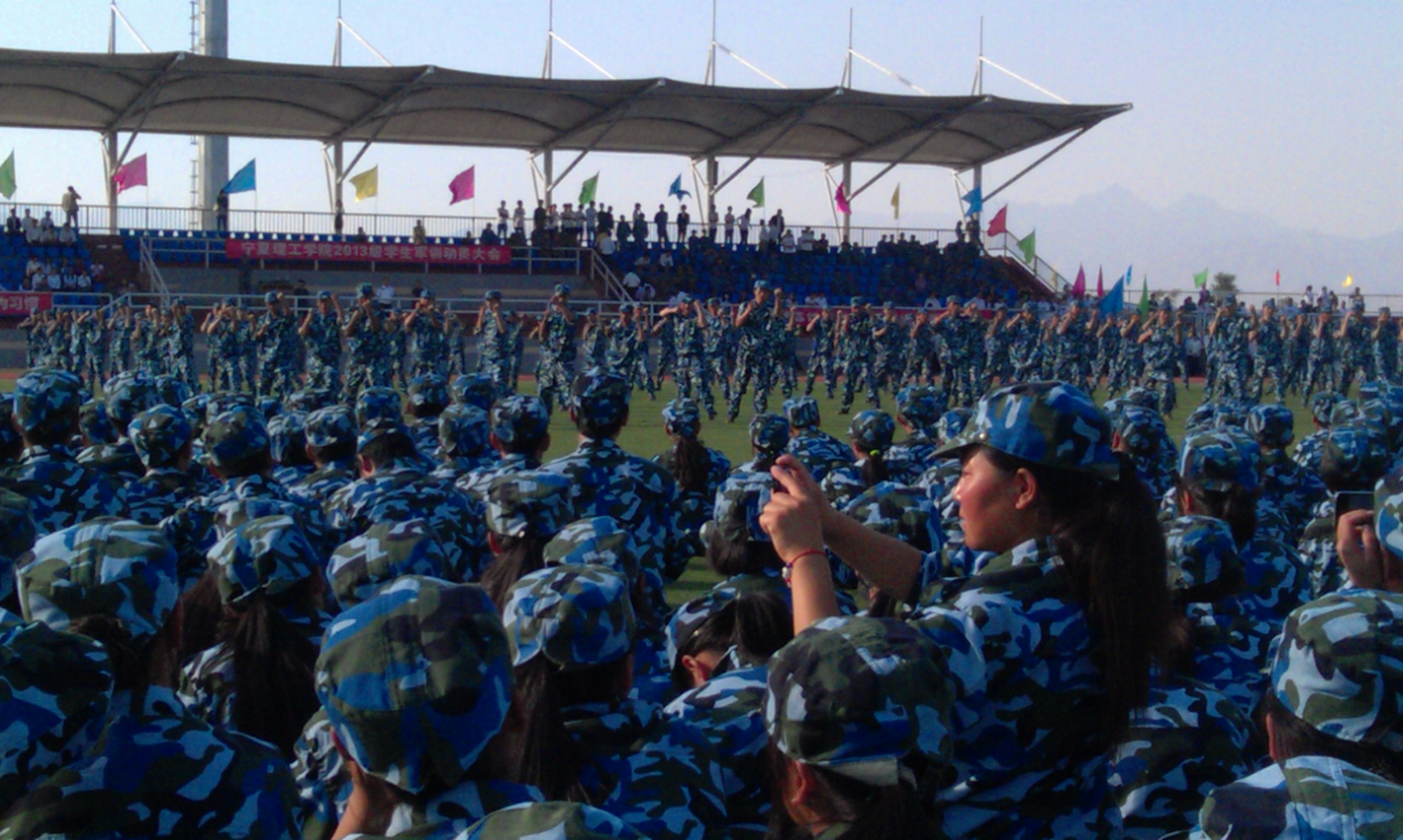
Students performing Chinese boxing on a college field during military training.

Provisioning of military training was outlined in the Military Service Law, published in 1984 and revised in 1998. It included training for students starting in middle school by military instructors. The 2001 National Defense Education law mandated education officials and staff to provide military training or indoctrination in curricula and activities from the primary level. The armed forces were instructed to aid indoctrination through propaganda, cultural events, and cultural institutions.

The People's Liberation Army administers several institutions for military education. These include the Academy of Military Sciences, National Defense University and the National University of Defense Technology.
