= ShanghaiPride =

LGBTQ event in Shanghai, China

Shanghai Pride logo

Shanghai Pride (Chinese: 上海骄傲节; pinyin: Shànghǎi jiāo'ào jié) was an annual LGBT pride in Shanghai. It was one of the first major LGBT events to take place in mainland China. The organization ceased its operations in China in 2020.

== History ==
Shanghai Pride was founded by members of Shanghai LGBT, a group which had been organizing community social events since 2006. The first pride was led by Americans Tiffany Lemay and Hannah Miller. The team also included Malaysian Charlene Liu, who was the nominal head of the organization at its closure in 2020.

According to Miller, various smaller prides had been held earlier, including one in 2008 at Pink Home. Following a weekend of events, organizers, 'started to talk about larger possibilities for pride.'

The first Shanghai Pride was held from 7 to 13 June 2009. The organizers took various steps to avoid being shut down by the authorities, including not holding a public parade, hosting events at private venues, and publishing materials only in English. According to Miller, they had received legal advice that the event would have better chance of being allowed to proceed if it was framed as a party for foreigners. The first pride was attended by more than a thousand people, including local Chinese, foreigner residents and tourists. It was featured on the front page of China Daily, which called it 'a source of great encouragement to the tens of millions of comrades', citing its 'profound significance' for China. Events included art exhibitions, film screenings and discussions. An opening dinner was held at Vargas Grill and a closing party was held at M on the Bund.

The second and third Shanghai Prides took place in October over a 3-week period. In addition to events from the previous year, the organizers added a family day, inspired by PFLAG events in Beijing.

In 2012, the organizers announced that pride would move back to June as a 9-day festival.

In 2014, volunteers promoted Shanghai Pride with a flash mob dance routine on the banks of the Huangpu.

In 2015, several new initiatives expanded the scope and reach of Shanghai Pride. The organizers launched 'Love is our future', a digital campaign designed by Wunderman Shanghai, asking people around the world to show solidarity for the LGBTQ community by holding hands.

ShanghaiPRIDE Film Festival was also launched in 2015. The 10 day program featured screenings, talks and workshops, in addition to a short film competition to promote emerging Chinese LGBTQ filmmakers. The festival theme was 'home', and it opened with the mainland Chinese premiere of Lilting, attended by star Cheng Pei-pei.

2015 also saw the debut of Shanghai Pride Theater Festival.

In 2016, the film festival theme was 'gender', focusing on trans and other gender minorities. It also featured a 20th anniversary screening of East Palace West Palace, attended by filmmaker Zhang Yuan. Actor Ian McKellen met with LGBTQ groups before Pride, and recorded a special video message for Shanghai Pride attendees.

In 2018, Shanghai Pride celebrated its 10th year, with an estimated 7000 people attending. A program of 40 events opened with Pride Run, a colorful 3 km run along the Huangpu. The organizers invited NGOs and advocacy groups from different parts of the country to Shanghai for an Open Day event. They also partnered with Out & Equal Workplace Advocates, who delivered a conference and recruitment fair aimed at advancing LGBTQ diversity and inclusion in the workplace.

The eleventh Shanghai Pride was held from 8 to 16 June 2019. It was preceded by a Rainbow Bike Ride to mark IDAHOBIT in May. The year also featured 'Raise the Pride' campaign by Sogi, in response to bans on Pride flags.

The final Shanghai Pride took place 13 to 21 June 2020.

== Closure of Organization ==
Shanghai Pride encountered challenges from local authorities throughout its 12 years of operation. This included last-minute venue changes, either from venue owner's own concerns, or because of pressure from authorities. Accordingly, the organizers would always, "have to have a plan B or C."

Restrictions escalated over the years, and were exacerbated by the COVID-19 pandemic, which brought a heightened sensitivity to 'foreign forces' (境外势力). In August 2020, it was announced that Shanghai Pride would go on indefinite hiatus, with no further information leading to speculation. One year later, in an open letter published on Shanghai Pride official Wechat, organizer Raymond Phang wrote, 'Pride has grown to a scale that was probably being too visible, probably making an impact, and thus catching too much (unwanted) attention...we had to make a painful decision to put the longest-running Pride in this region to a stop in mid-August.'

The closure was not directly requested by the authorities, but was the result of increased pressure on individual organizers and volunteers, including disruption to their jobs and daily lives. "I have to clarify that we were not requested (by officials) to suspend the Pride. It was our own decision. It was in 2020 that the attention paid to us increased so much that it impacted the personal lives of our organizers," Phang said. He also stated that he had had to leave China in 2020 as a result.

== Impact and Legacy ==
Shanghai Pride had a significant impact on the LGBTQ community in China, whilst also leaving an ambiguous legacy. It has been described as choosing to be, 'politically cautious and non-confrontational,' whilst also acknowledging that the, 'sensitive environment meant there was always a ceiling on Shanghai Pride's growth.' As such a visible organization, it was seen as a bell-weather for the state of the LGBT community in China.

Shanghai Pride has been referred to as the first LGBT festival in China, but there were various previous queer cultural events organized across the country that predate it, including in Beijing and various provincial cities. According to Engebretsen, the 'first' discourse replicates a globalized, cosmopolitan mode of queer visibility that "effectively erased knowledge regarding previous local initiatives that played with alternative, roundabout definitions of 'Pride' and 'the public'". This label was dropped in later years. Shanghai Pride has been described as, 'one of the largest and longest-running pride festivals in Greater China, behind only the Pride Parades in Hong Kong and Taipei'.

In the wake of the announced closure in 2020, commentators in media and online described the loss for the community nationwide. They also linked it to an increasingly hostile environment for NGOs and organizers working with the LGBTQ community, with many activists declining to comment on the record. One explained, "The public gets to see the visible and impactful aspects of what we do, but they can't imagine the difficulties we face behind the scenes – I think Shanghai Pride is no exception." Other organizations closed around the same time, including the prominent group LGBT Rights Advocacy China in 2021, and Beijing LGBT Center, one of the largest and most historically significant organizations in China, in 2023.

Shanghai Pride has been described as transnational and commercial, as a critique of both its accessibility and its politics. From his 2009 field research, Bao notes that the original organizing committee was primarily foreign (this is disputed by Miller), with events presented primarily in English, and from a Western queer perspective - this includes the staging of the play Beautiful Thing. Bao also notes the commercial accessibility of events in 2009, which included dinners, wine tastings and parties priced at 150 RMB. He quotes an organizer telling him, "We welcome local participants," but that they wanted to keep numbers manageable and have attendees 'feeling comfortable' around each other. Bao identifies 'comfort' as a euphemism for class and taste preference, drawing on notions of sexual capital and global citizenship.

Shanghai Pride was supported by various corporate and foreign consular partners. Their approach to activism has been described as one in which support for LGBTQ equality was framed as making 'good business sense'. One organizer surnamed Wei explained, 'If we talk about human rights or we talk like the "politicals", the Chinese people wouldn't care. What they care about is money. So...let's use money to talk'. Conway points out the failure of this strategy when crackdowns in 2020 were met with a retraction of corporate support and the closure of the organization.

It has been claimed that many local residents were not aware of Shanghai Pride. Those who were aware faced barriers to participation, with one explaining, "I wanted to join but then found out you needed to speak English. I just wanted to be a volunteer but their requirement was so high." Others have been more positive about their experiences attending or volunteering, with one participant stating, 'There are so many people that are still having a hard time accepting their identity, and as a result they are depressed. ShanghaiPRIDE can be there to help these people. We need to show them that we are living good lives in this world, and in this city, specifically.'

== See also ==
- LGBT culture in Shanghai
- Homosexuality in China
- Human rights in China
