= Lala =

Lala or La La may refer to:

== Geography ==
- Lala language (disambiguation)

=== Places ===
- Lala (Naples Metro), an underground metro station in Naples, Italy
- Lala, Assam, a town in Assam, India
- Lala, Ilam, a village in Ilam Province, Iran
- Lala, Lanao del Norte, a municipality in the Philippines
- Lala, Mazandaran, a village in Mazandaran Province, Iran
- Lala, Pakistan, a village in Punjab Province
- Lala River (disambiguation)
- Lala, Lebanon, village in the Beqaa Governorate, Lebanon

== People ==
- Lala (given name)
- Lala (nickname)
- Lala (surname)
- Lála, a Czech surname
- Lala people, a Bantu ethnic group found in the Serenje District of the Central Province of Zambia
- Lala (title), a Turkish title meaning tutor
  - Lala Kara Mustafa Pasha (c. 1500–1580), Ottoman general and Grand Vizier
  - Lala Shahin Pasha (1330–after 1388), Ottoman governor

== Fictional characters ==
- Lala, the title character of Fancy Lala, a 1998 anime series
- Lala Hagoromo, a character of Japanese anime Star Twinkle Precure
- Lala Satalin Deviluke, the main female character in To Love-Ru
- Lala or Lara Doucette, the main female character on the video podcast Tiki Bar TV
- Laa Laa, one of the Teletubbies

== Brands and enterprises ==
- Lala (website), a former online music store, originally a web-based CD trading community
- Grupo Lala, a Mexican dairy company
- LaLa, a Japanese manga magazine published by Hakusensha
- LALA FC, a football club from Ciudad Guayana, Venezuela
- The La La's, a set of internationally renowned vineyards in the Cote-Rotie wine region of France
- La La La Human Steps, a former Canadian dance ensemble

== Music ==
- La la (music), a style of Louisianan Creole music

=== Albums ===
- L.A. L.A. (album), a retrospective album by Stiv Bators and also the name of a song by the artist

=== Songs ===
- "La La" (Ashlee Simpson song), 2004
- "Lala" (Myke Towers song), 2023
- "Lala (Unlocked)", a 2021 song by Alicia Keys
- "La-La (Means I Love You)", a 1967 song by the Delfonics
- "L.A. Love (La La)", a 2014 song by Fergie
- "L.A., L.A." (song), a song by Capone-N-Noreaga featuring Mobb Deep and Tragedy Khadafi
- "Lala", song by The Obsessives
- "La La", an instrumental by Led Zeppelin, first released in the 2014 deluxe edition of their 1969 album Led Zeppelin II
- "La La", a song by Lil Wayne from his 2008 album Tha Carter III
- "La La", a song by Teairra Marí from her 2005 album Teairra Marí
- "The La La Song", a 2003 song by Marilyn Manson
- "LA LA", a song by Ski Mask the Slump God from his 2018 album Stokeley
- "L.A. L.A.", single by Stiv Bators from L.A. L.A.

== Other uses ==
- List of storms named Lala, two named tropical cyclones in the Central Pacific
- Lala (Chinese slang), a Chinese slang term for lesbian (non-derogatory)

== See also ==
- Laal (disambiguation)
- Lal (disambiguation)
- Lalan (disambiguation)
- Lali (disambiguation)
