= Lalli (disambiguation) =

Lalli is an apocryphal character from Finnish history. It may also refer to:

== Places in Estonia ==
- Lalli, Rapla County, a village
- Lalli, Saare County, a village
- Lalli, Tartu County, a village

== People ==
- Andrea Lalli (born 1987), Italian long-distance runner
- Blake Lalli (born 1983), American minor league baseball manager and former Major League Baseball player
- Bruno Senna Lalli (born 1983), Brazilian racing driver
- Cele Goldsmith Lalli (1933–2002), American magazine editor
- Domenico Lalli, pseudonym of Italian poet and librettist Sebastiano Biancardi (1679–1741)
- Eduardo Trejos Lalli (born 1972), Costa Rican politician
- Franco Lalli (born 1985), Canadian former soccer player
- Gennaro Tedeschini Lalli (1889–1948), Italian Air Force World War II general
- Giovanni Battista Lalli (1572–1637), Italian poet and jurist
- Maarit Lalli (born 1964), Finnish film director, producer and screenwriter
- Matt Lalli (born 1986), American lacrosse player
- S. A. Lalli, Indian economist and professor
- Lalli Partinen (1941–2022), Finnish ice hockey player
- Hardiljeet Singh (1932–2014), known as "Lalli", Indian literary scholar

== See also ==
- Lalli Alliance of Finland, a Finnish far-right organization from 1929 to 1930
- Lali (disambiguation)
