= Lalan =

Lalan may refer to:

== People ==
- Lalan (artist), Chinese-French artist
- Lalan Singh, Indian politician
- Lalan Sarang, Indian producer and actress (1938–2018)

== Places ==
- Lalan, Indonesia, a district in the Musi Banyuasin Regency, South Sumatra Province, Sumatra, Indonesia
- Lalan-e Olya, East
- Lalan-e Sofla, East Azerbaijan
- Lalan, Isfahan
- Lalan, Markazi
- Lalan, Tehran
- Lalan (artist), Xie Jinglan

== See also ==
- Lala (disambiguation)
- Lalon, the great Bengali Baul saint
- Lalanga, a type of flatbread
