= Emerald (given name) =

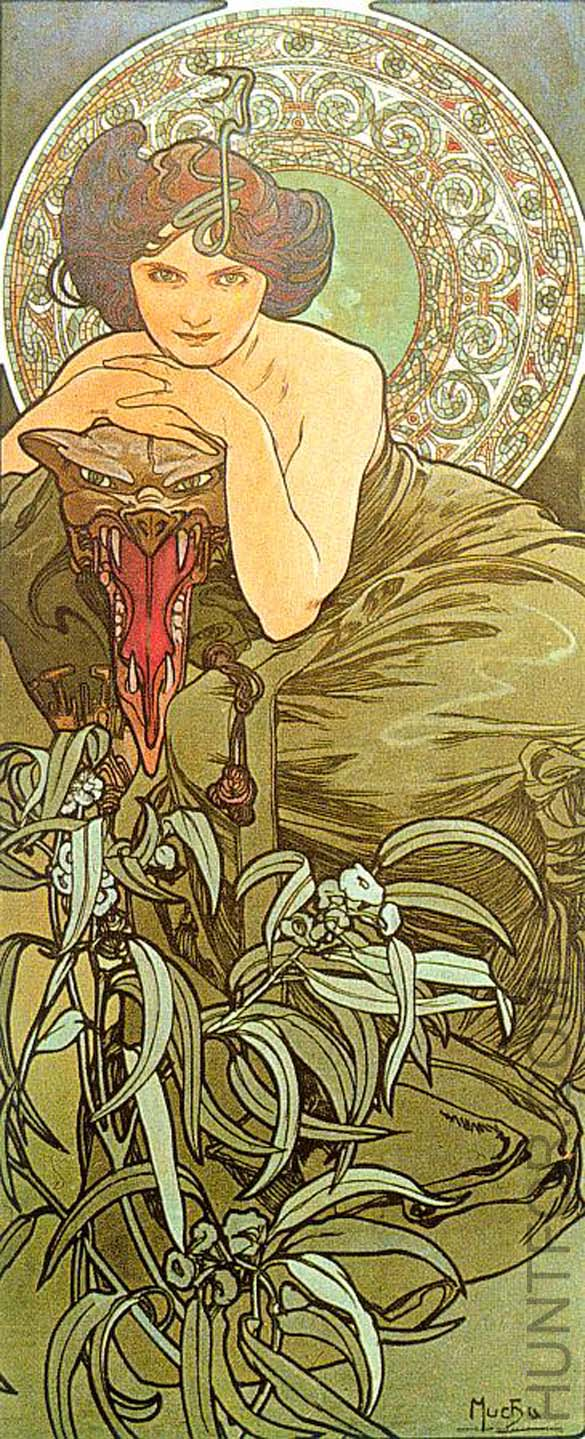
- Emerald, an Art Nouveau illustration by Alfons Mucha.
- Gender: Primarily feminine

Origin
- Origin: English
- Meaning: emerald

Other names
- Related names: Esmeralda, Esméralda, Esmé, Esme, Zümra

Emerald is a modern, primarily feminine given name of English origin given in reference to the gemstone.

== Popularity ==
It has seen regular use in the United States and other English-speaking countries. It ranked among the top 1,000 names given to newborn girls in the United States between 1991 and 2002, peaking at No. 765 during that period. The popularity of other gemstone names for girls such as Ruby and of names with an Em- sound such as Emily and Emma might have influenced the increased use of the name for girls. It was the 707th most popular name in 2024 for girls in the United States, with 396 girls given the name that year. Twenty-six American boys were also given the name that year.

== Women ==
- Emerald Egwim, Nigerian-American sprinter
- Emerald Fennell (born 1985), British actress, filmmaker, and writer
- Emerald Ignacio (born 1980), American actress and model
- Emerald MacDonald, Canadian actress
- Emerald O'Hanrahan (born 1986), English actress
- Emerald Robinson, American broadcaster
- Emerald Yeh (born 1956), American journalist and philanthropist
- Emerald Zellers, Miss Arizona contestant

== Men ==
- Emerald Lamme (1905–1957), American athlete
- Emerald Madlala, South African politician
- Emerald B. Wilson (1896–1975), American football and basketball coach
