= Esmé Stuart =

Esmé Stuart or Stewart may refer to:

- Esmé Stewart, 1st Duke of Lennox (1542–1583), son of John Stewart, 5th Lord of Aubigny
- Esmé Stuart, 2nd Duke of Lennox, Scottish nobleman
- Esmé Stewart, 3rd Duke of Lennox (1579–1624), son of Esmé Stewart, 1st Duke of Lennox
- Esmé Stuart, 2nd Duke of Richmond (1649–1660), also 5th Duke of Lennox

== See also ==
- Esmè Stuart, writer
