= Xian (activist) =

Chinese LGBT activist

- Occupation: LGBT rights activist

Xiao Xian, better known simply as Xian, is a Chinese activist best known for founding Tongyu, a Beijing-based lesbian/lala organization. Outside of Tongyu, Xian has been active in the Chinese LGBT community, and in the international LGBT community.

== Biography ==
Xian first began searching for information and resources about the LGBT community while in college, but was limited by the lack of LGBT information and literature available in university libraries in China. After the introduction of the internet to Chinese universities in the late 1990s, she was able to seek out lesbian newsgroups through rudimentary search functions such as Gopher. She used these online groups to contact LGBT Chinese expatriates abroad, and to arrange physical meetups with groups of LGBT people in China.

Xian became an active organizer of the lesbian, bisexual, and transgender community in China in the late 90s into the 21st Century, organizing with other members of the LGBT community through bars and websites. In 1996, she created Purple Phoenix, an online NGO which provided news and informational materials to the Chinese lesbian community through email and website communication. She also founded Saturday Salon, a weekly gathering of lesbians in Beijing.

Through her work with the LGBT community, Xian has raised awareness of the familial and social pressures which make life difficult for lesbians in China, such as the pressure to marry and the difficulty of becoming fully independent of homophobic family members. She has spoken on the differences between the LGBT movement in the West and that of China, especially the under representation of lesbian rights and recognition by the women's movement in Beijing.

Throughout her career, Xian has advocated for a pragmatic approach to LGBT rights and recognition in China that focuses on the need to put survival ahead of immediate government recognition and media attention. In a 2006 interview with China Newsweek she commented that she felt overly idealistic and extreme feminist beliefs had harmed lesbian causes in China, as rights like same sex marriage were still too extreme for mainstream Chinese society. Xian has helped to organize and support Beijing Lala Salon, which provides community activities to the lesbian community in Beijing.

Xian studied in the United States and earned a master's degree. While in the United States, she became involved in the local lesbian community and volunteered for the Beijing Aizhixing Institute of Health Education (BAIHE). During this time, Xian was introduced to the concept of NGOs and began formulating plans to create a lesbian advocacy group and network in Beijing, where she felt there was a reasonably large lesbian community.

=== Tongyu ===
Xian founded Tongyu, a lesbian advocacy organization, in 2004, after returning to Beijing from the United States. The name "Tongyu" translates to "Common Language" in English. In connection with Tongyu, she invited LGBT activists from Taiwan and Hong Kong to Beijing to share their insights and experience with activists in mainland China. Tongyu operates a lesbian hotline, attends academic conferences and student events, hands out pamphlets and educational materials. In addition to advocating for issues like same-sex marriage and LGBT rights, Tongyu supports "salons", clubs where lesbians can organize to discuss matters related to the LGBT community and share information about topics such as safe sex. The organization also supports Chinese lesbian and lala organizations and publications such as Saturday Salon and Les+ Magazine. Tongyu works with activists from other Asian countries such as Taiwan and India, and was the largest lesbian, bisexual, and transgender advocacy organization in Beijing as of 2018.
