= Lalla (disambiguation) =

Lalla (c. 720–790) was an Indian mathematician and astronomer.

Lalla may also refer to:

== People ==
- Lalla of Arneae (fl. c. 80–c. 100), Graeco-Roman civic benefactor
- Lalla Latifa (born c. 1945), mother of the king of Morocco
- Lalla Fatma N'Soumer (c. 1830–1863), member of the Kabyle resistance against the French colonial army
- Lalla Ward (born 1951), English actress
- Princess Lalla Salma of Morocco (born 1978 as Salma Bennani), consort of the king of Morocco

== Other uses ==
- Lalla (title), an Amazigh (berber) title of respect
- Lalla, Tasmania, Australia, a town

== See also ==
- Lalla Rookh (disambiguation)
- Lallans, a Scots word used to mean the lowlands of Scotland or Scots language
- Lallation (disambiguation)
