= Esmé Stewart, 1st Duke of Lennox =

Scottish-French nobleman (c.1542–1583)

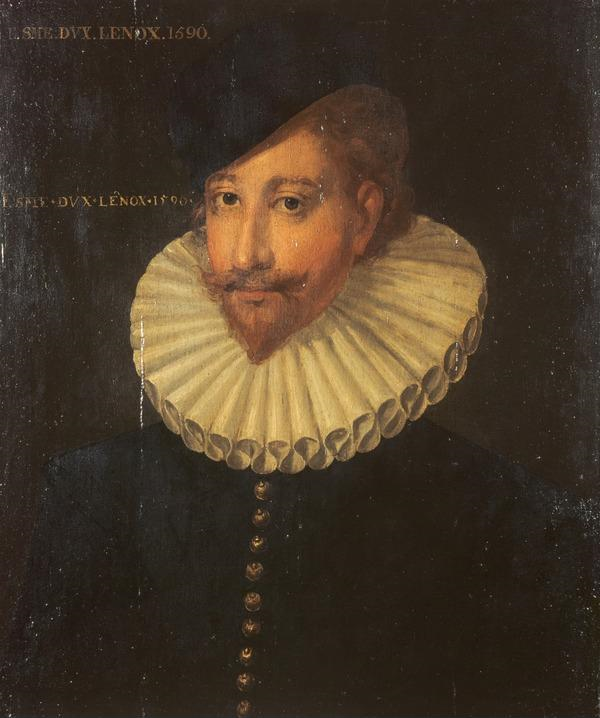
- Posthumous portrait of the Duke of Lennox, 1590
- Born: Esmé Stewart c. 1542
- Died: 26 May 1583 (aged 40–41); Paris, France
- Spouse: Catherine de Balsac (after 1572)
- Issue: Ludovic Stewart, 2nd Duke of Lennox; Esmé Stewart, 3rd Duke of Lennox; Gabrielle Stewart; Henrietta Stewart; Marie Stewart, Countess of Mar
- Parents: John Stewart, 5th Seigneur d'Aubigny; Anne de la Queuille

Arms of Esmé Stewart, 1st Duke of Lennox, 1st Earl of Lennox: Quarterly of 4, 1&4: Arms awarded in 1427 by King Charles VII of France to Sir John Stewart of Darnley, 1st Seigneur d'Aubigny, 1st Seigneur de Concressault and 1st Comte d'Évreux, Constable of the Scottish Army in France: Royal arms of France within a bordure of Bonkyll, for the arms of the de Bonkyll family of Bonkyll Castle in Scotland (whose canting arms were three buckles), ancestors of Stewart of Bonkyll, ancestors of Stewart of Darnley, a junior line; 2&3: Stewart of Darnley: Arms of Stewart, Hereditary High Steward of Scotland, a bordure engrailed gules for difference; overall an inescutcheon of Lennox, Earl of Lennox, the heiress of whom was the wife of Sir John Stewart of Darnley

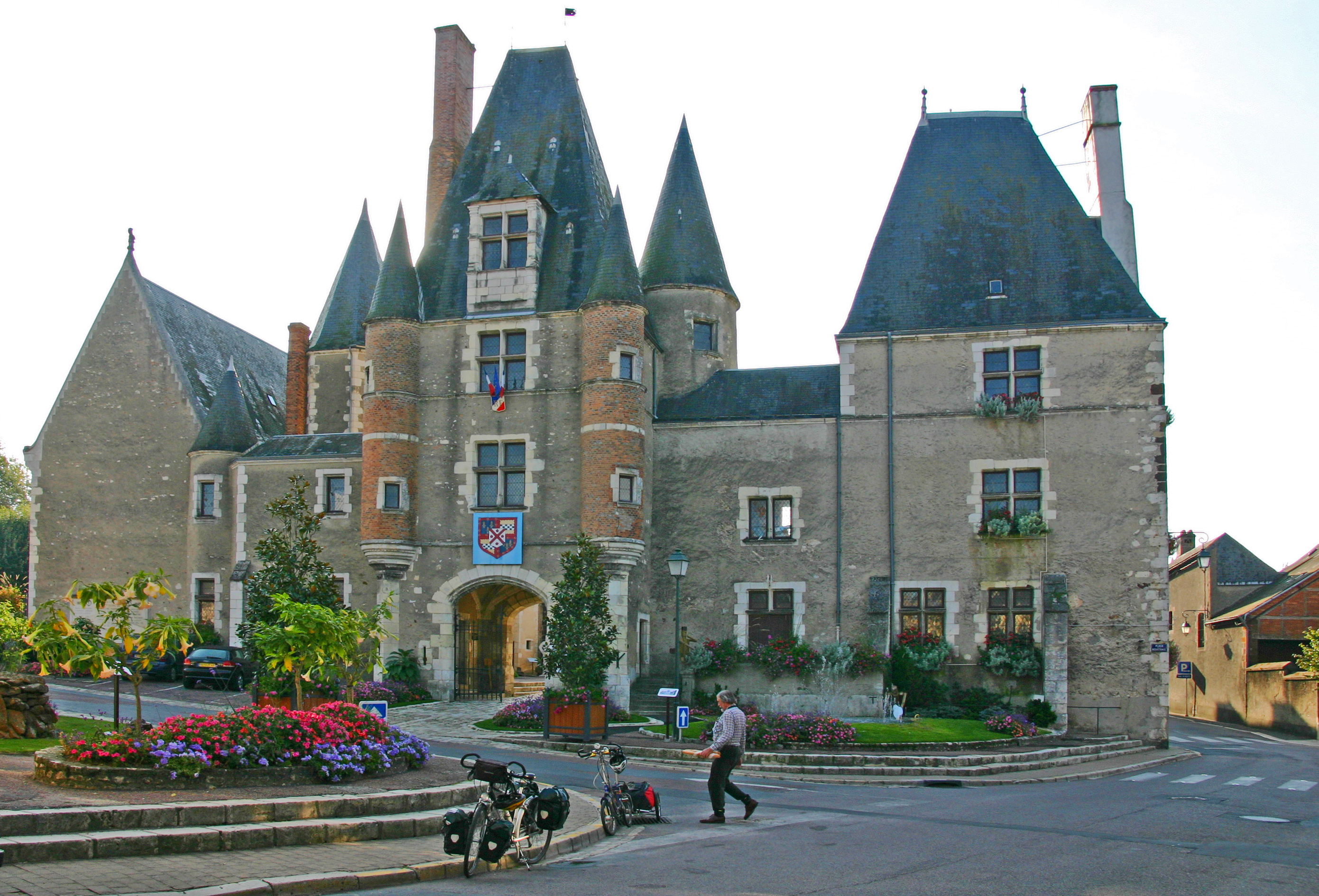
The Château d'Aubigny-sur-Nère in 2008, paternal home of Esmé Stewart, 1st Duke of Lennox, 1st Earl of Lennox. Built by Sir Robert Stewart, 4th Lord of Aubigny (c.1470–1544) and known to the French as le château des Stuarts

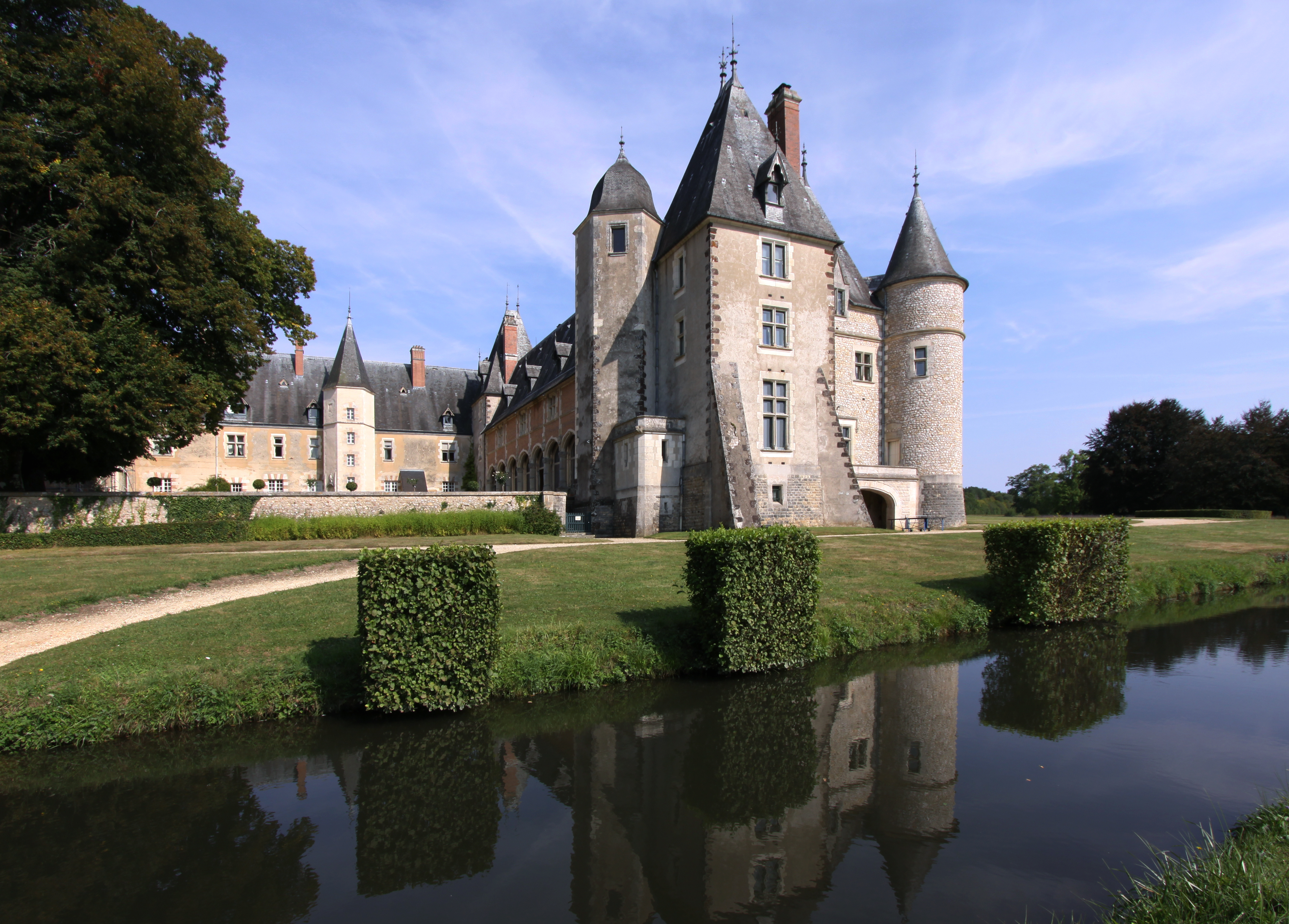
Château de la Verrerie, secondary seat of the Stewarts of Aubigny

Esmé Stewart, 1st Duke of Lennox, 1st Earl of Lennox, 6th Seigneur d'Aubigny (c. 1542 – 26 May 1583) of the Château d'Aubigny at Aubigny-sur-Nère in the ancient province of Berry, France, was a French nobleman of Scottish ancestry who, on his move to Scotland at the age of 37, became a favourite of the 13-year-old King James VI of Scotland (who was later also King James I of England). Esmé Stewart was the first cousin of James' father, Henry Stewart, Lord Darnley (son and heir apparent of Matthew Stewart, 4th Earl of Lennox). Despite his conversion from Catholicism to Calvinism he was never trusted by the Scots and returned to France where he ended his days. Sir James Melville described him as "of nature upright, just and gentle". He was the first to popularise the first name Esmé (spelt also Edme, etc.) in the British Isles.

== Early life ==
Esmé was the son and heir of John Stewart, 5th Seigneur d'Aubigny (d. 1567), by his wife Anne de la Queuille, a French noblewoman. His father was the third son of John Stewart, 3rd Earl of Lennox; his mother was the youngest daughter, and co-heiress, of François de la Queuille.

His father had inherited, through adoption from his great uncle Sir Robert Stewart, 4th Seigneur d'Aubigny (c. 1470–1544), the French Seigneurie (lordship of the manor) of Aubigny and its estates. This included the Château d'Aubigny at Aubigny-sur-Nère in the ancient province of Berry in central France, built by him, as well as the nearby secondary seat of Château de la Verrerie 14 miles away.

== Career ==
Esmè spent much of his life in France, and succeeded his father as 6th Seigneur d'Aubigny on 31 May 1567, when he was approximately 25. At the age of 37 he travelled to Scotland, where he was introduced to his first cousin-once-removed, the 13-year-old James VI of Scotland, when the latter made his formal entry into Edinburgh and began his personal rule. At first, Esmé lodged in the house of a wealthy widow Janet Fockart while lodgings were prepared for him at Holyrood Palace.

Esmé was an exotic visitor who fascinated the young James, who began to shower him with rewards and preferments. He was appointed to the Privy Council of Scotland, and on 5 March 1580, he was created Lord Darnley and Earl of Lennox (which title, having been inherited by King James from his paternal grandfather, had merged into the crown), with remainder to the heirs male of his body failing which to revert to the King. On 5 August 1581, he was created Lord Aubigny, Dalkeith, Torboltoun and Aberdour, Earl of Darnley and Duke of Lennox, with a similar remainder, as well as other favours.

Esmé Stewart was potentially able to interest James in the Catholic religion and effect cultural change at court, controlling access to the king's bedchamber. During this time, James learnt to dance and practiced French-inspired courtly riding exercises. Lennox was appointed Keeper or Master of the Wardrobe on 12 August 1581, and seems to have influenced the king's clothing choices. Esmé Stewart's rise to power was resisted by the followers of the Earl of Morton, the former Regent of Scotland. An English diplomat, Nicolas Errington, was at Stirling Castle in April 1580 when there were rumours of a palace coup. Errington reported that Esmé Stewart and his 24 armed followers barricaded themselves overnight in his rooms in the castle. Errington also noted Esmé Stewart's extravagance at court. David Calderwood later alleged that Esmé Stewart had a fund or access to money which he used to reward and recruit allies, including Agnes Keith, Countess of Moray, but this seems doubtful.

During his rise, he was careful to maintain his popularity with the Burgh administrators of Scotland's towns. For example, in July 1580 the English diplomat Robert Bowes reported that Lennox had obtained fishing rights in Aberdeen, which the deposed Regent Morton had given to his servant George Auchinleck of Balmanno, and had then arranged for the King to give this valuable source of income to the town.

James VI gave Esmé Stewart jewels that remained from the collection of Mary, Queen of Scots, including in June 1581 a gold belt or chain of knots of pearls and diamonds, and in October 1581 a gold cross with diamonds and rubies, the "Great Harry" or "Great H of Scotland", a chain of rubies and diamonds, with a diamond "carcan" necklace with roses of gold and a pair of matching hair garnishings, another suite of carcan and back and fore hair garnishings, and other pieces. The gift was witnessed by Elizabeth Stewart, Countess of Arran and James Murray, an officer of the wardrobe.

Mary, Queen of Scots, saw the benefit of Esmé Stewart as a French ally in Scotland. In January 1582 she wrote from Sheffield to the French ambassador in London Michel de Castelnau, asking him to ensure Henry III of France supported Esmé and the restoration of the Auld Alliance. Lennox became involved in Mary's plans for an "Association" that would make her and James VI joint rulers in Scotland.

In Presbyterian Scotland, the thought of a Catholic duke irked many, and Lennox had to make a choice between his Catholic faith and his loyalty to the king. Lennox chose the latter, who taught him the doctrines of Calvinism, a Presbyterian religion to which he converted. Nevertheless, the Church of Scotland remained suspicious of Lennox after his public conversion and took alarm when he had the Earl of Morton tried and beheaded on charges of treason.

=== Ruthven Raid and exile ===
In response, the Scottish nobles plotted to oust Lennox. They did so by luring James to Ruthven Castle as a guest where they kept him as a prisoner for ten months. The Lord Enterprisers then forced James to banish Lennox. A lengthy denunciation of Lennox was issued from Stirling Castle on 17 September 1582 citing his religion, association with the murderers of Henry Stuart, Lord Darnley, Regent Moray, and Regent Lennox, his control over the royal household, and supposed role in international intrigue.

Lennox stayed for a while at Dumbarton Castle and at Rothesay Castle. In December, while travelling south from Berwick on Tweed, by chance near Northallerton he encountered the French ambassador, Mothe Fénelon, who was travelling northward to treat with the Gowrie Regime. After Lennox had arrived in London, the Scottish poet William Fowler pumped him for information, which was sent on to the spy and politician Francis Walsingham.

=== Return to France and final years ===
Lennox returned to France where he started a secret correspondence with King James. He met a frosty reception in France as an apostate. Although certain Scottish nobles believed that they would be proved right in their belief that Lennox's conversion was artificial, following his return to France, he remained a Presbyterian. James sent a servant to France with a gold button from his doublet as a gift for Lennox, which he had worn next to his heart.

Lennox's final letter to James Stewart, Lord Doune, requested him to take care of his son and to recover his former possessions in Scotland for his benefit. After Lennox's death in 1583, William Schaw took his embalmed heart back to King James in Scotland. His wife and eldest son Ludovic Stewart and two of his sisters came to Scotland.

King James I had special affection for Esme; he repeatedly vouched for Lennox's religious sincerity and memorialized him in a poem called "Ane Tragedie of the Phoenix" (which compared him to an exotic bird of unique beauty killed by envy). The King in turn regarded all Lennox's family with great affection, and instructed his son King Charles I to do well by them. Charles faithfully fulfilled this obligation, and as a result, the Lennox family had considerable influence at the Scottish and English Courts over the next two generations.

== Personal life ==
Around 1572, Lennox married his mother's fourth cousin, Catherine de Balsac (d. c. 1631), the ninth daughter of Guillaume de Balsac, Sieur d'Entragues, by his wife Louise d'Humières. By Catherine he had five children:

- Lady Henrietta Stewart (1573–1642), who married George Gordon, 1st Marquess of Huntly and had issue.
- Ludovic Stewart, 2nd Duke of Lennox (1574–1624), eldest son and heir who married three times.
- Lady Marie Stewart (1576–1644) (Countess of Mar), who married John Erskine, Earl of Mar (1558–1634) and had issue.
- Esmé Stewart, 3rd Duke of Lennox (1579–1624), second son, heir to his elder brother.
- Lady Gabrielle Stewart (born 1580), a nun in Glatigny, France.

Lennox died in Paris on 26 May 1583 and was succeeded by his eldest son, Ludovic (who married three times without legitimate issue). Esme's widow outlived Lennox by many years; she spent her later life at the family estate at Aubigny, where she was largely entrusted with the upbringing of their grandchildren. She died sometime after 1630.

== Titles ==
- 31 May 1567: Seigneur d'Aubigny
- 5 March 1579/80: Earl of Lennox, Lord Darnley and Dalkeith;
- 5 August 1581: Duke of Lennox, Earl of Darnley, Lord Dalkeith, Torboltoun and Aberdour.

Peerage of Scotland
| New creation | Duke of Lennox; 1581–1583 | Succeeded by Ludovic Stewart |
| New creation | Earl of Lennox; 1580–1583 | Succeeded by Ludovic Stewart |
