= Lala (nickname) =

Lala or La La is a feminine nickname, in Spanish naming conventions it is often a hypocorism for Esmeralda. It also translates as elder brother in Pashto. It may refer to:

- Lala (footballer), full name Geraldo José dos Santos (1946–2015), Brazilian footballer
- Shahid Afridi (born 1977), Pakistani cricketer
- Lala Amarnath (1911–2000), Indian cricketer
- Mohammed Shami (born 1990), Indian cricketer
- La La Anthony (born 1979), American radio and television personality, author, businesswoman and actress
- Lalawélé Atakora (born 1990), Togolese footballer
- Dolores "LaLa" Brooks (born 1947), former member of the girl group the Crystals
- Raymond Lalonde (born 1940), American politician, retired educator
- Lauren Laverne (born 1978), British TV and radio presenter
- Lala Sjöqvist (1903–1964), Swedish diver, 1928 Olympic bronze medalist
- La Forrest 'La La' Cope, American R&B singer/songwriter, composer of "You Give Good Love"
- Varto Terian (1896–1974) Iranian actress, used LaLa as a pseudonym for stage acting.

== See also ==
- Lala (disambiguation)
- Lala (given name)
- Lala (surname)
