= Lalas =

Lalas can refer to:

People

- Alexi Lalas (born 1970), American association football defender
- Dimitrios Lalas, Greek composer and musician
- Greg Lalas (born 1973), American soccer player
- Sita Ram Lalas (1908–1986), Indian linguist and lexicographer
- Steven John Lalas (born 1953), American State Department communications officer
- Vytautas Lalas (born 1982), Lithuanian strongman competitor

Settlements

- Lalas, Elis, village in Greece, notable for the Battle of Lalas

== See also ==
- Shanghai Lalas, a 2012 book by Lucetta Kam Yip-lo
- Lala (surname)
- Lala (disambiguation)
