= List of Billboard Mainstream Top 40 number-one songs of 2005 =

This is a list of songs which reached number one on the Billboard Mainstream Top 40 chart in 2005.

During 2005, a total of 13 singles hit number-one on the charts.

== Chart history ==
Issue date	Song	Artist(s)	Ref.
January 1	"Over and Over"	Nelly featuring Tim McGraw	
January 8	"Over and Over"	Nelly featuring Tim McGraw	
January 15	"Over and Over"	Nelly featuring Tim McGraw	
January 22	"I Don't Want to Be"	Gavin DeGraw	
January 29	"Let Me Love You"	Mario	
February 5	"Let Me Love You"	Mario	
February 12	"Let Me Love You"	Mario	
February 19	"1, 2 Step"	Ciara featuring Missy Elliott	
February 26	"1, 2 Step"	Ciara featuring Missy Elliott	
March 5	"Boulevard of Broken Dreams"	Green Day	
March 12	"Boulevard of Broken Dreams"	Green Day	
March 19	"Boulevard of Broken Dreams"	Green Day	
March 26	"Boulevard of Broken Dreams"	Green Day	
April 2	"Since U Been Gone"†	Kelly Clarkson	
April 9	"Since U Been Gone"†	Kelly Clarkson	
April 16	"Since U Been Gone"†	Kelly Clarkson	
April 23	"Since U Been Gone"†	Kelly Clarkson	
April 30	"Since U Been Gone"†	Kelly Clarkson	
May 7	"Since U Been Gone"†	Kelly Clarkson	
May 14	"Since U Been Gone"†	Kelly Clarkson	
May 21	"Hollaback Girl"	Gwen Stefani	
May 28	"Hollaback Girl"	Gwen Stefani	
June 4	"Hollaback Girl"	Gwen Stefani	
June 11	"Hollaback Girl"	Gwen Stefani	
June 18	"Hollaback Girl"	Gwen Stefani	
June 25	"Hollaback Girl"	Gwen Stefani	
July 2	"We Belong Together"	Mariah Carey	
July 9	"We Belong Together"	Mariah Carey	
July 16	"We Belong Together"	Mariah Carey	
July 23	"We Belong Together"	Mariah Carey	
July 30	"We Belong Together"	Mariah Carey	
August 6	"We Belong Together"	Mariah Carey	
August 13	"We Belong Together"	Mariah Carey	
August 20	"We Belong Together"	Mariah Carey	
August 27	"We Belong Together"	Mariah Carey	
September 3	"We Belong Together"	Mariah Carey	
September 10	"Listen to Your Heart"	D.H.T. featuring Edmée	
September 17	"Listen to Your Heart"	D.H.T. featuring Edmée	
September 24	"Shake It Off"	Mariah Carey	
October 1	"Shake It Off"	Mariah Carey	
October 8	"Shake It Off"	Mariah Carey	
October 15	"Shake It Off"	Mariah Carey	
October 22	"Shake It Off"	Mariah Carey	
October 29	"Because of You"	Kelly Clarkson	
November 5	"Gold Digger"	Kanye West featuring Jamie Foxx	
November 12	"Gold Digger"	Kanye West featuring Jamie Foxx	
November 19	"Because of You"	Kelly Clarkson	
November 26	"Because of You"	Kelly Clarkson	
December 3	"Because of You"	Kelly Clarkson	
December 10	"Run It!"	Chris Brown featuring Juelz Santana	
December 17	"Run It!"	Chris Brown featuring Juelz Santana	
December 24	"Run It!"	Chris Brown featuring Juelz Santana	
December 31	"Run It!"	Chris Brown featuring Juelz Santana	

== See also ==
- 2005 in music
