= Lala (surname) =

Lala is an Albanian surname. Notable people with this surname include:

- Afzal Khan Lala (1926–2015), Pakistani politician and Pashtun nationalist
- Altin Lala (born 1975), Albanian footballer
- Fatos Lala (born 1995), Albanian footballer
- Gëzim Lala (born 1956), Albanian footballer
- Joe Lala (1947–2014), American actor and musician
- Karim Lala (1911–2002), Afghani-born founder of the Indian mafia
- Kenny Lala (born 1991), French footballer
- Kevin Neville Lala (born 1962), English evolutionary biologist
- Leonardo Lala (1906–2000), Italian writer, historian and folklorist
- Mahran Lala (born 1982), Israeli-Druze footballer
- Rauf Lala (born 1970), Pakistani comedian, actor, writer and producer

== See also ==
- Adriatik Llalla (born 1969), Albanian Prosecutor General of the Republic of Albania
- Lála, a Czech surname
- Lalas, surname
