= Lali =

Lali may refer to:

- Lali (drum), a type of drum used in Fiji
- Lali, Humla. a village and municipality in Humla District in the Karnali Zone of northwestern Nepal
- Lali, Mahakali, a village development committee in Darchula District in the Mahakali Zone of western Nepal
- Lali (tribe), a Jat clan found in Punjab, Pakistan
- Lali, Iran, a city in Khuzestan Province, Iran
- Lali County, is a county in Khuzestan Province in Iran
- Lali (album), by Lali Espósito, 2023
- Lali (film), a Pakistani Punjabi-language film

== People ==
- Lali Armengol (born 1945), Spanish playwright, professor and theater director
- Lali Singh (2008–2008), Indian girl with the diprosopus condition (two faces)
- Lali Kandelaki, Georgian ballerina
- Ali Askar Lali (born 1957), Afghan footballer
- Lali Chetwynd (born 1973), British artist
- Lali Kiknavelidze, Georgian film director
- Lali Espósito (born 1991), Argentine actress, singer, model and entrepreneur
- Lali Tsipi Michaeli (born 1964), Israeli poet

== See also ==
- Lalli (disambiguation)
- Lala (disambiguation)
- Lal (disambiguation)
