= Esmé =

- Pronunciation: /ˈɛmeɪ/, /ˈɛzmeɪ/ or /ˈɛzmiː/
- Gender: unisex

Origin
- Origin: Old French esmé (feminine esmée), "esteemed", past participle of esmer, "to esteem"
- Meaning: 1. Old French: "beloved", "esteemed" 2. Short for Esméralda

Other names
- Related names: Edmé, Esméralda, Ismi

Esmé (commonly Esme) or Esmée is a given name derived from the past participle of the Old French verb esmer, "to esteem", thus signifying "esteemed", or similarly "beloved". Originally a masculine name, Esmé had become a feminine name by the mid-twentieth century.

The name was first popularised by Esmé Stewart, 1st Duke of Lennox (1542–1583), a French nobleman of Scottish origins who returned to Scotland for part of his life. However with regard to spelling (and pronunciation), on one of his surviving letters, dated 1583, he signed himself "Amy".

Esme was among the 100 most popular baby names for girls in the UK in 2015.

Esme is also used as a short form for the Spanish feminine name Esmeralda, meaning "emerald".

== People ==
=== Women ===
- Esmè Stuart, pen name of Amélie Claire Leroy (1851–1934), English writer
- Esmé Bianco (born 1982), British actress, model, and performer
- Esmee Brugts (born 2003), Dutch footballer
- Esme Church (1893–1972), British actress and theatre director
- Esmé Creed-Miles (born 2000), English actress
- Esmée Denters (born 1988), Dutch singer
- Esmé Emmanuel (born 1947), South African tennis player
- Esmée Fairbairn, eponym of British charity the Esmée Fairbairn Foundation
- Esme Francis, Cornish musician
- Esme Grant (1920-1987), Jamaican politician
- Esmé Hooton (1914–1992), English poet
- Esme Irwin (1931–2001), British cricket player
- Esmé Kamphuis (born 1983), Dutch bobsledder
- Esme Langley (1919–1991), British writer
- Esme Mackinnon (1913-1999), British skier
- Esme Melville (1918–2006), Australian actress
- Esmé Patterson (born 1985), American musician
- Esme Morgan (born 2000), English footballer
- Esme Roberts (1911–1995), British artist
- Esme Steyn (born 1953), South African lawn bowler
- Esme Timbery (1931–2023), Australian Bidjigal artist and shellworker
- Esme Tombleson (1917–2010), New Zealand politician
- Esmé Wiegman (born 1975), Dutch politician
- Esmé Wynne-Tyson (1898–1972), English actress and writer
- Esme Young (born 1949), English fashion designer

=== Men ===
- Esmé Collings (1859–1936), English photographer, miniaturist and early film pioneer
- Esmé Gordon (1910–1993), Scottish architect
- Esme Haywood (1900–1985), English cricketer
- Esmé Howard, 1st Baron Howard of Penrith (1863–1939), British diplomat, Ambassador to the United States
- Esme Mends (born 1986), Ghanaian footballer
- Esme Percy (1887–1957), British actor
- Esmé Stewart, 1st Duke of Lennox (1542–1583), Scottish earl of French descent
- Esmé Stewart, 3rd Duke of Lennox (1579–1624), Scottish nobleman, younger son of the above
- Esmé Stewart, 2nd Duke of Richmond, 5th Duke of Lennox (1649–1660), Scottish duke, grandson of 3rd Duke of Lennox
- Esmé Cecil Wingfield-Stratford (1882–1971), English historian and writer

== Fictional characters ==
- Esmé Amarinth, in the novel The Green Carnation
- Esme Cuckoo, a mutant in the Marvel Universe
- Esme Cullen, a vampire in the Twilight series
- Esme Danvers-Olsen, in Supergirl season 6
- Esmé Howe-Nevinson, in the 1957 Elizabeth Taylor novel Angel
- Esmé Kipps, in the Susan Hill novel The Woman in Black
- Esme Lennox, eponymous heroine of the 2006 Maggie O'Farrell novel The Vanishing Act of Esme Lennox
- Esme Macknade, in the BBC Radio 4 First World War drama Home Front
- Esme Murray, in the sitcom Hamish Macbeth
- Esme Nicoll, protagonist of the novel The Dictionary of Lost Words by Pip Williams
- Birth mother of Anna Preston in the novel When Marnie Was There
- Esme Prince, in the soap opera General Hospital
- Esme Shelby, in the TV series Peaky Blinders
- Esme Song, in the Canadian teen drama Degrassi: Next Class
- Esmé Squalor, a villainess in the novel A Series of Unfortunate Events
- Esme Vanderheusen, in the soap opera Passions
- Esme Watson, in the Australian TV series A Country Practice
- Esme Weatherwax, witch in the Discworld fantasy novel series
- a title character in Esme & Roy, an animated children's television series
- Esme, in the 1955 William Gaddis novel The Recognitions
- Esmé, in the J. D. Salinger short story "For Esmé – with Love and Squalor"
- Esmé, a murderous hyena in a story by Saki
- Esme, boa constrictor in the movie Foul Play
