= July 7 Patriot Front =

The July 7 Patriot Front (Frente Patriota 7 de Julio) or July 7 Movement, is a subversive right-wing paramilitary movement of Costa Rica that operated for several months in the northern part of the country advocating for a coup d'état against the President of Costa Rica Carlos Alvarado Quesada and the Legislative Assembly. The group came to public notice after a Facebook video was widely shared in which masked and armed members called for the overthrowing of Costa Rica's government. Judicial authorities reacted and the Organismo de Investigación Judicial quickly identified the spokesperson's voice and location, arresting three suspects all with previous convictions for various crimes.

== Video ==
On July 7, 2019, the group released a video on social media taking advantage of a pro-government demonstration that same day, and congratulating the focus of trade unions and student protests in recent days. Who allegedly would be the group's leader Alvaro Sequeira Mendiola calls on the Public Force and the general population to take up arms against the government of Carlos Alvarado Quesada and the deputies of the Legislative Assembly of Costa Rica, threatening to send the former into exile not to resign voluntarily.

The video was condemned both by the President of the Republic, Carlos Alvarado, and by the main opposition party, the National Liberation Party. However, others such as the lawyer and right-wing presidential candidate Juan Diego Castro rejected the veracity of the video and accused the government of being behind it, claims that were proven false.

== Captures ==
The government of Costa Rica filed an official complaint with the Public Prosecutor for the crimes of sedition and mutiny, contemplated in the Costa Rican Criminal Code as creditors of sentences of up to four years in prison. In a joint work of the Ministry of Public Security by Michael Soto Rojas, the Directorate of Intelligence and Security led by Eduardo Trejos Lalli and the Judicial Investigation Agency directed by Wálter Espinoza, it was possible to identify by voice the authors of the video, who had a criminal record. The group was coordinated through a WhatsApp group.

The video was recorded in La Españolita de Santa Rita in a farm and Christian center called "La Trinidad" belonging to Masís and used as a place for religious meetings.

Mendiola who is known by the alias "Captain Carabina" and "Captain Miguel" has a long-lasting activity in subversive groups including the terrorist organization "Armed Wing of the People" and was a candidate for mayor of Aserrí in the far-right Evangelical Christian party Costa Rican Renewal. Mendiola has a pending sentence of twelve years in prison for illicit association, fraud and illegal carrying of arms. His stepson and co-accused Jeffrey Gabriel Fernández Ramírez has a record of deprivation of liberty, damages and attempted homicide. Masís, who supplied the premises where they met and where explosives, weapons and drugs were found, was previously convicted for his crimes as commander of the Cobra Command that killed two indigenous peasants and raped two women of the same ethnic group. He was arrested while on his property with Costa Rican pro-Palestinian activist Tatiana Gamboa Freer who rose to fame for his expulsion from Israel. Gamboa is not included among the suspects of belonging to the group. Masís had to be hospitalized due to health problems caused by the tension during the raid and arrest.

The suspects were given three months of preventive detention as requested by the Office of Drug Trafficking and Related Offenses.
