= Navtej Bharati =

Punjabi Canadian poet (born 1938)

Navtej Bharti
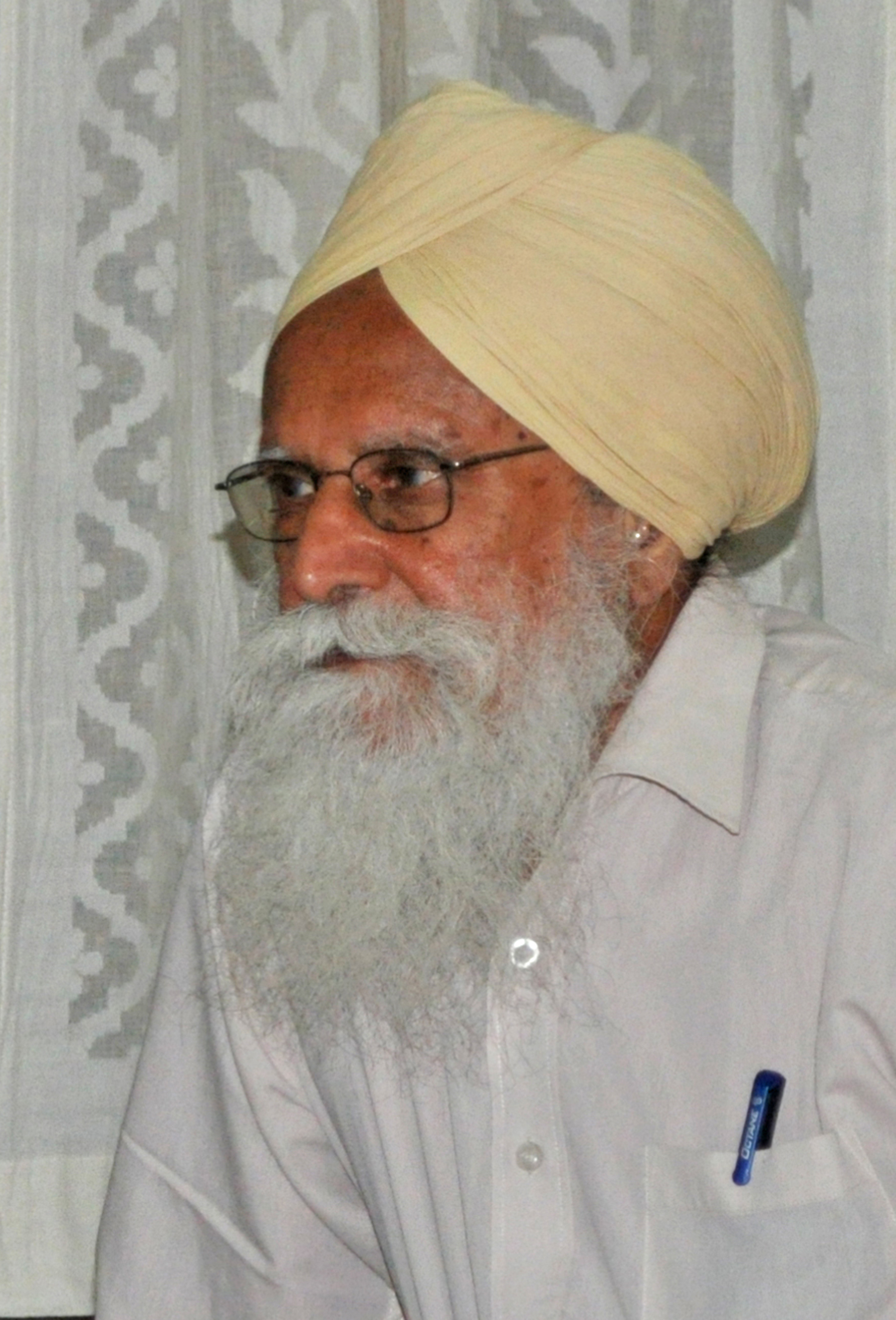
- Born: 5 February 1938 (age 88); Rode, Moga, Punjab, British India
- Occupation: Poet
- Spouse: Surinder Kaur
- Writing career
- Language: Punjabi
- Notable work: Leela

Navtej Bharati (Punjabi: ਨਵਤੇਜ ਭਾਰਤੀ) is one of the most well-known Punjabi poets living in Canada. Born and brought up in Rode village near Moga in Punjab, India, he moved to Canada in 1960s. He now lives in London, Ontario, with his wife Surinder Kaur. They have two children, a son Subodh and daughter Sumeet.

Bharati has published books in Punjabi and English. He was the publisher of Third Eye Press, whose books covered many genres.

His book Leela (ਲੀਲਾ), co-authored with his brother Ajmer Rode, is more than 1000 pages long and is considered one of the most important Punjabi poetry works of the twentieth century.

In 2012, he wrote a long poem Lali (ਲਾਲੀ), based on the iconic character of Prof Hardiljeet Singh who taught in Punjabi University, Patiala and was known as 'Lali'. The book was also a tribute to the legendary Bhootwara (ghost house) in Patiala that was a centre of intellectual activities involving Lali among others with Sutinder Singh Noor, Gurbhagat Singh, Harinder Singh Mehboob, Prem Pali, Amarjit Sathi, Surjit Lee, and Kulwant Grewal besides Bharati.

Bharati's English-language poetry book, Endless Eye, was published by the Canadian Poetry Association.

While living in India, Bharati was a three-time winner (1959, 1960, 1961) of the Best Poet of the State award, given by the Punjab Languages Department. In 2003, he was given the Best Overseas Author Award by the Languages Department. In 2010, Navtej Bharati received Anād Kāv Sanmān carrying a citation and cash prize of Rs 2.5 lakh.

== Bibliography ==
=== Poetry ===
- Simbal De Phul - 1968
- Leela - 1999, 2019 (with Ajmer Rode)
- Endless Eye - 2002
- Lali - 2012
- Othon trek - 2016, 2019

=== Prose ===
- Puth Sidh - 2019
