= Lala River =

Lala River may refer to:

- Lala, a tributary of the Bistrița in Bistrița-Năsăud County, Romania
- Lala River (Moldova), a tributary of the Moldova River in Romania
- Lala River (Luza), a tributary of the Luza River in Russia

== See also ==
- Lala (disambiguation)
