= Lala (given name) =

Lala (Persian: لالا ) is a given name derived from Persian word for calling someone as elder brother for respecting. It may refer to:

- Lance Naik Lala (1876–1927), Indian recipient of the Victoria Cross
- Lala Deen Dayal (1844–1905), Indian photographer
- Lala Fazal-ur-Rehman, Pakistani politician, appointed administrator of Karachi District in 2010
- Lala Hansraj Gupta (died 1985), Indian educationist and mayor of Delhi
- Lala Hsu (born 1984), Taiwanese singer-songwriter
- Lala Karmela (born 1985), Indonesian singer-songwriter
- Lala Ram Ken (1931–2007), Indian politician
- Lala Kramarenko (born 2004), Russian rhythmic gymnast
- Lala Mara (1931–2004), Fijian chief, wife of Kamisese Mara, founding father of modern Fiji
- Lala Meredith-Vula (born 1966), Kosovan artist and photographer
- Lala Mnatsakanyan (born 1957), Armenian actress
- Lala Pasquinelli, Argentine artist, poet, lawyer and activist
- Lala Lajpat Rai (1865–1928), Indian author and politician
- Lala Achint Ram (1898–1961), Indian freedom fighter and politician
- Lala Shri Ram (1884–1963), Indian businessman
- Lala Abdul Rashid (1922–1989), Pakistani field hockey goalkeeper
- Lala Shevket (born 1951), Azerbaijani politician, former Secretary of State of Azerbaijan
- Lala Sloatman (born 1970), American actress and model
- Lala Sukuna (1888–1958), Fijian chief, scholar, soldier and statesman
- Lala Yusifova (born 1996), Azerbaijani retired rhythmic gymnast

== Fictional characters ==
- Lala Hagoromo

== See also ==
- Lalla (disambiguation)
