= Ajmer Rode =

Canadian author writing in Punjabi

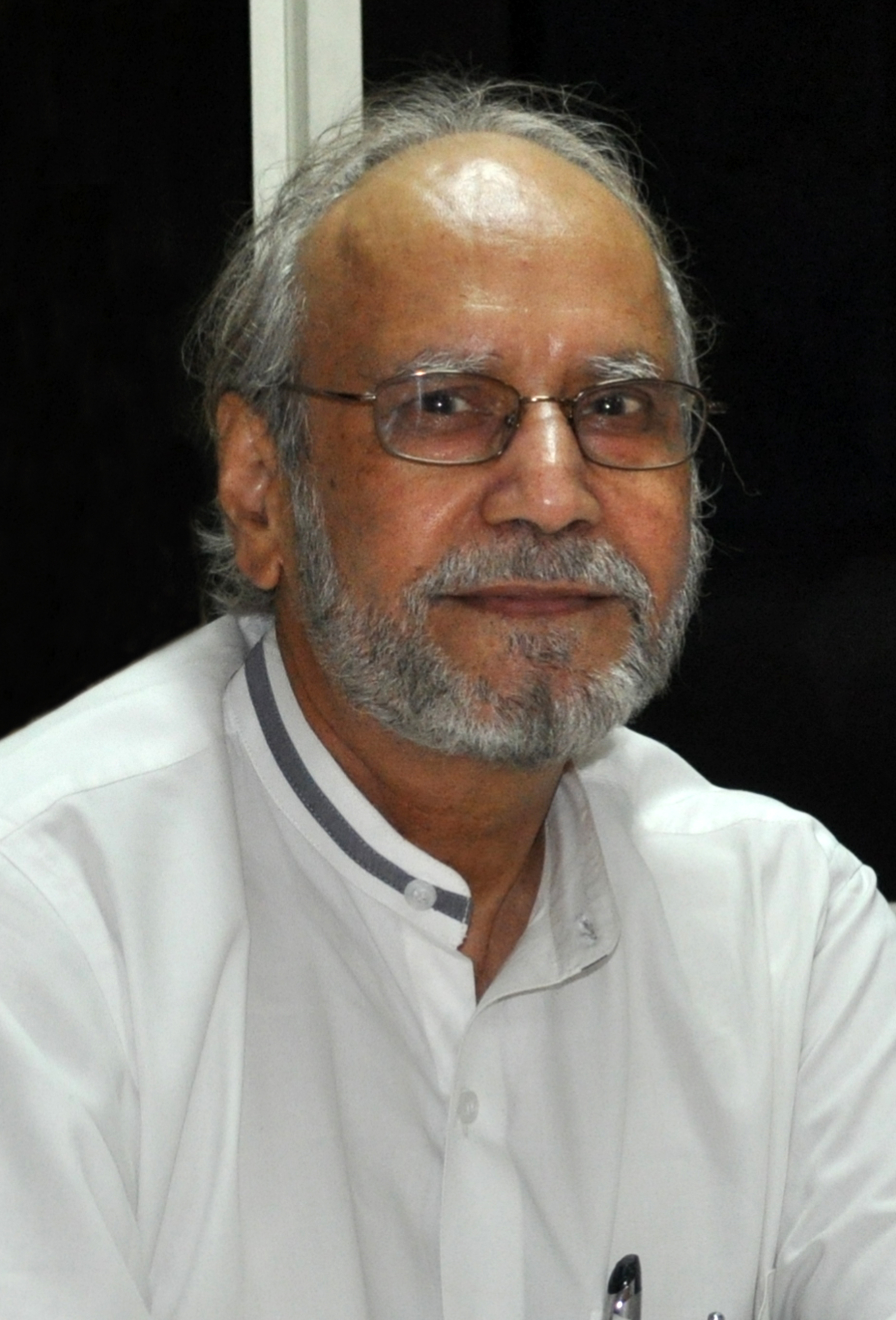
Ajmer Rode

Ajmer Rode is a Canadian author writing in Punjabi as well as in English. His first work was non-fiction Vishva Di Nuhar on Albert Einstein's Relativity in dialogue form inspired by Plato's Republic. Published by the Punjabi University in 1966, the book initiated a series of university publications on popular science and sociology. Rode's first poetry book Surti influenced by science and philosophical explorations was experimental and in words of critic Dr. Attar Singh 'has extended the scope of Punjabi language and given a new turn to Punjabi poetry'. His most recent poetry book Leela, more than 1000 pages long and co-authored with Navtej Bharati, is counted among the outstanding Punjabi literary works of the twentieth century.

Rode is regarded the founder of Punjabi theatre in Canada. He wrote and directed the first Punjabi play Dooja Passa dealing with racism faced by minorities. This was followed by his full-length play Komagata Maru based on a significant racial incident in British Columbia's history. Though it lacked professional direction the play generated considerable publicity inspiring theatrical interests in the Indian-Canadian community. Komagata Maru is the first full-length Punjabi play written in Canada. His most recent English play Rebirth of Gandhi was produced at Surrey Arts Centre Canada) in 2004 to a full house.

Among Rode's significant translation is The Last Flicker an English rendering of a modern Punjabi classic novel Marhi Da Diva by Gurdial Singh who recently won the Gyan Peeth, India's highest literary award. The translation was published by the Indian Academy of Letters in 1993. Currently Rode is member of an international team of translators rendering Sufi songs from Urdu, Punjabi and Hindi into English; the project based in Los Angeles aims to produce a large multilingual book of original and translated songs sung by late Nusrat Fateh Ali Khan, the legendary Sufi singer of the twentieth century.

An active member of the Writers' Union of Canada, Ajmer Rode was on its national council in 1994 and later chaired its Racial Minority Writers Committee; Currently he is co-ordinator of Vancouver's Punjabi Writers Forum, the oldest and influential Punjabi writers association in Canada. He has been founding member of several other Indian-Canadian literary and performing arts associations including Watno Dur Art Foundation, and India Music Society founded to promote classical Indian music in North America. He was the first secretary of Samaanta, an organization to oppose violence against women and is now on the advisory board of Chetna, a Vancouver-based organization promoting minority rights and opposing Casteism. He has served on Canada Council and British Columbia Arts Council juries to award literary grants.

Rode was given the Best Overseas Punjabi Author award by the Punjab Languages Dept, India in 1994. Guru Nanak Dev University honored him with the "Prominent Citizen (literature)" award and the G.N. Engg. College with the "Poet of Life" award the same year. In Canada he has been honored with awards for Punjabi theatre and translation.

== Original works ==
- Vishava Di Nuhar, prose, Punjabi University, Patiala, 1966
- Dooja Passa, one act plays, 1981
- Komagata Maru, full-length play, 1983, 1999, 2013, ISBN 1-897203-14-4
- Blue Meditations, poetry, 1985, ISBN 0-919581-31-5
- Poems at My Doorstep, poetry, 1990, 2017, ISBN 978-1-77171-233-0
- Surti, poetry, 1989, 1979, ISBN 0-919581-59-5
- Shubhchintan, poetry, 1993, 2012, ISBN 978-81-906611-8-8
- Leela, poetry, 1999 ISBN 0-9690504-9-6
- Nirlajj, drama, Aesthetics Publications, India, 2008
- Pash Da Sath, prose, 2016, published by WEB, Patiala ISBN 978-93-85670-48-0
- Balbir Singh Bhangu (Life and Music), Libros Libertad, Surrey, 2015, ISBN 978-1-926763-39-2
- Selected Poems, Third Eye Publications, London, 2003, 2006, 2010, 2017, ISBN 0-919581-76-5
- Chonvi Kavita, poems, Third Eye Publications, London, 2003, 2006, 2010, 2017, ISBN 0-919581-86-2
- A Journey With The Endless Eye, Ekstasis Editions Canada Ltd., 2014, ISBN 978-1-77171-077-0

== Drama ==
=== Plays written and directed ===
- Dooja Passa (one-act play)
- One Girl One Dream (one-act play)
- Visa (one-act play)
- Komagata Maru (full-length play)
- One Girl One Dream (movie script)
- Nirlajj (full-length play)
- Chetna (co-author), Third Eye publications
- Turi Wala Kotha (direction), Stair to Nowhere (reading),
- The Fragrant Grass (full-length, unpublished, readings)
- Rebirth of Gandhi (full-length play in English)
- Village of Men (6 TV scripts in English and Punjabi),

produced by Abbotsford Community Services, 2007

== Translations ==
- The Last Flicker, Novel, 1993
- Desire, poems, 1999
- One Hundred One Surrealist Poems, 1996
- Bird Talk, children's story 2001
- Calendar Poems, poems, 2003
- Dukh Sukh, poems, 2005

== Editing ==
- Punjabi Poetry of Canada, co-edited, 1980
- Canadian Punjabi issue of the Preet Lari, 1986
- Munch Katha, co-edited, 2002
- Om Parkash, 2005
