= Bernard Stewart, 3rd Lord of Aubigny =

French general

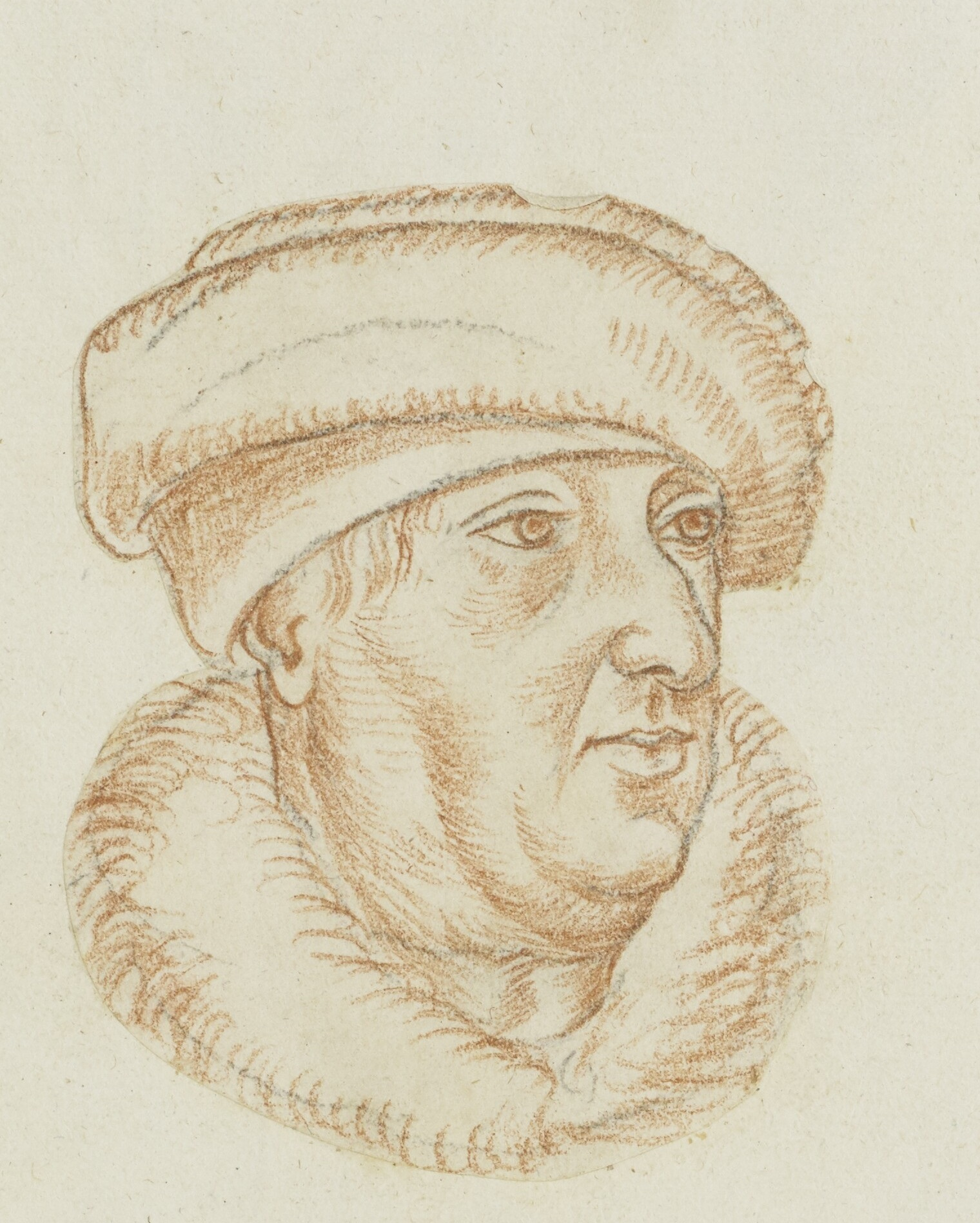
- Born: 1452
- Died: 1508; Corstorphine
- Occupations: Soldier, diplomat, commandant
- Spouse(s): Anne de Maumont, Comtesse de Beaumont-le-Roger, Guillemette de Boucard
- Children: Anne Stuart, Comtesse de Beaumont-le-Roger, Guyonne Stuart
- Parents: John Stewart, 2nd Lord of Aubigny (father); Beatrix d'Apchier (mother)
- Awards: Knight of the Order of Saint Michael

Arms of Bernard Stewart, 4th Seigneur d'Aubigny, as seen sculpted at the Château de la Verrerie, built by him

Bernard Stewart, 3rd Seigneur d'Aubigny and 3rd Seigneur Concressault (French: Bérault Stuart; c. 1447 – 15 June 1508) was a French soldier, commander of the Garde Écossaise, and diplomat belonging to the Scottish family of Stewart of Darnley.

== Early life ==
Bernard was the grandson of Sir John Stewart of Darnley, who was given the lands of Aubigny-sur-Nere and Concressault by Charles VII of France for his service during the Hundred Years' War. Like his father and grandfather he was high in favour with the French King and was chosen as commander of the royal bodyguard. Because of his family background he was chosen as the envoy to James III of Scotland to announce the accession of King Charles VIII of France. He was also given the task of signing a treaty with the Scots renewing the Auld Alliance, which he proceeded to sign on 13 March 1484.

He became Captain of the Scottish Archers of the Guard in 1493 and for the next forty years, he took part in the wars of Charles VIII, Louis XII, and Francis I in Italy.

== Italian wars ==
In 1494, Charles VIII of France laid claim to the Kingdom of Naples and sent the Lord of Aubigny to Rome to press his claims to Pope Alexander VI. When Alexander refused to recognize Charles' claim to Naples the king raised an army of 25,000 men (including 8,000 Swiss mercenaries) and began his descent into Italy. Stewart received orders from Charles VIII to lead one thousand of the king's cavalry over the Alps and into Lombardy and after taking part with Charles in the conquest of Romagna accompanied him in the triumphal entry into Florence on 15 November 1494. After this victory Stewart was made governor of Calabria and lieutenant-general of the French army.

The French quickly overran the disunited Italian peninsula and arrived in Naples on 21 February 1495, King Ferdinand II of Naples having fled to Sicily at the arrival of the French army. There, in temporary exile, Ferdinand joined his cousin Ferdinand II of Aragon King of Spain and Sicily who offered him assistance to regain his kingdom. In response to Charles' invasion the League of Venice was created, which threatened to cut the invading army off in the south while the league occupied the north cutting the line of communications and supply. On 30 May 1495, Charles split his army taking half of his troops northward to fight their way back into France and leaving the rest to hold the recently conquered Neapolitan territories. After hard fighting at the Battle of Fornovo, Charles and most of the French army made it safely back to France leaving Stewart and the rest of the army to fight off the expected Spanish invasion.

The Spanish general Gonzalo Fernández de Córdoba was dispatched from Spain with an army to reinforce the king of Naples. On 24 May 1495, he arrived in the port of Messina in Sicily, only to find that Ferdinand had already crossed over into Calabria with an army and had reoccupied Reggio. De Córdoba himself crossed over to Calabria two days later. He had under his command 600 lances of Spanish cavalry, many of these light jinetes, and 1,500 infantry, many of them Rodeleros swordsmen, to which were added 3,500 soldiers from the Spanish fleet. The size of the Neapolitan army is unclear, but soon was supplemented by 6,000 volunteers from Calabria, who joined the Neapolitan ranks when Ferdinand of Naples landed. De Córdoba's Spanish contingent was further depleted because he needed to put Spanish garrisons in several fortified places which Ferdinand turned over to Spain in partial compensation for the military aid Spain was providing. Although he was seriously ill with malaria which he had recently contracted, Aubigny lost no time in responding to the allied challenge, quickly consolidating his forces to confront the Neapolitan/Spanish invasion by calling in isolated garrisons throughout Calabria and requesting that Précy reinforce him with the Swiss mercenaries. In the following Battle of Seminara the Spanish and Neapolitan armies were routed by the French cavalry and Swiss pikemen led by the Scotsman Aubigny.

Stewart also took part in the 1499 campaign of King Louis XII of France and upon its successful conclusion was made Governor of Milan with command of the French army that was left behind by the king to garrison the towns of northern Italy. In 1501 he completed the conquest of Naples and was appointed Governor. However, after a few successes in Calabria, he was completely defeated at the second Battle of Seminara (1503) and became a prisoner at the Castel Nuovo in Naples until he was released by a truce signed on 11 November 1503.

== Later life ==
The French king made him a member of the Order of St Michael. In 1508, he was sent as ambassador to consult King James IV of Scotland about the marriage of Princess Claude of France with the future King Francis I of France. King James IV hailed him as the 'Father of War.' It was as a result of this mission that Aubigny became the subject of two ballads by William Dunbar, "The Ballad of Lord Bernard Stewart" and "Elegy on the Death of Lord Bernard Stewart". He was a judge at the tournament of the Wild Knight and the Black Lady. After this event, Bernard set out a pilgrimage to Whithorn, but fell ill and died near Edinburgh at Corstorphine on 11 June 1508.

He is buried in the aisle of Corstorphine church. The grave is said to have had a cross of fine gold. Its presence (in French "Cruce D'or Fin") giving the name to the area. However, in his will, Bernard Stewart asked to buried at the Observant Franciscans in Edinburgh and his heart at Whithorn.

He was the author of a book on military science, Traité sur l'Art de la Guerre, dictated in Scotland to his secretary Étienne le jeune. The text was published in 1976.

== Marriage and titles ==
He married firstly Guillemette de Boucard, secondly Anne de Maumont (died after 1510), Countess of Beaumont-le-Roger, becoming Count (Jure uxoris) of Beaumont-le-Roger. He was granted the titles of Count of Arena, Marquis of Squillace, Marquis of Girace and Duke of Terranuova in the Kingdom of Naples by Louis XII in 1502.

Béraud left two children; Guyonne (wife of Phillipe de Bracque) by Guillemette de Boucard, and Anne (wife of her first cousin Robert Stewart) by Anne de Maumont.
