= Esmeralda (given name) =

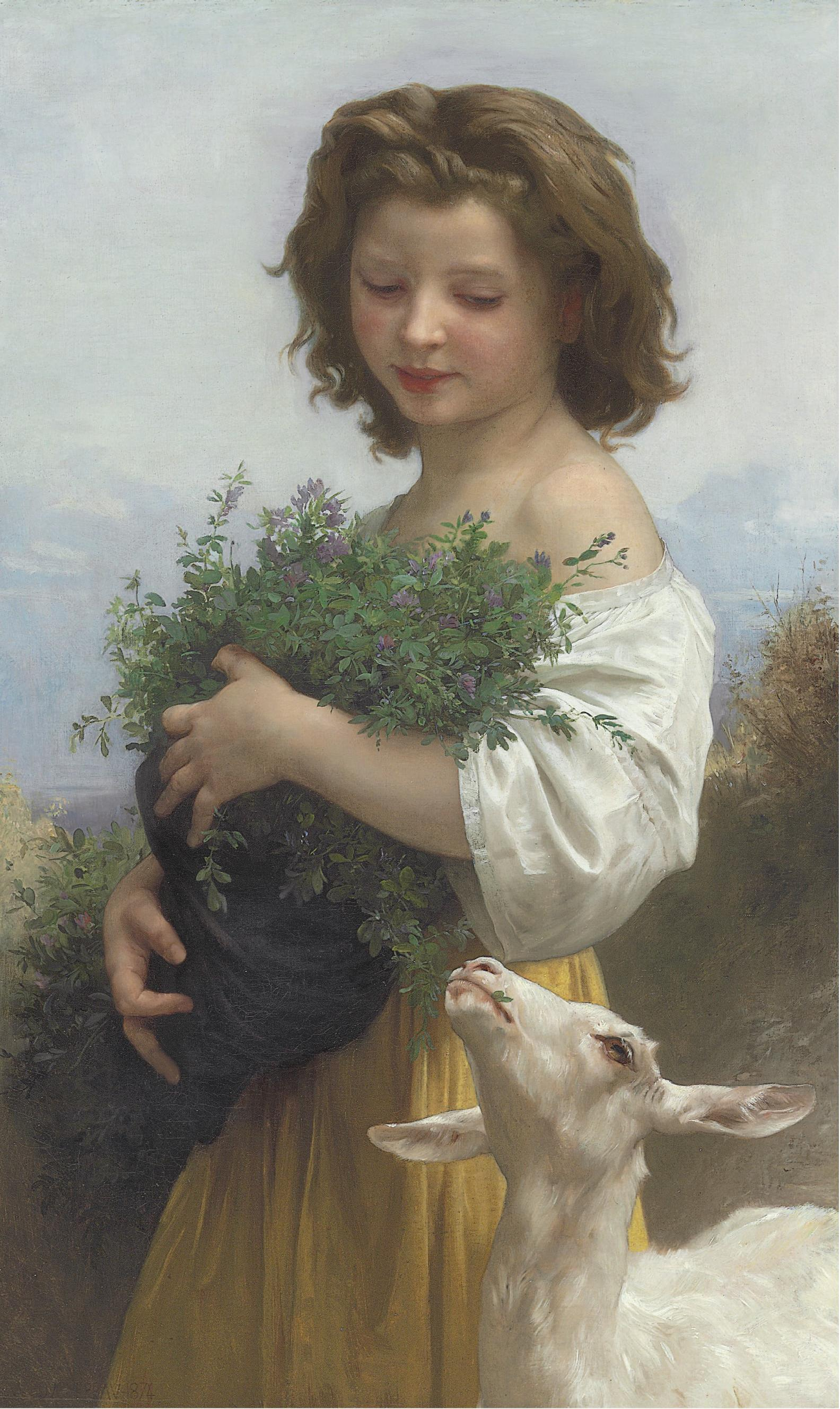
- La Petite Esméralda by William Adolphe Bouguereau
- Gender: Feminine

Origin
- Origin: Portuguese, Spanish
- Meaning: emerald
- Region of origin: Spain, Portugal

Other names
- Nicknames: Lala, Esme, Esmee
- Related names: Emerald, Esméralda

Esmeralda is a feminine given name of Portuguese and Spanish origin meaning emerald. The name was used for a Roma character in The Hunchback of Notre-Dame, an 1831 novel by Victor Hugo that has been dramatized on film and screen and also brought the name to the attention of people in the English-speaking world. Esméralda is a French version of the name.

== Popularity ==
The name has consistently ranked among the top 100 names for girls in Mexico over the last century and is also well-used for girls in Spain. The name has ranked among the top 1,000 names for girls in the United States, a country with a sizable population of Spanish speakers, since 1951 and among the top 500 names since 1973. The name was at its most popular for American girls in the late 1990s and early 2000s, when it was ranked among the top 200 names for girls. Its popularity coincided with the release of the 1996 Disney film The Hunchback of Notre Dame.

== People with the given name ==
- Princess Marie-Esméralda of Belgium (Esméralda de Réthy, born 1956), Belgian royalty
- Esmeralda Calabria (born 1964), Italian producer, screenwriter
- Esmeralda Cervantes (1861–1926), Spanish harpist
- Esmeralda Devlin (born 1971), British stage and costume designer
- Esmeralda de Jesus Garcia (born 1959), Brazilian track and field athlete
- Esmeralda Mallada (born 1937), Uruguayan astronomer and professor
- Esmeralda Mitre (born 1982), Argentine actress
- Esmeralda Moya (born 1985), Spanish actress
- Esmeralda Negron (born 1983) Puerto Rican coach and retired footballer
- Esmeralda Pimentel (born 1989), Mexican actress
- Esmeralda Rego de Jesus Araujo, known as Sister Esmeralda (born 1959 or 60), East Timorese nun and resistance activist
- Princess Esmeralda Ruspoli (1928–1988), Italian actress and aristocrat
- Esmeralda Santiago (born 1948), Puerto Rican author and actress
- Esmeralda Ugalde (born 1991), Mexican actress
- Esmeralda Yaniche (born 1991), Venezuelan model and pageant titleholder

== See also ==
- Esmé, given name sometimes used as a nickname for Esmeralda
