= Lal (disambiguation) =

Lal is a surname and a given name.

Lal or LAL may also refer to:

== Places ==
- Lal wa Sarjangal, Afghanistan
- Lal-e Tazehabad, Iran

== People ==
- Lal (actor), stage name of Indian film actor, producer and director M. P. Michael (born 1958)
- Lal Jr., stage name of Indian director Jean Paul Lal (born 1988), son of M. P. Michael
- Lal Bahadur Shastri (1904–1966), Indian prime minister from 1964 to 1966
- Lal Krishna Advani (born 1927), Indian politician, former deputy prime minister (2002–2004)
- Lal Waterson (1943–1998), British musician
- Jawahar Lal Nehru, Indian politician and statesman who served as the first prime minister of India

== Other uses ==
- LAL (band), a Canadian electronic/house/world musician collective
- Lal, a fictional character in "The Offspring" (Star Trek: The Next Generation)
- Lalor railway station, Melbourne
- Lanka Ashok Leyland, a Sri Lanka truck manufacturer
- Licence Art Libre, or Free Art Licence
- Lightning activity level, a six-point scale measuring the amount of lightning produced by a thunderstorm
- Limulus amebocyte lysate, an aqueous extract of blood cells from the Atlantic horseshoe crab
- Livonia, Avon and Lakeville Railroad, New York, U.S.
- Air Labrador, a Canadian airline, ICAO airline designator LAL
- Lakeland Linder International Airport, Florida, U.S., FAA airport code LAL
- Los Angeles Lakers, a professional basketball team

== See also ==
- Lal Lal, Victoria, Australia
- Lala (disambiguation)
- Lal Bal Pal, a group of three nationalists in British-ruled India
- Laal (disambiguation)
- Lali (disambiguation)
