= Arneae =

Human settlement

Coordinates: 36°26′31″N 29°52′17″E

Arneae or Arneai (Ancient Greek: Ἀρνεαί) was a small city of ancient Lycia mentioned by Capito in his Isaurica. It is located near Ernez, Antalya province of Turkey, in the interior of Lycia where archaeological remains have been found.

== Bishopric ==
Since it was in the Roman province of Lycia, the bishopric of Arneae was a suffragan of the metropolitan see of Myra, the province's capital. No name of any of its bishops is identified in Le Quien's Oriens christianus in quatuor Patriarchatus digestus. However, the see appears in ninth place among the suffragans of Arneae in the Notitiae Episcopatuum of Pseudo-Epiphanius, composed under Byzantine Emperor Heraclius in about 640.

No longer a residential bishopric, Arneae is today listed by the Catholic Church as a titular see.

== Notable residents ==
- Lalla of Arneae, first century
