= Laal =

Laal or LAAL may be,

- Laal language, unclassified language of Chad
- Laal (band), Pakistani band
- Laal (film), 2019 Pakistani television film
- Living Archive of Aboriginal Languages, Australia

== See also ==
- Lal (disambiguation)
- Lala (disambiguation)
