= Lalan, Isfahan =

Lalan لالان
- Village
- Location within Iran
- Coordinates: 33°33′24″N 50°20′16″E
- Country: Iran
- Province: Isfahan
- County: Golpayegan
- Bakhsh: Central
- Rural District: Kenarrudkhaneh

Population (2006)
  - Total: 83
- Time zone: UTC+3:30 (IRST)
  - Summer (DST): UTC+4:30 (IRDT)

Lalan (Persian: لالان, also Romanized as Lālān) is a village in Kenarrudkhaneh Rural District, in the Central District of Golpayegan County, Isfahan Province, Iran. At the 2006 census, its population was 83, in 20 families.
