= Lallation =

Lallation may refer to:

- A developmental stage in infantile speech from around 7–8 months when a child repeats (often incorrectly) sounds they have heard
- A difficulty with enunciation which makes l sound like r (see lambdacism) or vice versa (see rhotacism)
