= Les+ Magazine =

Chinese LGBTQ magazine

Les+
- April 2011 cover
- Founder: Jing Zhao
- Founded: 2005
- Country: China
- Based in: Beijing, China

Les+ Magazine is a Beijing-based community magazine. It was started in 2005 by a group of young Chinese lesbians, or lalas (Chinese: 拉拉; pinyin: lālā). Les+ is the first magazine for queer women in China, which has a growing lesbian culture. Its publication was suspended in 2015.

== Origins ==
Jing Zhao was one of the women who founded Les+ in 2005, China's first and only queer women's magazine. The magazine surfaced from the growing online culture of forums and chatrooms in China in the 2000s. In 1999, the first online lala forum was created.

The Les+ group was named after the Les+ magazine they created – the first and the only lesbian magazine to date in mainland China. This magazine was initiated by two lesbian women in their twenties. They met on the Internet in 2003 and started Les+ one year later in order to enable each of their girlfriends to develop confidence in their relationships. Les+’s activities, including magazine production, are run in members’ leisure-time without payment. All the costs were supported by local and overseas foundations.

— Jing Fan, Reaching out for the lala identity: a case study of a lesbian magazine and community making in Beijing, China

The slogan on the cover of the first issue states: "After the darkness fades away, I’ll be holding your hand, walking under the sunlight with pride, boldly and happily living our lives!".

== Lesbian culture in China ==
Although homosexuality has been legal in China since 1997, LGBT people continue to face social oppression and are not protected from discrimination by law. According to Xin Huang, Les+ exists within a growing lesbian culture: "In 2007 when I conducted the fieldwork for this research, lesbians in China have a national organization, Tongyu, their own magazine, Les+, and a club called lala, which holds weekly meetings in some large cities, as well as a lala website."
