= Esme Roberts =

British artist (1911–1995)

Robina Esme Roberts (13 December 1911 – 1995) was a British artist, best known for her poster designs.

== Early life ==
She was born on 13 December 1911 (or possibly 8 December 1912), and raised in Sleaford, Lincolnshire. Roberts trained in Vienna and Munich.

== Career ==
Roberts created book covers, illustrations and Art Deco designs. Many examples of her work are on show in the Sleaford Museum.

Her 1934 and 1935 Art Deco posters advertising steamer cruises to the Royal Docks are in the permanent collection of the London Transport Museum.

== Personal life ==
In 1939, she married George Gordon Jeudwine (1913–1954) in Kensington, London, and they moved to Rauceby, Lincolnshire. He was the son of George Gordon Jeudwine and Alice Mildred Phelps, and the grandson of George Wynne Jeudwine (1849–1933). On his death on 20 October 1954, he was a solicitor of Peake, Snow & Jeudwine, 5 Market Street, Sleaford, and was living at Eastgate House, Sleaford.

In 1959, as Robina Jeudwine a now single woman, she travelled on a Compañía Transatlántica Española ship to Las Palmas in the Canary Islands. She died in 1995 in Gloucestershire.
