= Lalla of Arneae =

Lalla of Arneae (fl. ca. 80 – 100 CE) was a Graeco-Roman civic benefactor.

Lalla was the daughter of Teimarchos of Arneae in Lycia, Asia Minor, and became the wife of a nobleman named Diotomos. She had a sister named Asë. She served as priestess to the Imperial cult, and was responsible for the construction of a public meeting house (parochion) and a gymnasium, and was known as a gymnasiarch. Some actions were done in tandem with her husband, such as setting up a statue of Trajan. For their public benefactions the couple were honoured with inscriptions put up by the city of Arneae and by the Lycian League, and Lalla was also honoured with inscriptions dedicated solely to her.
