= Lalla Rookh (disambiguation) =

Lalla Rookh is a poem written in 1817 by Irish poet Thomas Moore.

Lalla Rookh, Lala Rookh, Lalla Rooke, Lallah Rookh, Lala Rukh and other variant spellings may also refer to:

== Arts ==
- Lala Rookh, 1958 Bollywood film
- Lalla-Roukh, 1862 comic opera by Félicien David
- Lalla Roukh, character in the 1862 opera Feramors
- Lalla Rûkh, 1821 composition by Gaspare Spontini

== People ==
- Lala Rukh (activist) (1948–2017), Pakistani women's rights activist
- Truganini, the last Indigenous Tasmanian, nicknamed Lalla(h) Rookh

== Transport ==
- Lalla Rookh, a GWR 2900 Class locomotive, 1905–1946
- Lalla Rookh, a GWR Waverley Class locomotive, 1855–1872
- Lalla Rookh (ship), a number of ships

== Others ==
- Lallah Rookh, a circus elephant
- "Lalla Rookh", a 19th-century house in Muswell Hill, London
- "Lalla Rookh", a house in Kew, Victoria, occupied by painter George A. J. Webb
- Lalla Rookh Bank, a volcanic seamount near Vailuluʻu in the South Pacific
- Lalla Rookh, a thoroughbred racehorse, descendant of British horse Rockavon
- Lalla Rookh Museum, a museum about the Indo-Surinamese history and culture
- Lalla Rookh Station, an agricultural landholding in Western Australia

== See also ==
- Lallah Rookh White Rockwell (1876–1940), US educationalist
- Lallah Rookh Hart, actress in silent films such as A La Cabaret (1916) and Men, Women, and Money (1919)
