= Esmé Stuart, 2nd Duke of Lennox =

Esmé Stuart, 2nd Duke of Lennox was a Scottish nobleman. In 1588, it was suggested to James VI of Scotland that Lennox marry Lady Arbella Stuart, the King's cousin and a claimant to the thrones of England and Scotland.
