= Lala language =

Lala language may refer to:

- Lala language (South Africa)
- Lala-Bisa language (Zambia)
- Lala language (Papua New Guinea)
- Lala-Roba language (Nigeria)
- Laalaa language of Senegal
