= List of storms named Lala =

The name Lala has been used for two tropical cyclones in the Central Pacific Ocean:

- Tropical Storm Lala (1984) – tracked south of Hawaii and did not affect land.
- Hurricane Lala (2026) – a Category 4 hurricane that caused extensive flooding in Hawaii.

== See also ==
Storms with similar names

- Cyclone Laila (2010) – a North Indian Ocean severe cyclonic storm that affected India and Sri Lanka.
- Cyclone Mala (2006) – a North Indian Ocean extremely severe cyclone storm that made landfall in Myanmar.
