= Lali, Darchula =

Lali लाली
- Village development committee
- Location in Nepal
- Coordinates: 29.65°N 80.44°E
- Country: Nepal
- Zone: Mahakali Zone
- District: Darchula District

Population (1991)
  - Total: 3,005
- Time zone: UTC+5:45 (Nepal Time)

Lali is a village development committee in Darchula District in the Mahakali Zone of western Nepal. At the time of the 1991 Nepal census, it had a population of 3005 people living in 528 individual households.
