= Lalan-e Sofla =

Lalan-e Sofla لالان سفلي
- Village
- Location within Iran
- Coordinates: 39°06′26″N 47°05′32″E
- Country: Iran
- Province: East Azerbaijan
- County: Khoda Afarin
- Bakhsh: Central
- Rural District: Keyvan

Population (2006)
  - Total: 47
- Time zone: UTC+3:30 (IRST)
  - Summer (DST): UTC+4:30 (IRDT)

Lalan-e Sofla (Persian: لالان سفلي, also Romanized as Lālān-e Soflá; also known as Lālān-e Pā'īnī) is a village in Keyvan Rural District, in the Central District of Khoda Afarin County, East Azerbaijan Province, Iran. At the 2006 census, its population was 47, in 12 families. The village is populated by the Kurdish Mohammad Khanlu tribe.
