= Lala Fazal-ur-Rehman =

Pakistani politician

Lala Fazal-ur-Rehman (Urdu: لالا فضل الرحمان) was a former administrator of Karachi District, Sindh, Pakistan.

== See also ==
- Karachi
- Government of Karachi
