= Château de la Verrerie (Cher) =

Château in Centre-Val de Loire, France

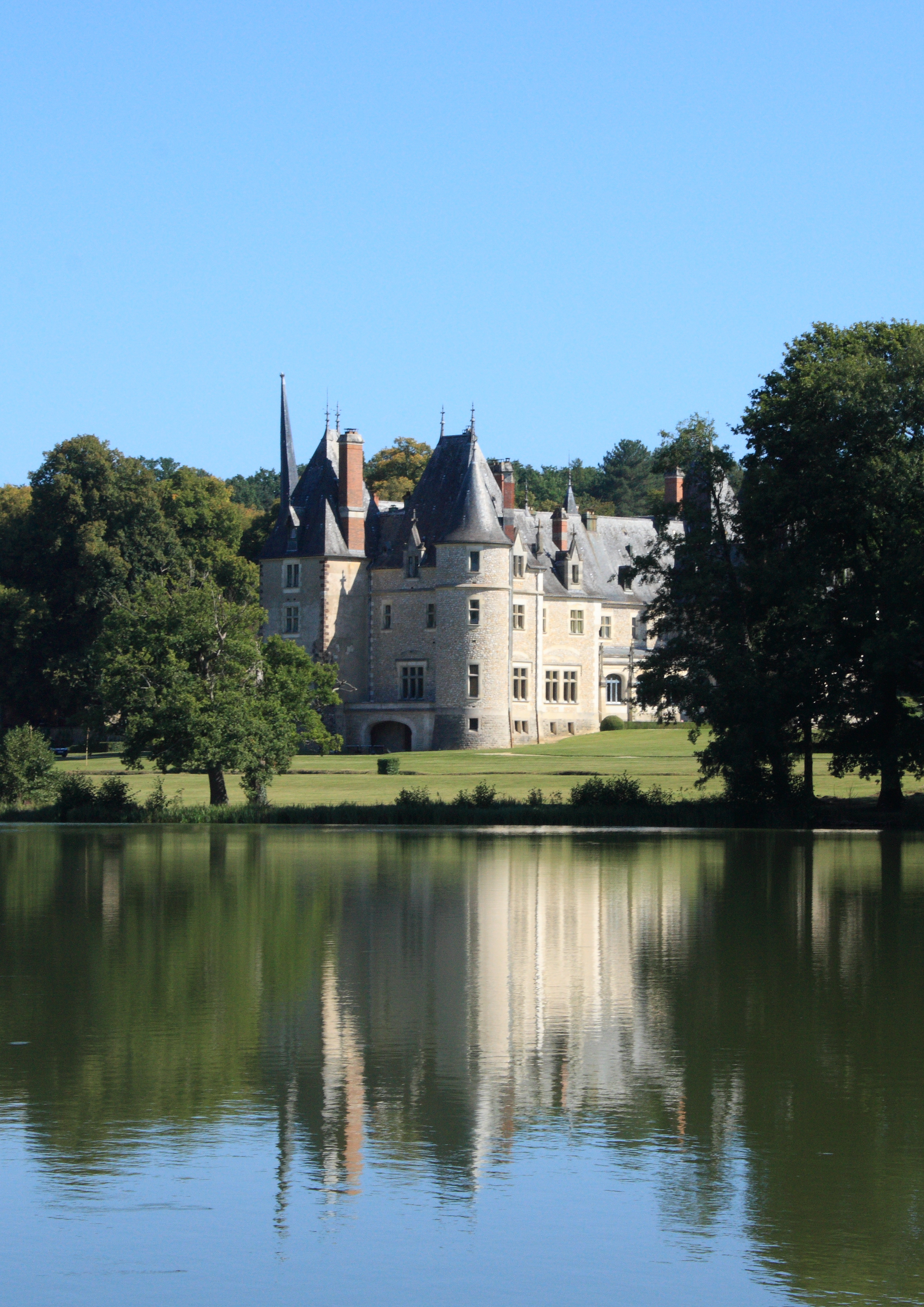
Château de la Verrerie

The Château de la Verrerie is a château in Oizon, in the ancient province of Berry (now Cher) in France. It is an historic ancestral seat of a junior branch of the Scottish House of Stewart, known by the territorial title Seigneur d'Aubigny. It is situated about 14 miles south-east of Aubigny-sur-Nère, and the Château d'Aubigny, the original seat of its owners.

== Descent ==
=== Stewart ===
Arms awarded in 1427 by King Charles VII of France to Sir John Stewart (c.1365-1429) of Darnley, Scotland, 1st Seigneur d'Aubigny, 1st Seigneur de Concressault and 1st Comte d'Évreux, Constable of the Scottish Army in France: Royal arms of France within a bordure gules charged with eight buckles or. To quarter Stewart of Darnley. The buckles in the bordure refer to the de Bonkyl family of Bonkyl Castle in Scotland, whose canting arms were three buckles. The last in the male line was Sir Alexander de Bonkyll, whose daughter and heiress Margaret de Bonkyl married Sir John Stewart of Bonkyll (d.1298), ancestor of the Stewarts of Darnley

The estate was a dependency of the Seigneurie d'Aubigny-sur-Nère, which was granted in 1423 by King Charles VII of France to Sir John Stewart of Darnley, 1st Comte d'Évreux, 1st Seigneur de Concressault, 1st Seigneur d'Aubigny (c. 1380 – 1429) a Scottish nobleman and famous military commander who served as Constable of the Scottish Army in France, supporting the French against the English during the Hundred Years War. He was a fourth cousin of King James I of Scotland (reigned 1406 to 1437), the third monarch of the House of Stewart. La Verrerie was a demeure d'agrément, or secondary residence used for leisure activities, of the Seigneurs d'Aubigny. The surviving structure, including the central corps de logis and chapel, was probably built between 1495-1500 by Bernard Stuart, 4th Seigneur d'Aubigny (d.1508) (Bérault, grandson of Sir John Stewart of Darnley), Captain of the Archers of the Scots Guards (an elite bodyguard of the French Kings) and Lieutenant-General of the Kingdom of Naples. The Gallery Wing with the two pavilions and the main entrance were added in about 1520-25 by his first-cousin once removed and son-in-law and successor Robert Stuart (d.1543), 4th Seigneur d'Aubigny, who married his daughter and heiress Anne Stewart.

In 1672, following the death of the last in the male line of the Stewarts of Aubigny, namely Charles Stewart, 3rd Duke of Richmond, 6th Duke of Lennox, 12th Seigneur d'Aubigny (1639-1672) (a fourth cousin of King Charles II), of Cobham Hall in Kent and of Richmond House in Whitehall, London, the estate escheated to the French crown, as ordained in the original deed of donation from King Charles VII.

=== Lennox ===
Arms granted to Louise de Kérouaille, as 1st Duchesse d'Aubigny: Gules, three buckles or, being the canting arms of de Bonkyll of Bonkyll Castle, common ancestor of both King Charles II and the Stewarts of Aubigny, the king's cousins and her predecessors at La Verrerie

In 1673, at the request of King Charles II of England, the Château de la Verrerie was granted by King Louis XIV to Louise de Kérouaille (1649-1734), the English king's last mistress. Also at Charles's request, in 1684 Louis XIV created her Duchesse d'Aubigny, a title in the Peerage of France. Although the English titles (Duchess of Portsmouth, Baroness Petersfield and Countess of Fareham) granted to Louise in 1673 by Charles were merely for her life, her French title was to be inherited by her male descendants sired by Charles, who were given the surname "Lennox". After Charles's death in 1685 Louise left England, with two shiploads of magnificent paintings and furniture from her apartment in the Palace of Whitehall given to her by the king, and lived the rest of her life at la Verrerie. On her death in 1734 her estate and French title were inherited by her grandson Charles Lennox, 2nd Duke of Richmond, 2nd Duke of Lennox, 2nd Duc d'Aubigny (1701-1750), of Goodwood House near Chichester in Sussex, the son and heir of Charles Lennox, 1st Duke of Richmond, 1st Duke of Lennox (1672-1723) (the youngest of the seven illegitimate sons of King Charles II), who had predeceased his mother. The French estate was retained by his descendants until 1842 when it was sold by Charles Gordon-Lennox, 5th Duke of Richmond, 5th Duke of Lennox, 5th Duc d'Aubigny (1791-1860). Much of the collection of paintings and furniture now at Goodwood House, seat of Charles Gordon-Lennox, 11th Duke of Richmond, 11th Duke of Lennox, 6th Duke of Gordon, 11th Duc d'Aubigny (born 1955), originated in the collection of his ancestress Louise de Kérouaille.

=== de Vogüé ===
It was purchased in 1842 from the 5th Duke of Richmond by the politician Léonce de Vogüé. In 1892 it was extended by his grandson Louis de Vogüé, to the designs of the architect Ernest Sanson.

== Architectural significance ==
It has been listed as an official historical monument by the French Ministry of Culture since 1987.
