= Hardiljeet Singh =

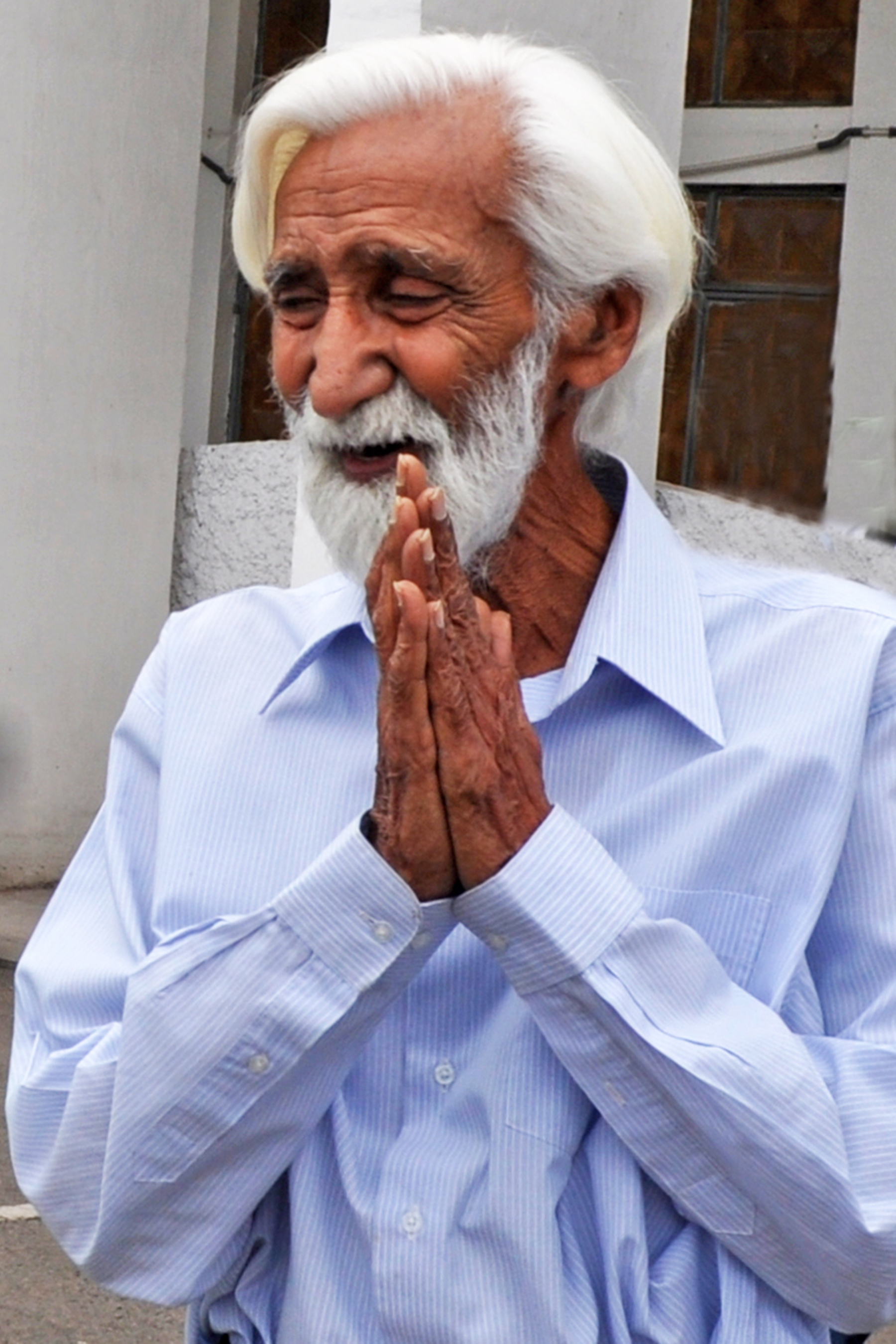
- He's in that pic
- Born: Hardiljeet Singh Sidhu; 14 September 1932
- Died: 28 December 2014 (aged 82)

Hardiljeet Singh Sidhu was an Indian writer.

== Biography ==
Lali was born in a landlord family belonging to village Fatehgarh near Lehragaga in Sangrur district in Punjab. He was married to Satwant Kaur in 1967 and had two sons and a daughter. Lali taught at Linguistics department in Punjabi University, Patiala before he retired. Though he never got published any book of his own, he was known to be a virtual treasure trove of world of art and literature. He carried on the oral tradition imparting a great deal of knowledge to those around him.

Noted Panjabi poet Navtej Bharati wrote a poetry book Lālī (ਲਾਲੀ) named after him and dedicated to him.

== Death ==
Lali died on 28 December 2014 at Patiala.
