= Gezim Ljalja =

Association football player

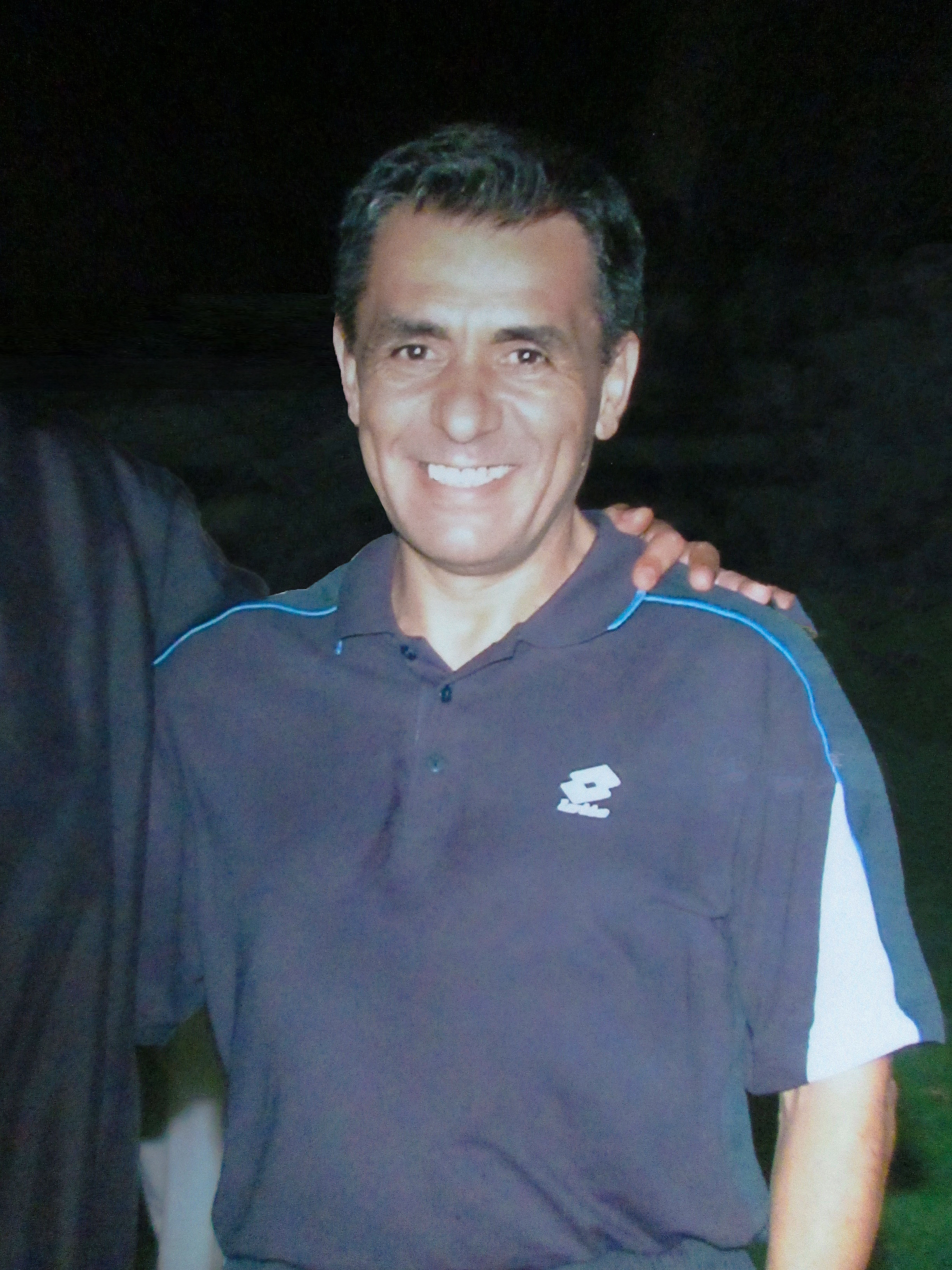
- Ljalja coaching FC Al-Suwaiq in Oman

Personal information
- Date of birth: 25 July 1956 (age 70)
- Place of birth: Đakovica, FPR Yugoslavia
- Position: Midfielder

Youth career
- 1968–1971: Vëllaznimi
- 1971–1973: Galenika Zemun

Senior career*
Years	Team	Apps	(Gls)
1973–1986	Galenika Zemun	+119	(+22)

Managerial career
- 1986–1992: Zemun (U16)
- 1992–1999: Zemun (assistant)
- 1999–2004: Zemun (managing director)
- 2004–2005: Al-Hilal Benghazi
- 2005–2006: Zemun (managing director)
- 2006: Zemun (caretaker)
- 2008–2009: Al Suwaiq
- 2011–2012: Deren (U16)
- 2012–2013: Kairat (U19 assistant)
- * Club domestic league appearances and goals

Gezim Ljalja (Serbian Cyrillic: Гезим Љаља, Albanian: Gëzim Lala; born 25 July 1956) is a former Yugoslav footballer who spent his entire career at FK Zemun and became one of the greatest and most notable players of the club. He has also served as a football coach at many clubs abroad.

== Career ==
Born in Gjakova, AR Kosovo and Metohija, back then an autonomous province of PR Serbia within Yugoslavia, Ljalja grew up in his hometown where he started playing football from a young age.

At the time of high-school he had three passions, painting, music and football, but he was most attracted by the last one, and joined local side KF Vëllaznimi. At the age of 12 he was selected to be part of the representative youth team of the province of SAP Kosovo. They finished in first place at the tournament of the Yugoslav republics and provinces held in Borovo and immediately after, Yugoslav youth national team managers, Stevan Vilotić and Ante Mladinić, called him to the Yugoslavia national team to the tournament in Monte Carlo. Immediately upon their return, Stjepan Bobek and Marko Valok, who were coaching at the time FK Galenika Zemun, brought Ljalja along with his Vëllaznimi teammate Đokica Stanojević, to the club.

Zemun is a suburb of capital Belgrade, and initially Ljalja had difficulties in adapting since he was coming from a rural area. After six months Ljalja was already feeling at home. The team was playing well with attractive football displayed by a number of great teammates, and all this was resulting in major enthusiasm and support from the fans. Around mid-1970s, as a player of FK Galenika Zemun, Ljalja was playing for Yugoslav youth national team at the Monte Carlo tournament in honour of Prince Charles. At that initial period he also played for the National amateur team of Yugoslavia and also the Yugoslav Olympic team.

At that time footballers were starting to become real media stars and Ljalja gradually rose to fame and was considered a local star, especially in Zemun. His great performances with FK Zemun in the Yugoslav First and Second Leagues made him grow in prominence significantly. At some point, after filming a movie "Trener" (translated "Coach") in which Ljalja was an actor, the president of Red Star Belgrade, Dragan Džajić along with his associates Branko Stanković and Stevan Ostojić, spoke with Ljalja about the possibility of him joining "the giants", Red Star. Unfortunately, the transfer was never realised. Then Vladica Kovačević arranged a move of Simo Nikolić and Ljalja to Olympique Lyonnais, however, Zemun management decided that only one could leave, and they chose Nikolić over Ljalja. During the long period Ljalja spent at Zemun, he was also at trials in New York to join New York Cosmos but president of the club, Georgije Bošković, was advised by the coach that Ljalja was crucial for the club and that they couldn't let him go, so his transfer to Cosmos did not materialise.

Ljalja was part of the generation that took Zemun to the semi-finals of the 1981–82 Yugoslav Cup in which they lost against Red Star, but previously eliminating Hajduk Split and also winning against Partizan, on their home court, by 2–0 with Ljalja scoring the first goal. All in all, Ljalja spent his entire senior career at FK Zemun becoming one of club's greatest legends, having played over 350 official matches. His speed, agility, explosiveness, dribbling and general creativity of playing on the field left his fans in awe and inspired many to play football afterwards. After retiring Ljalja led the youth department of FK Zemun which produced numerous notable players such as Nenad Džodić, Ilija Stolica, Nenad Đorđević, Mateja Kežman and many more.

He was declared an honorary citizen of Zemun by the Zemun Municipality.

== Personal life ==
With time, he has dedicated himself more to painting. He married at age 41 to his wife Kimet whom he met during holidays in Gjakova, and has two children, a son Eduard and a daughter Edita both born and living in Zemun.
