= Shanghai Lalas =

2012 book by Lucetta Kam Yip-lo

- First edition
- Author: Lucetta Kam Yip-lo
- Series: Queer Asia
- Release number: 1
- Genre: Non-fiction
- Publisher: Hong Kong University Press
- Publication date: 2012
- Publication place: China

Shanghai Lalas: Female Tongzhi Communities and Politics in Urban China is a 2012 book written by Lucetta Kam Yip-lo (Chinese: 金曄路; Jyutping: gam1 jip6 lou6; pinyin: Jīn Yèlù) and published by the Hong Kong University Press. It is Volume 1 of the Queer Asia series.

The book discusses lalas (Chinese: 拉拉; pinyin: lālā), including female bisexuals, lesbians, and trans women, in Shanghai. From 2005 to 2011, as part of her research, Lucetta Kam interviewed 25 lalas. Most of the women were in their 20s and originated from urban areas.

Shanghai-born Lucetta Kam is an assistant professor at Hong Kong Baptist University (HKBU), and she is involved in LGBT organizations in Hong Kong, where she was raised. Lucetta Kam herself is a lesbian, and Joanna Chiu of the South China Morning Post wrote that Lucetta Kam "needed to work to maintain her distance from her subjects".

== Reception ==
Joanna Chiu wrote that the book was "a balanced, richly insightful and succinctly argued study" that "reveals as many truths about the lives of urban lalas as about the shifting forms of social control - and strategies of social transformation - in Chinese society today."

== See also ==
- LGBT culture in Shanghai
