= Emerald B. Wilson =

American football coach

Biographical details
- Born: December 10, 1896; Cardington, Ohio, U.S.
- Died: April 3, 1975 (aged 78); Pompano Beach, Florida, U.S.

Coaching career (HC unless noted)

Football
- 1927–1930: Defiance
- 1934–1942: Hobart

Basketball
- 1927–1931: Defiance

Head coaching record
- Overall: 44–41–9 (football); 43–30 (basketball)

Emerald Beers Wilson (September 10, 1896 – April 3, 1975) was an American football and basketball coach. He served as the head football coach at Defiance College in Defiance, Ohio from 1927 to 1930 and at Hobart and William Smith Colleges in Geneva, New York from 1934 to 1942, compiling a career college football coaching record of 44–41–9. Wilson was also the head basketball coach at Defiance from 1927 to 1931, tallying a mark of 43–30.
