= Zümra =

Zümra is a Turkish language feminine given name meaning emerald. It was among the ten most popular names for newborn girls in Turkey in 2021.
