= Lalan-e Olya =

Lalan-e Olya لالان عليا
- Village
- Location within Iran
- Coordinates: 39°06′04″N 47°03′17″E
- Country: Iran
- Province: East Azerbaijan
- County: Khoda Afarin
- Bakhsh: Central
- Rural District: Keyvan

Population (2006)
  - Total: 35
- Time zone: UTC+3:30 (IRST)
  - Summer (DST): UTC+4:30 (IRDT)

Lalan-e Olya (Persian: لالان عليا, also Romanized as Lālān-e ‘Olyā; also known as Lān Lān-e Bālā) is a village in Keyvan Rural District, in the Central District of Khoda Afarin County, East Azerbaijan Province, Iran. At the 2006 census, its population was 35, in 8 families. The village is populated by the Kurdish Mohammad Khanlu tribe.
