= Leonardo Lala =

Albanian writer and activist (1906 – 2000)

- Born: 1906; Contessa Entellina, Sicily
- Died: March 4, 2000 (aged 94); Contessa Entellina, Sicily

Leonardo Lala (1906 – March 4, 2000) was a writer of Arbëreshë/Albanian origin from Contessa Entellina in Italy and an expert on Arbëresh language, and Arbëreshë history and folk traditions. In 1910 he immigrated to the U.S. (New Orleans), where he remained for about three years. Upon his return in 1913 Lala attended elementary school and finished fourth grade and then began to devote himself to farm work, as did most people in Contessa Entellina.

While Lala's education was limited to only elementary school, he remained deeply interested in Arbëresh and Albanian culture. He was a committed researcher who taught himself as much as possible about the language, history and traditions, and wrote several pieces in Italian and Albanian based on his researches, both in prose and verse. Some are reported to have been regularly used in cultural and current affairs of the Italian-Albanian communities. Lala oversaw the writing of a glossary of about 4,000 Arbëreshë words used in Contessa Entellina.

Lala retired from farming at the age of 80, and focused on his researches into Arbëreshe culture. He died, aged 94, in Contessa Entellina on March 4, 2000.
