= Château d'Aubigny =

Coordinates: 47°29′20″N 2°26′27″E

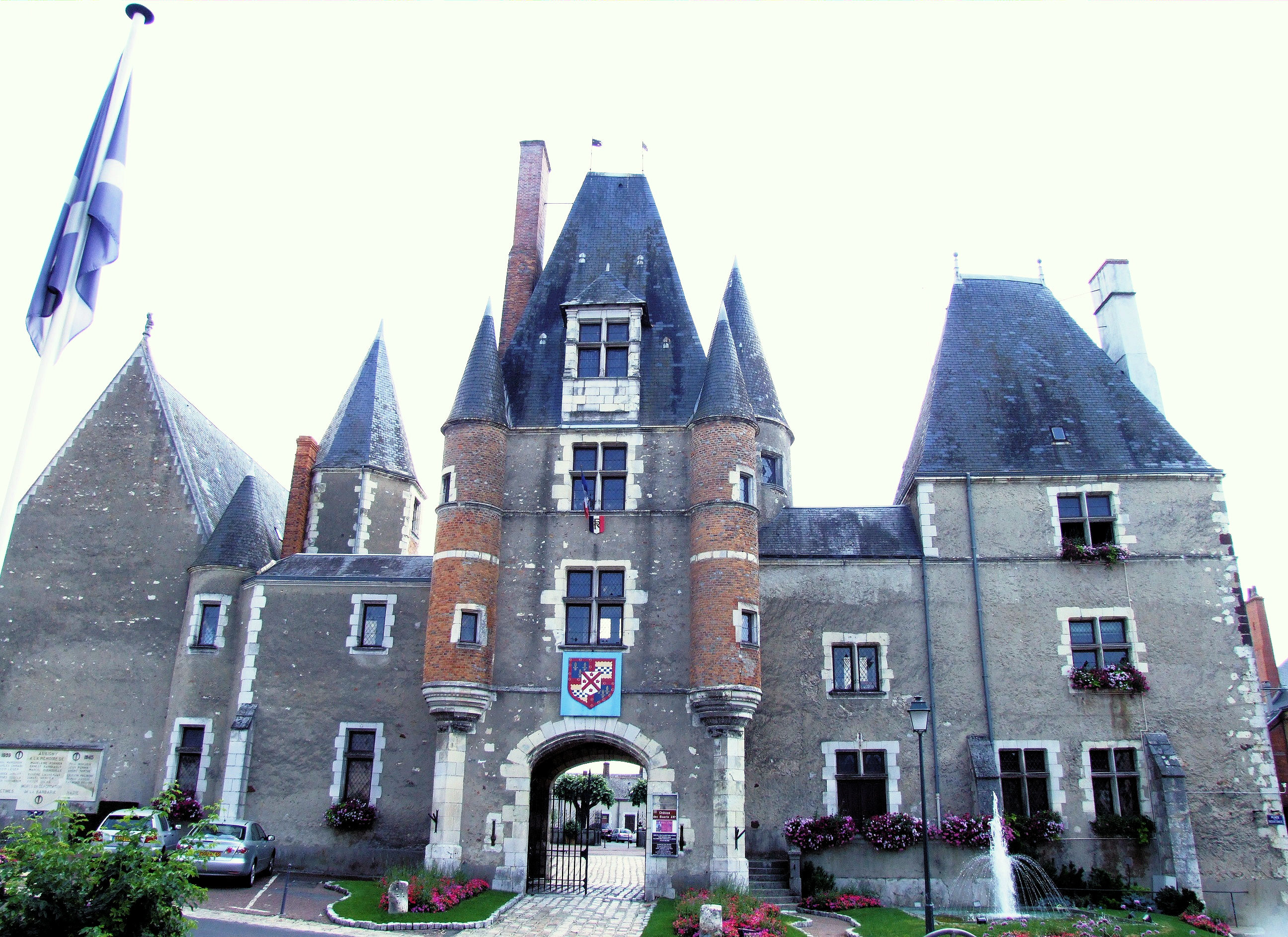
The Château d'Aubigny

The Château d'Aubigny, in the parish and manor of Aubigny-sur-Nère in the ancient province of Berry in France, is an historic ancestral seat of a junior branch of the Scottish House of Stewart, known by the territorial title Seigneur d'Aubigny. It is known to the French as the Château des Stuarts.

== History ==
The estate was first acquired by Sir John Stewart of Darnley, 1st Comte d'Évreux, 1st Seigneur de Concressault, 1st Seigneur d'Aubigny (c. 1380 – 1429), a Scottish nobleman and famous military commander who served as Constable of the Scottish Army in France, supporting the French against the English during the Hundred Years War. He was a fourth cousin of King James I of Scotland (reigned 1406 to 1437), the third monarch of the House of Stewart.

== See also ==
- Château de la Verrerie (Cher), another Stewart seat at Oizon, 14 miles south-east of Aubigny.
- Stewart of Darnley
