= Edmé =

- Pronunciation: /ˈɛdmeɪ/ /ˈɛdmiː/
- Gender: Masculine

Origin
- Origin: French short form of Edmund
- Meaning: "rich protector"

Other names
- Related names: Edmée (feminine form), Edmund, Edmond, Esmé

The name Edmé may refer to:

- Edmé Bouchardon (1698–1762), French sculptor
- Edmé Boursault (1638–1701), French writer and dramatist
- Edme Castaing (1796–1823), French physician
- Edmé-Louis Daubenton (1732–1786), French naturalist
- Gaston Audiffret-Pasquier (1823–1905), born Edme-Armand-Gaston d'Audiffret-Pasquier, French politician
- Edme Étienne Borne Desfourneaux (1767–1849), French general
- Edme Gaulle (1762–1841), French sculptor
- Edme Henry (1760–1841), Canadian politician
- Edme François Jomard (1777–1862), French engineer and cartographer
- Edme-Jean Leclaire (1801–1872), French economist
- Edme Mariotte (1620–1684), French physicist
- Edme Mongin (1668–1746), French bishop and orator
- Edmé Samson (1810–1891), French ceramist
- Edmé-Martin Vandermaesen (1767–1813), French general in the Napoleonic Wars
- Edmé Félix Alfred Vulpian (1826–1887), French physician

== People named Edmée ==
- Édmée Chandon (1885–1944), first professional female astronomer in France
- Edmée Daenen (born 1985), Belgian singer
- Edmée Hatinguais (1896 -1972), French teacher, educationalist and inspectrice générale de l'Instruction publique
- Edmee Janss (born 1965), Dutch cricketer
- Edmée Pardo (born 1965), Mexican writer
