= S. A. Lalli =

Indian economist

S.A. Lalli (full name Saleem Ahmed Lalli or Salim Ahmed Lalli) is the Professor of Economics at Shaheed Bhagat Singh College, University of Delhi and the Economics Author. A native of Nuh district of North Indian state Haryana, he received his B.A. in Economics from Jamia Millia Islamia University, his M.A. and MPhil from Jawaharlal Nehru University, Delhi. He is currently the academic of Economics Department, Shaheed Bhagat Singh College, University of Delhi.

== Works ==
Books by S.A Lalli include:

- Mewat Social and Economic Development. In this book, the author focused on the status of socio-economic backwardness in Mewat region. This work also suggests steps to energize socio-economic development so that Mewat region is brought into mainstream development process of the nation.
- Principles of Microeconomics.
- Infrastructure And Agricultural Development in Policy Implications. This work expounds on the importance of infrastructure in agricultural development in Haryana, the spatial dimensions in its distribution over time and study interlinkages in agricultural infrastructural facilities available in the state.
- Underdeveloped Mewat-who is Responsible?

== See also ==
- Mewat
- Shaheed Bhagat Singh College
- List of economists
