= Aubigny-sur-Nère =

- Commune
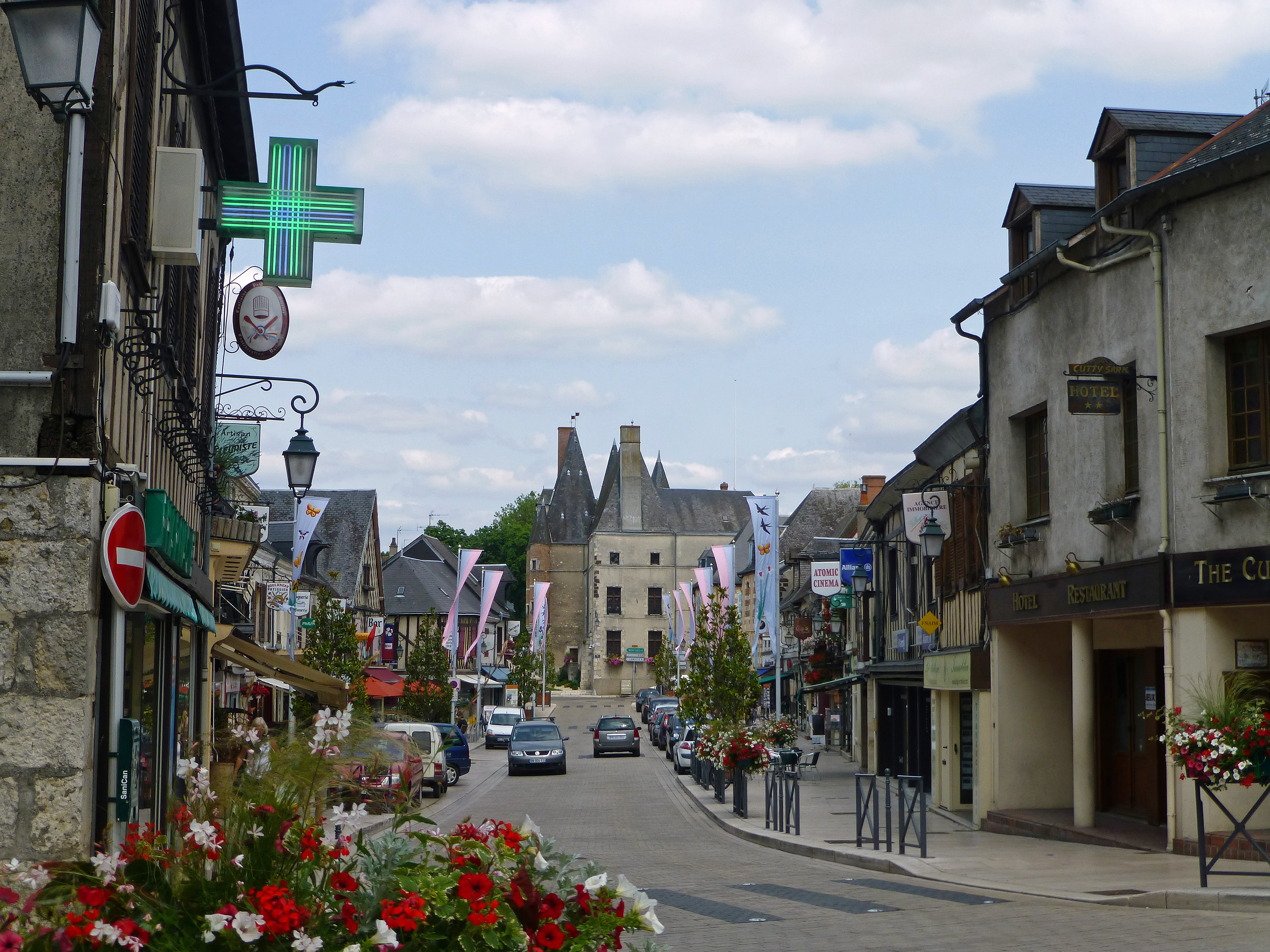
- Shops in Aubigny-sur-Nère

- Coat of arms
- Location of Aubigny-sur-Nère
- Location within France Location within Centre-Val de Loire
- Coordinates: 47°29′22″N 2°26′24″E
- Country: France
- Region: Centre-Val de Loire
- Department: Cher
- Arrondissement: Vierzon
- Canton: Aubigny-sur-Nère
- Intercommunality: CC Sauldre Sologne

Government
  - Mayor (2020–2026): Laurence Renier
- Area^{1}: 61.5 km^{2} (23.7 sq mi)
- Highest elevation: 233 m (764 ft)
- Lowest elevation: 161 m (528 ft)
- Population (2023): 5,451
  - Density: 88.6/km^{2} (230/sq mi)
- Time zone: UTC+01:00 (CET)
  - Summer (DST): UTC+02:00 (CEST)
- INSEE/Postal code: 18015 /18700
- Website: www.aubigny-sur-nere.fr
- ^{1} French Land Register data, which excludes lakes, ponds, glaciers > 1 km^{2} (0.386 sq mi or 247 acres) and river estuaries.

Aubigny-sur-Nère (French: [obiɲi syʁ nɛʁ]) is a town and commune in the Cher department in the administrative region of Centre-Val de Loire, France.

== Geography ==
An area of forestry and farming surrounding a small light industrial town, situated in the valley of the river Nère some 30 miles (48 km) north of Bourges at the junction of the D940, D924, D30 and the D923 roads.

== History ==
First known as Albinacum in Roman times, the commune was established as a royal town in 1189 by Philip II.
This is the location by which the Duke of Richmond and Gordon gets his honorific title, as the Duke of Aubigny. In 1419, John Stewart of Darnley, a junior member of the House of Stuart, arrived in France with a large contingent of Scottish soldiers, to fight for Charles VII. He was awarded many titles, among them the Lordship of Aubigny. The family stayed here for 400 years.

=== Links with Scotland ===
Aubigny is a common tourist destination for Scots and others from the United Kingdom. The commune is very attached to the Auld Alliance, due to its 400 years of French-Scottish history and is the only place in France that still celebrates this long association each year, on Bastille Day. It is twinned with the Scottish town of Haddington, East Lothian.

== Population ==
Historical population
Year	Pop.	±% p.a.
1968	5,242	—
1975	5,468	+0.60%
1982	5,600	+0.34%
1990	5,803	+0.45%
1999	5,907	+0.20%
2007	5,751	−0.33%
2012	5,590	−0.57%
2017	5,488	−0.37%
2023	5,451	−0.11%
Source: INSEE

== Places of interest ==
- The church of St.Martin, dating from the thirteenth century.
- The fifteenth-century Château d'Aubigny.
- The sixteenth-century Chateau de la Verrerie.
- Several sixteenth-century houses.
- A tower, one of few remains of the original town fortifications.
- A museum dedicated to Marguerite Audoux, (1863–1937), a writer who lived nearby.

== Personalities ==
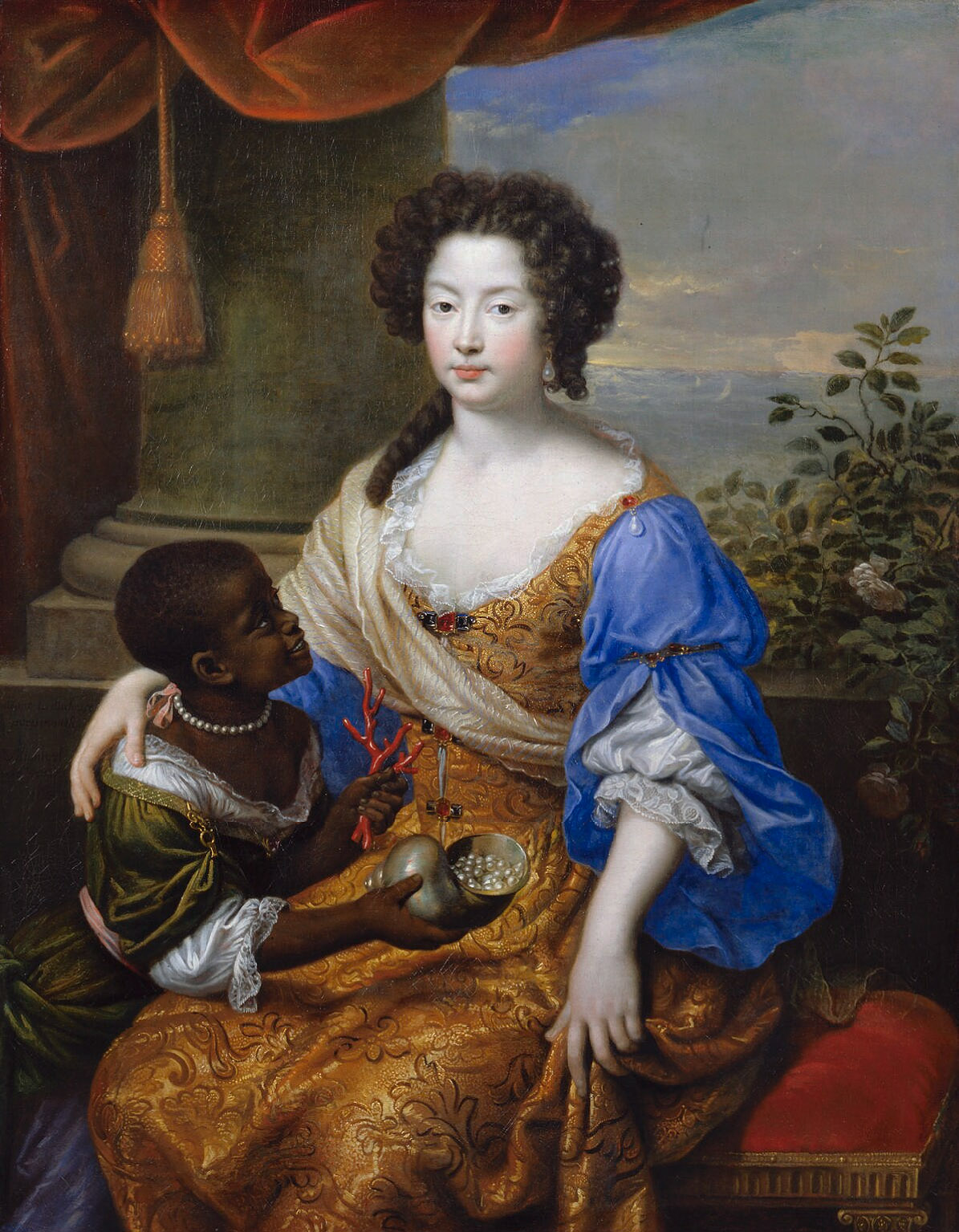
Louise de Kérouaille

- John Stewart, Earl of Buchan (1381–1424)
- Bernard Stewart, Lord of Aubigny (1452–1508)
- Robert Stewart, Lord of Aubigny (1470–1544)
- Louise de Kérouaille, Duchess of Portsmouth and Aubigny (1649–1734)
- Théophile Moreux, astronomer, is buried here.

== Twin towns ==
- Haddington, East Lothian, Scotland
- Plopana, Romania
- Oxford, Mississippi, United States
- Vlotho, Germany

== See also ==
- Sologne
- Communes of the Cher department
