= Lala (Chinese slang) =

Slang term for "lesbian"

Lala (Chinese: 拉拉; pinyin: lālā) is a non-derogatory Chinese slang term for lesbian, or a same-sex desiring woman. It is used primarily by the LGBT+ community in mainland China. Beginning in the late twentieth and early twenty-first centuries, lala communities started to form in urban areas of China, such as Beijing and Shanghai, using bars and online chatrooms to connect.

In 2005, a group of young self-identifying lalas in Beijing founded les+ Magazine, China's first and only queer women's magazine. Despite legal restrictions in China over LGBT issues, les+ has found subscribers in all 23 Provinces of China as well as several countries abroad. The slogan printed on the magazine's first issue read: "After the darkness fades away, I’ll be holding your hand, walking under the sunlight with pride, boldly and happily living our lives!"

In 2012, Lucetta Kam Yip-lo, an assistant professor at Hong Kong Baptist University (HKBU), published the book Shanghai Lalas: Female Tongzhi Communities and Politics in Urban China. Kam's monograph features interviews with 25 Chinese lalas, female bisexuals, and trans women living in Shanghai, most of whom were women in their twenties from urban areas.

== Origins ==
The term lazi first entered the mainland Chinese lexicon through Taiwanese writer Qiu Miaojin's novel Notes of a Crocodile (1994), which features a central character named Lazi. Chinese individuals identifying as lesbian have since favoured the term lala to describe their sexual orientation.
