= Amélie Claire Leroy =

French writer (1851–1934)

Amélie Claire Leroy (1851 – 12 March 1934) was a French writer, who wrote more than 60 works in English often using the pseudonym Esmé Stuart.

== Biography ==
Leroy was born in Paris. She lived for a while in Winchester with the novelist Anna Rachel Bramston (Witham 1848/9–1931) and they adopted a daughter called Juliette Charlotte Leroy, identified as Leroy's niece. Bramston, the daughter of John Bramston, founded Winchester High School, a boarding school for girls, in 1884; the school is now called St Swithun's School.

In 1903, Leroy wrote a letter to the Secretary of The Rhodes Trust asking to admit women to the Rhodes Scholarship. Her request was refused.

== Literature ==
Leroy wrote seven dozen novels, many of them aimed at young women, in the late Victorian and Edwardian eras. One of her best known series, the Harum Scarum novels, features the wild Australian schoolgirl Antonia "Toney" Whitburn, forced to live with her aristocratic aunt and uncle in England.

== Bibliography ==
- The Good Old Days, or, Christmas under Queen Elizabeth. With illustrations by H. S. Marks. (1876)
- The Little Brown Girl. (1877)
- Master Trim's Charge. (1879)
- Mimi: a story of Peasant Life in Normandy. (1879)
- The Belfry of St. Jude. (1880)
- How They Were Caught in a Trap. A Tale of France in 1802. (1880)
- Overtaken by the Tide; or, holidays at Old Port. (1881)
- Vanda. A story. (1881)
- The White Chapel. (1881)
- Adé, a story of German life. (1882)
- Isabeau's Hero. A story of the Revolt of the Cevennes. (1882)
- Lia A Tale of Nuremberg. (1883)
- The Fate of Castle Löwengard: a story of the days of Luther (1884)
- An Out-of-the-way-Place. (1884)
- The Prisoner's Daughter. A story of 1758. (1884)
- A faire damzell. (1885)
- Jesse Dearlove (1885)
- The Last Hope. (1885)
- A Little Place. (1885)
- Miss Fenwick's Failures; or, 'Peggy Pepper-Pot,' etc. (1885)
- The Unwelcome Guest. Illustrated by M. E. Butler. (1886)
- Ursula's Fortune. (1886)
- For Half a Crown. (1887)
- The Goldmakers. [A tale.] (1887)
- In his Grasp. [A tale.] (1887)
- Muriel's Marriage. (1887)
- Carried Off. A Story of Pirate Times (1888)
- Daisy's King. (How Mick Keverne won the race.) (1888)
- An Idle Farthing. (1888)
- Joan Vellacot. (1888)
- Edgar's Wife. (1889)
- One for the Other: stories of French life. (1889)
- Out of Reach. A Story for Girls (1890)
- Cast Ashore. (1890)
- The Vicar's Trio. (1890)
- Kestell of Greystone. (1891)
- The Silver Mine. An underground story. (1891)
- A Brave Fight, and other stories. (1892)
- A Nest of Royalists. (1892)
- A Small Legacy. (1892)
- Virginie's Husband. (1892)
- By Right of Succession (1893)
- Claudea's Island. (1893)
- A Woman of Forty. (1893)
- Inscrutable. (1894)
- The Power of the Past. (1894)
- Harum Scarum: The Story of a Wild Girl (1895)
- Married to order; a romance of modern days. (1895)
- Arrested. (1896)
- The Footsteps of Fortune. (1896)
- Harum Scarum. A poor relation. (1896)
- A Mine of Wealth. (1896)
- Tangled Threads. (1897)
- By Reeds and Rushes. (1898)
- The Knights of Rosemullion. (1898)
- The Strength of Two. (1998)
- Sent to Coventry. (1898)
- In the dark (1899)
- Christalla. An unknown quantity. (1900)
- The Strength of Straw. (1900)
- For Love and Ransom. (1905)
- Mona: a Manx idyll. (1905)
- Harum Scarum ... Sixteenth thousand. (1905)
- A Charming Girl (1907)
- Two Troubadours. With illustrations by W. Herbert Holloway. (1912)
- Harum Scarum's Fortune (1915)
- Harum Scarum Married. (Originally published under the title of Two Troubadours.). (1918)
- The Culture of Chris. (1919)
- The Taming of Tamzin. (1920)

Works with other authors:

- Astray: a tale of a country town. By C. M. Yonge, M. Bramston, C. Coleridge, E. Stuart. (1886)
