= Eduardo Trejos Lalli =

Costa Rican internationalist and politician (born 1972)

Permanent Representative to the Central American Bank for Economic Integration
- In office 21 August 2021 – 8 May 2022
- President: Carlos Alvarado Quesada
- Preceded by: Ottón Solís Fallas
- Succeeded by: Luis Francisco Corrales (acting)

Director of Intelligence and National Security
- In office 8 May 2018 – 21 August 2021
- President: Carlos Alvarado Quesada
- Preceded by: Mariano Figueres Olsen
- Succeeded by: Jorge Torres Carrillo

Ambassador of Costa Rica to Nicaragua
- In office 16 August 2016 – 8 May 2018
- President: Luis Guillermo Solís
- Preceded by: Javier Sancho Bonilla
- Succeeded by: Óscar Solís Rangel (chargé d'affaires)

Vice Minister of Foreign Affairs
- In office 8 May 2014 – 16 August 2016
- President: Luis Guillermo Solís
- Preceded by: Luis Fernando Salazar Alvarado
- Succeeded by: Alexander Montero Campos

Personal details
- Born: Eduardo Octavio Trejos Lalli; 15 December 1972 (age 53) San José, Costa Rica
- Party: PAC
- Education: Latin University of Costa Rica (BA)

Eduardo Octavio Trejos Lalli (born 15 December 1972) is a Costa Rican internationalist, private consultant and politician who served as Permanent Representative to the Central American Bank for Economic Integration from 2021 to 2022. Trejos was also Director of National Intelligence and Security and has held the position of Deputy Foreign Minister, interim Foreign Minister and Ambassador of Costa Rica to Nicaragua.

== Life and career ==
Trejos is the son of Alfonso Trejos Willis (Costa Rican) and Susana Lalli Giménez (Argentine), Trejos was born in San José, Costa Rica. Trejos studied International Relations with specialization in foreign trade.

Trejos served as an independent consultant and parliamentary adviser. He joined the Foreign Ministry as an advisor to the Vice Minister in the 1998–2000 period, where he served as Foreign Policy Director, where he also served as liaison with the Legislative Assembly of Costa Rica and in the trade talks with the European Union. Between 2000 and 2002, he moved to the Ministry of Tourism, where he was chief of staff at the minister's office.

In 2003 he was in charge of negotiation between Costa Rica and Nicaragua for the Procuenca del Río San Juan Project and as a researcher of the Program of High Public Management of INCAE in 2004. He joined the Citizens' Action Party in 2005 and served as an advisor in Deputy Ruth Montoya Rojas' office. Later, he was Director of Advisors for the Citizen Action Party's bench and a principal advisor to the group's spokesperson. Between 2010 and 2014, he was an independent consultant for the Information and Knowledge Society Program (PROSIC) of the Universidad de Costa Rica, the Inter-American Development Bank and the Institute of Development Studies.

Trejos was appointed administrative Vice Minister in the Ministry of Foreign Affairs since May 8, 2014 during the Solís Rivera administration. During his tenure as interim chancellor, he was responsible for leading the III Summit of CELAC hosted by Costa Rica.

He assumes the position of Costa Rican ambassador in Managua, Nicaragua, as of June 8, 2016 after the previous holder, Javier Sancho Bonilla, retired. In addition to streamlining visa delivery processes at the Nicaraguan consulate, through the implementation of a prior appointment process, Trejos promoted trade and tourism exchange among the two nations. Trejos was appointed Director of the Intelligence and Security Directorate in the administration of Carlos Alvarado Quesada, the intelligence agency of Costa Rica.

Trejos has also served as professor of theory of the state and international affairs at the Latin University of Costa Rica.

Political offices
Preceded by Mariano Figueres Olsen	Director of Intelligence and Security of Costa Rica; 2018–present	Succeeded by Incumbent
