= Lála =

Lála is a surname. Notable people with the surname include:

- Jan Lála (1938–2025), Czech football player
- Jiří Lála (born 1959), Czech ice hockey player

== See also ==
- 26973 Lála, a main-belt asteroid
