= Plasma Economy =

Campaign incentivizing plasma donation in Henan

Plasma Economy (Chinese: 血浆经济) was a 1991–1995 plasmapheresis campaign by the Henan provincial government in China, in which blood plasma was extracted in exchange for money. The campaign attracted 3 million donors, most of whom lived in rural China, and it is estimated at least 40% of the blood donors subsequently contracted HIV.

The Plasma Economy campaign boomed due to demand by biotech companies, and became a lucrative source of income for middlemen. The campaign had low health and safety standards, and lacked proper sterilization procedures; needles, blood bags, and other equipment in contact with blood were often recycled and reused. It is estimated that by 2003, over 1.2 million people had contracted AIDS in Henan Province alone.

== Background ==
In the late 1980s, the Chinese Central government introduced a "blood donation planning" policy due to the demand for blood in urban areas. Local governments and "bloodheads" (simplified Chinese: 血头; traditional Chinese: 血頭, xuètóu, colloquially xiětóu) started encouraging blood donations. By 1990, thousands of public and commercial blood and blood plasma collection centers had been established across China, attracting donors with payments that could equal over a month's worth of income for some farmers.

== History ==
China's blood donation system is largely monetarily driven, and while attempts had been made in the 1980s to move to a voluntary system, they were mostly unsuccessful. In the early 1990s, China restricted the import of blood products, while calling for local investment by foreign pharmaceutical companies, especially to the province of Henan, where numerous plasmapheresis stations were built. The selling of blood plasma were seen by locals as a method to reduce poverty. They turned to their own blood as a ready source of cash income that would allow them to participate in China’s newly liberalized market economy.

In plasmapheresis, blood plasma is taken from donors, while the remaining blood constituents such as red blood cells are returned to the donor. The blood plasma is then sold to pharmaceutical companies to produce blood-based products. As a cost-cutting measure, some stations mixed several bloods in the same centrifuge, resulting in large-scale blood contamination. As a result, by 1995, such stations were shut down in Henan province, while blood collection was restricted by area, although demand for blood plasma still remained strong.

The impact of the Plasma Economy campaign had a long-lasting effect. It is estimated that by 1999, 43% of its blood donors in Caixian County in Henan were infected with AIDS, in the village of Wenlou, over 65% of residents tested had contracted HIV.

In 2004, China admitted that the commercial collection of plasma accounted for a quarter of all cases of HIV infection in China and that the epidemic had reached far beyond Henan Province.

HIV/AIDS activist Yan Lianke's 2005 book Dream of Ding Village is based on the incident.

A full-length play The King of Hell's Palace premiered at London's Hampstead Theatre on 5 September 2019, and gave a dramatisation of the events of the plasma economy scandal in Henan Province in the 1990s. It was written by Frances Ya-Cha Cowig, and directed by Michael Boyd.

== See also ==
- HIV/AIDS in China
- HIV/AIDS in Yunnan
- Hu Jia (activist)
- Gao Yaojie
- Love for Life
- Shuping Wang
- Wan Yanhai
- Weiquan movement
- Zeng Jinyan
