= 3 Needles =

- Promotional film poster
- Directed by: Thom Fitzgerald
- Written by: Thom Fitzgerald
- Produced by: Thom Fitzgerald; Bryan Hofbauer
- Starring: Shawn Ashmore; Stockard Channing; Tanabadee Chokpikultong; Isabelle Cyr; Olympia Dukakis; Sook-Yin Lee; Lucy Liu; Sandra Oh; Ian Roberts; Chloë Sevigny; Anele Solwandle
- Cinematography: Thomas M. Harting
- Edited by: Susan Shanks
- Music by: Christophe Beck; Trevor Morris
- Production companies: Bigfoot Entertainment; Emotion Pictures
- Release date: September 9, 2005 (Toronto International Film Festival)
- Running time: 127 minutes
- Country: Canada
- Languages: Afrikaans; Mandarin; Xhosa; French; English
- Box office: $12,327

3 Needles is a 2005 Canadian drama film directed by Thom Fitzgerald. The title refers to the three main characters who make a deal with the Devil in order to survive a global epidemic. The plot deals with interwoven stories of persons around the world who are dealing with HIV and AIDS, and stars Shawn Ashmore, Olympia Dukakis, Lucy Liu, Stockard Channing, Chloë Sevigny, and Sandra Oh.

The film was screened at various film festivals, and was given a limited release in the United States on December 1, 2006.

== Plot ==
A group of young men in South Africa, undergo a rite of passage symbolizing their change from boyhood into manhood.

In rural China, a heavily pregnant Jin Ping is caught by Chinese military men with crates of black market blood in her van. The blood is destroyed and she is subsequently gang raped. Jin Ping is then shown visiting a village and convincing the inhabitants to give blood for $5 each. They all agree, except Tong Sam, a rice farmer, as he is unable to give blood as he is sick. However, as Jin Ping's equipment is not safe, most of the people in the village contract HIV and die of AIDS, including Tong Sam's family. The military men led by Xuan arrive in the village to help with the disease, and they help Tong Sam grow rice, which he then gives out to his remaining neighbors. Government officials arrive in the town to test people for AIDS, but the testing is $10 per person, which one neighbor thinks is a scam because it "cost $5 when she gave me the virus."

In Canada, porn star Denys thinks he may be HIV positive. He cheats his monthly blood tests by taking blood samples from his ailing father instead of providing his own blood. Eventually his father dies, and his mother Olive finds out her son's job, much to her dismay. Denys subsequently quits his job. Olive finds out that her son is HIV positive when she goes to meet him at a self-help group. She then decides to infect herself with the HIV virus by drinking Denys's blood, and then gets a substantial pay-off from her health insurance company. She uses the money to provide a better life for her and Denys. One night they go out for dinner, and they are waited on by Maria, a former colleague of Denys. She informs him that she, and several other porn actors, are now infected with HIV because of Denys. She says "you killed me for $800".

In South Africa, where three nuns Clara, Mary, and Hilde arrive at a plantation where they are to give aid. Clara who is very head-strong goes to great lengths to look after the family of a young rape victim, whose grandmother has died, and who is cared for by her older brother. She asks for help from the plantation owner Hallyday, who makes sexual advances on her. Eventually she gives in and allows Hallyday to have sex with her, if he agrees to help the family she looks after. She eventually discovers that the older brother in the family is re-using the plantation's needles, effectively spreading infections amongst the people who live and work there. Following this, three men break into the nuns' bedroom and rape them. The nuns leave the plantation soon after, but as the car pulls away, Clara gets out and walks back to the plantation, removing her habit as she goes.

The epilogue is narrated by Hilde, who is revealed to be a Saint and has heard the prayers of everyone from the three stories detailed above. She wonders why the human race will not unite in the face of their common enemy, AIDS, and decides that God, or at least the way people believe in him, is to blame for this failure.

== Cast ==
- Chloë Sevigny as Clara
- Lucy Liu as Jin Ping
- Shawn Ashmore as Denys
- Stockard Channing as Olive
- Chin Han as Xuan
- Tanabadee Chokpikultong as Tong Sam
- Mabel Adams as Namhnru
- Sook-Yin Lee as Xiu
- Sandra Oh as Mary
- Olympia Dukakis as Hilde
- Yoyo Chorkreaw as Qi
- Tyson Hall as Zulu
- Siv Mbelu as Bongile
- Aubert Pallascio as Herold
- Ian Roberts as Hallyday
- Thantokazi Guili as Klipikwela
- Alwyn van den Heever as Isaac
- Isabelle Cyr as Canadian Health Care Worker
- Anele Solwandle as Huku
- Steven Crowder as Depanneur Manager

== Release ==
3 Needles debuted at the Toronto International Film Festival, was also shown at festivals in London, Stockholm, Karlovy Vary, Seattle, and Pusan. It made its commercial release in the United States at the New York City Museum of Modern Art on December 1, 2006 (World AIDS Day). Leading up to its U.S. premier, it was heavily promoted by the United Nations Global Media AIDS Initiative.

== Critical reception ==
On the review aggregator website Rotten Tomatoes, 36% of 39 critics' reviews are positive. Metacritic, which uses a weighted average, assigned the film a score of 48 out of 100, based on 12 critics, indicating "mixed or average" reviews.

On Variety, Dennis Harvey wrote that "the U.S. release (...) is a new director's cut that arranges the narrative panels consecutively. Result is still flawed, but greatly improved in the coherency of individual parts and as an engrossing whole."

The film won prizes for cinematography and direction at the Atlantic Film Festival. Fitzgerald was nominated for a Canadian Director's Guild Award for Best Direction of a Feature Film.

== See also ==
- HIV in Yunnan
- HIV/AIDS in the People's Republic of China
- Gao Yaojie
