= Wangdu (activist) =

Tibetan HIV/AIDS activist and monk

Wangdu (Tib: དབང་སྐུད་, dbang sdud; Chinese: Wangdui) is a former Tibetan monk who became an HIV/AIDS activist at the age of 41. He was sentenced to life imprisonment in 2008 for "endangering state security", and in 2012 he was in hospital.

Wangdu was born in the Dagzê County about 25 kilometres east of Lhasa. He was a monk of the Jokhang monastery and who was fluent in Chinese and led tours of the monastery. He participated in the 1989 Tibetan unrest in Lhasa and was arrested on 8 March 1989, the day martial law took effect in Lhasa after three days of protest. He was sentenced to three years "reform through labour" but his sentence was extended to eight years' imprisonment after he and 10 other political prisoners signed a petition stating that the 1951 17-Point Agreement was forced on an independent Tibet. Thus he became a political prisoner, and he was released from prison in 1995. However, he was prohibited by Chinese law from re-entering his monastery because he had received a prison sentence.

Wangdu went on to work with a British NGO on social development issues, and he subsequently became a health worker in Lhasa, working on the HIV Prevention in Lhasa Project which commenced in 2001 with AusAID and Burnet Institute funding. The project provides HIV/AIDS education for vulnerable groups such as prostitutes working in bars and brothels, and also in schools. When the 2008 demonstrations in Lhasa broke out, Wangdu did not participate in them. However, it is believed that he sent messages to contacts outside Tibet about the protests and that this resulted in his arrest. He was arrested by officials of the Lhasa City Public Security Bureau at his home in Lhasa on 14 March, and was held incommunicado until his trial seven months later.

On 7 November 2008, he was sentenced by the Lhasa City Intermediate People's Court to life imprisonment and lifetime deprivation of political rights on a charge of "endangering state security". It was alleged that he had set up an underground intelligence network in Lhasa to provide national security information to the "Dalai clique" (a term used by the Chinese government to describe individuals and organisations sympathetic with the Dalai Lama's views). It was also alleged that the network had produced and distributed materials that aimed to split the country by inciting a "Tibetan people's uprising". Wangdu was one of a group of seven Tibetans who were convicted of espionage and of transferring information to foreign countries. He was subsequently transferred to Chushul prison near Lhasa. The only way that the Burnet Institute could only obtain information concerning him was via the press.

According to official Chinese reports, by 2011 Wangdu was incarcerated in Drapchi prison in Lhasa. The Tibetan Centre for Human Rights and Democracy claim that he was being kept in solitary confinement in hospital at the end of February 2012 guarded by three police officers. They reported that "one of his hands was apparently broken and he had one side of his head shaven" and suggested that his injuries may have resulted from beatings in prison.

== See also ==
- Tibetan independence movement
- Tibetan sovereignty debate
- List of Tibetan political prisoners
- Prostitution in Tibet
- HIV/AIDS in the People's Republic of China
- Wan Yanhai
- Hu Jia (activist)
