= Aizhixing Institute of Health Education =

Chinese HIV/AIDS organization

- Formation: 1994; 31 years ago
- Founder: Hu Jia; Wan Yanhai
- Headquarters: Beijing, China
- Website: http://www.aizhi.org

The Aizhixing Institute of Health Education is a non-profit organization based in Beijing, China, which focuses on education about and spreading awareness of HIV/AIDS, as well as HIV/AIDS research and programs serving HIV-positive individuals.

The organization was founded in March 1994 by Wan Yanhai, and was originally called the AIZHI Action Project. It adopted its current name in 2002.

== Services ==
At the time of its founding, AIZHI Action Project focused primarily on preventing the spread of HIV/AIDS, providing education on age and sex, fighting discrimination of HIV-positive individuals and advocating for the LGBT community in China.

By 2003, services had expanded to include financial assistance and legal aid, and education programs were targeted towards specific demographics, including drug users, the LGBT community, migrant workers, sex workers, and students.

== History ==
AIZHI Action Project was initially based at Beijing University, but was shut down after authorities pressured the university.

In 2000, the group published the work of Gao Yaojie, who was attempting to bring attention to the Bloodhead scandal in Henan.

The organization was officially banned by the government on 1 July 2002. Founder Wan Yanhai registered AIZHI with the State Administration for Industry and Commerce, allowing it to reopen as a business rather than a non-profit, for which registration was more difficult.

In September 2003, the non-profit released a report describing how "the Chinese government...actively hindered progress towards halting the [AIDS] epidemic, denied people access to treatment and care, prevented the exchange of information on HIV/AIDS, and promoted unlawfulness and corruption in many parts of the country".

In December 2004, Aizhixing and the Shanghai University School of Law co-organized a conference on AIDS, law and human rights, which was held in Shanghai.

After a 2005 law was passed that limited NGO activities, the group renamed itself the Beijing Aizhixing Information Consulting Center.

In 2006, Beijing Zhiaixing Information Counseling Center received combined grant of $179,113 from National Endowment for Democracy and US State Department for conducting programs within China.

In December 2010, authorities opened an investigation into the organization, stated to be over tax regulations.

On 11 March 2011, government authorities demanded the organization remove a letter from their website that implicated two government officials in "a blood transfusion scandal that led to an HIV/AIDS epidemic in Henan province in the 1990s". On 15 March, the organization's website was shut down by authorities.

In 2012, the Guangzhou branch of the organization closed after staff reported police threatened them.
