= Shuping Wang =

Medical researcher and public health whistleblower

- 王淑平
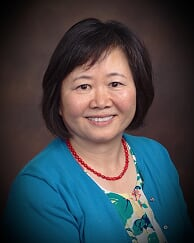
- Born: Zou Shuping (鄒淑平); 20 October 1959; Fugou County, Henan, China
- Died: 21 September 2019 (aged 59); Salt Lake City, Utah, U.S.
- Other names: Sunshine Christensen
- Citizenship: China and later United States
- Education: Henan Medical College
- Occupations: Physician, medical researcher
- Known for: Exposing the spread of HIV and hepatitis C among blood sellers in Henan in the 1990s
- Spouse(s): Geng Honghai, Gary Christensen
- Children: 3

Shuping Wang (Chinese: 王淑平, Wang Shuping, née Zou; 20 October 1959 – 21 September 2019) was a Chinese-American medical researcher and public health whistleblower. She exposed the poor practices that led to the spread of hepatitis C and HIV in central China in the 1990s, potentially saving tens of thousands of lives. In 2001, following harassment by Chinese officials, she moved to the United States, where she worked until her death.

== Early life ==
Wang was born Zou Shuping on 20 October 1959, in Fugou County, Henan. Her mother, Huang Yunling, worked as a village physician. Her father, Zou Bangyan, was a mathematics teacher who served as a soldier of the Kuomintang Army, which made her childhood difficult during the Cultural Revolution. She refused the Red Guards' command to denounce her parents and was expelled from school at the age of 8. When she was 13, she moved away from her village, was legally adopted by an uncle who was a member of the Communist Party, and adopted his surname, Wang. She was then allowed to continue her education.

== Career ==
Wang graduated from Henan Medical College in 1983, specializing in infectious diseases. From 1986 to 1991, she worked at Zhoukou Center for Disease Control and Prevention and conducted research in hepatitis. In 1991, she was assigned to work at a plasma collection center in Zhoukou, part of Henan's Plasma Economy project to pay donors for plasma donations. She found that several donors were infected with hepatitis C but were not turned away. At this point, plasma donations were not kept separate but mixed with all other donors', so that this infection spread to anyone that received the mixed sample. Further, to reduce costs, health workers would reuse tubing and other equipment that would be contaminated with a person's blood or plasma after donation. After confirming the presence of hepatitis C in several of the collections, she reported this to local health officials to change their practices, but they asserted it would cost too much to address the problem. She approached the national Ministry of Health with her findings, which led to a 1993 regulation to require all plasma donors to be screened for hepatitis C. She was removed from her position at the collection center, but took it upon herself to evaluate other facilities elsewhere, creating her own testing site and taking her own samples from the population, as well as evaluating collection centers and identifying further points of cross-contamination. She determined that the hepatitis C antibody was present in as high as 84.3% of the population in the region at the height of the epidemic.

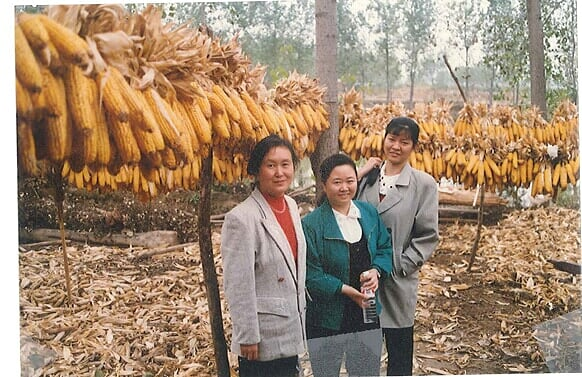
Shuping Wang (center), with public health colleagues visits rural AIDS village in Henan.

Around this time, AIDS became a major health concern across the world. China took to restricting blood samples from foreign countries for fear of bringing AIDS into the country, seeing it as a Western disease, and incentivised the people to donate blood and plasma as a precaution against AIDS. This was particularly popular for central China, mostly made up of farmers earning low wages, as they would be paid for their blood donations. Wang recognized the same concerns she had on discovering hepatitis, and began evaluating for the HIV virus that is a precursor to AIDS. After finding one patient with the virus in 1995, she found that HIV had a 13% infection rate in blood plasma collection centers in their area. Again, she attempted to alert local public health officials to screen for HIV, but they refused on the cost basis. Wang took her data to the Ministry of Health, and in 1996, a new regulation requiring HIV screening for donors was established, and ultimately leading China to take more precautionary measures to control the epidemic. She formed a campaign with Gao Yaojie, an obstetrician-gynecologist from Henan who would become a major AIDS activist in China; Wang evaluated the blood samples, while Yaojie was the spokesperson to report on these.

Wang was targeted for her whistleblowing by local health officials. One retired official smashed a sign at her testing site and then struck her with a baton. Some attempted to shut down her testing site, and eventually the local utilities were cut off, which destroyed the blood samples she had collected. She later moved to Beijing and found work there before moving to the United States in 2001. She became a naturalized US citizen and worked as medical researcher both in Milwaukee and at the University of Utah until her death.

According to David Cowhig, a U.S. Foreign Service officer at the Beijing embassy during the 1990s, Wang's research "was also the single most important source" that the United States had in understanding the AIDS epidemic in China, which was used in informing China–United States relations during the presidency of Bill Clinton. By 2001, the Chinese government affirmed that more than half a million citizens in central China may have been infected by HIV due to the poor collection practices that Wang had exposed. The BBC and The Guardian have credited Wang with potentially saving tens of thousands of lives.

== The King of Hell's Palace ==
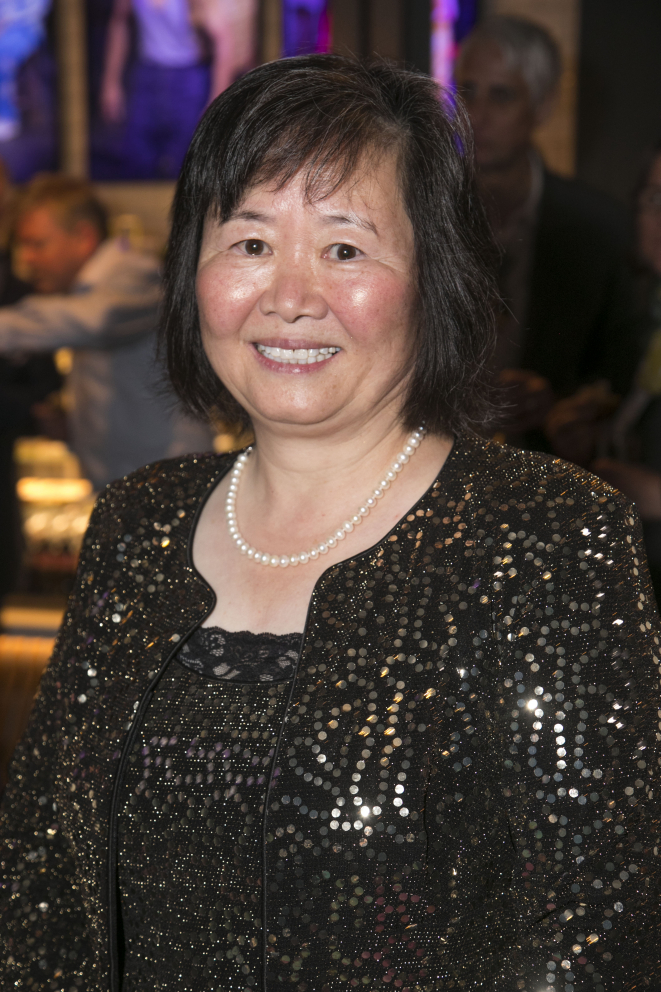
Wang at opening night of The King of Hell's Palace

In the month prior to her death, Wang was involved in the production of a play based on story of HIV epidemic in Zhoukou region and her whistleblowing, entitled The King of Hell's Palace, that was to open at the Hampstead Theatre in London. However, she reported that family and friends living in China had been intimidated to pressure her to drop the show. She said that this pressure was happening because Chinese officials were afraid of publicity, "but even after all this time, I will still not be silenced, even though I am deeply sad that this intimidation is happening yet again." She believed that the play would help expose corruption in Chinese health service, save people and help persecuted Chinese doctors and AID activists like Gao Yaojie and Wan Yanhai.

== Personal life ==
Wang's first husband was Geng Honghai, an employee of the Ministry of Health. They had a daughter, Samantha Geng, a clinical pharmacist. Wang's husband Geng was shunned by his colleagues during Wang's whistleblowing campaign, and their marriage ended in divorce. After moving to the United States in 2001, Wang took the English name Sunshine. Wang never felt safe enough to return to China. In 2005, she married Gary Christensen. They adopted her elder brother's two children, Julie Zou, an army nurse, and David Zou, an engineer.

Wang died from an apparent heart attack while she was hiking with Christensen in a canyon in Salt Lake City, Utah, on 21 September 2019.
