= YID =

YID may refer to:

- Yunnan Institute of Development
- Yid
