= Peony Garden incident =

2010 police operation in Beijing, China

The September 26, 2010 Peony Garden incident refers to the large-scale investigation of the Peony Garden, in Haidian, Beijing. On September 26, 2010 the Beijing police began rounding up gay men for questioning.

The garden is used as a gathering place for gay men in the area. Because many homosexuals in Beijing dare not expose their identity, crimes including robbery occur frequently here, and there are also gay prostitution activities here. On the evening of September 26, the police dispatched more than ten police cars to the Peony Garden for the purpose of "combating prostitution". Special police and armed police were guarding the perimeter. As many as 200 men were taken away for questioning, most of them on the next day. Afterwards, some people reported that they suffered a certain degree of psychological trauma. Those who were arrested were required to show their identity cards, take blood tests, give their fingerprints and photo taken.

Wan Yanhai was critical of the arrests and the Taipei Times believed that this incident reflected the fact that Chinese society did not yet have a tolerant attitude towards homosexuals, and that low-income homosexuals have nowhere to go.
