= Prostitution in Tibet =

Prostitution in Tibet is thought to have existed for centuries. Testimonies of its existence were provided by outside visitors in the first half of the twentieth century. According to the British writer Christopher Hale, due to the practice of polyandry in Tibet, many women were unable to find a husband and moved to villages and towns, where they fell into prostitution. Their clients came from the caravans crossing the Tibetan plateau, and also from the monasteries.

However, according to the Tibetan government in exile, prostitution as an industry was virtually non-existent before the Chinese occupation of Tibet. According to the Tibetan Women's Association: "In the past, in Tibet there were no brothels". Tibetan lawyer Lobsang Sangay recognizes the existence of prostitution before the arrival of the Chinese, but he says that the phenomenon was minimal compared to its current extent.

Since the 1980s, prostitution in the People's Republic of China, though officially illegal, has been growing. French poet Jean Dif, traveling in the Tibet Autonomous Region in September–October 2004, said of Lhasa, "There are said to be more than 4,000 prostitutes in the city, but I saw none". According to the French sociologist and religious historian Frédéric Lenoir writing in 2008, the traditional commercial quarter of Lhasa, capital of Tibet Autonomous Region, contained at that time karaoke bars, gambling houses and brothels. The number of brothels in Lhasa was estimated at more than 300. The establishments were located on the island of Jamalinka and in the Zhol Village near the Potala Palace.

== History ==
=== Before 1950 ===
In his book of interviews with the 14th Dalai Lama, the journalist Thomas Laird records that the 6th Dalai Lama, the young Tsangyang Gyatso (1683–1706), is said to have refused to take his vows and "spent his nights drinking in brothels", frequenting an inn in the village of Shöl (Zhol Village). The former village of Shöl, whose area stretched to the south of Potala, is said by the 2008 Lonely Planet Tibet guide book to have been Lhasa's red-light district.

According to writer and journalist Claude Arpi (director of the Tibetan building in Auroville), the Chinese warlord Zhao Erfeng who created the former province of Xikang that included the greater part of the Tibetan region of Kham, encouraged his Chinese soldiers to marry Tibetans by granting them money and land. These women, according to the historian Laurent Deshayes, "often ended up in soldiers' brothels" although "abandoning a Tibetan wife was severely punished by Zhao."

In its relation to 1938–39 German expedition to Tibet, the writer Christopher Hale, based on the diaries of Ernst Schäfer, reports of prostitution in Lhasa: "in the teeming streets women outnumber men and many of them are prostitutes. Due to the practice of polyandry, many women do not find husbands and come to the villages and towns where they fall into prostitution. Their customers are from the caravans that cross the Tibetan Plateau and also the monasteries". He adds that for most of the duration of their stay in Lhasa, the German residence Tredilingka was frequently besieged prostitutes seeking to seduce the occupants.

The Austrian mountaineer Heinrich Harrer, who lived in Lhasa from 1944 to 1950, reported in his memoirs that in Barkhor, "ladies of easy virtue practice their profession there".

In 1946, the 3rd Taktra Rinpoche who was regent of Tibet was slandered by saying that he "had an affair with a high-class prostitute called Nyi-a-sung".

According to the Tibetan Women's Association: "in the past, in Tibet, there were no brothels or drugs, and excessive alcohol use was low". For its part, the Tibetan government in exile says prostitution as an industry was virtually non-existent before the Chinese occupation of Tibet. Tibetan lawyer Lobsang Sangay points out that we can not say that prostitution did not exist at all before the arrival of the Chinese. Nevertheless, the phenomenon was minimal compared to its current extent.

=== After 1950 ===
In 1962, Choekyi Gyaltsen, 10th Panchen Lama claimed in his 70,000 Character Petition that anyone in Tibet who expressed his religious faith publicly was subject to persecution and accused of superstition. The Communists forced monks and nuns to have sex. The management of the monasteries was entrusted to the dissolute characters who "frequented prostitutes, drank heavily," thus discrediting the monasteries in the eyes of Tibetans.

According to the Tibet Justice Center, an organization linked to the Tibetan Government in Exile, Chinese officials have committed violence against Tibetan women by forcing them into prostitution. Tibetan teenagers, believing they were joining the People's Liberation Army, were reported to have suffered multiple rape, resulting in pregnancies for which they underwent forced abortions. This type of treatment is, according to the Tibet Justice Center, the norm for Tibetan girls in the Chinese army.

According to the dissident Chinese writer Wang Lixiong who lives in Beijing, these comments are greatly exaggerated and only occur in rare cases. In his book Sky Burial: The Destiny of Tibet, published in 1998, he wrote: "In the West, the persecution of Tibetans by the Chinese communists is greatly exaggerated. That the PLA soldiers forced the lamas and nuns to have sex publicly while Red Guards raped women everywhere, all this, of course, is far from the truth. As people who lived through that time know well, in this (Maoist) period, sex was seen as socially quite unacceptable. PLA soldiers and Red Guards, who had the strongest ideology, couldn't possibly have done this sort of thing. With regard to certain specific cases, we can only blame the individuals involved (nowhere is completely without such behaviour)."

== Current situation ==
According to the Tibetan government in exile, prostitution in Tibet is growing rapidly. They claim that the large-scale introduction of prostitution, especially to Lhasa and Tsetang, took place in 1990 as a result of the influx of a predominantly male working population which added to the large population of Chinese soldiers already deployed in Tibet. In an article in The Independent newspaper in 1996, journalist Mike Dempsey observed that prostitution in Lhasa had become "more brazen than in most other Chinese cities" and that "every street is full of bars and video arcades and brothels". "In some neighbourhoods of Lhasa... every third storefront is a brothel." Dempsey added that most of the prostitutes "are from nearby Szechuan [Sichuan]" while "Tibetan prostitutes, far fewer in number, service their poor clients in the rubbish-heaped alleys behind the Jokhang temple." In 2003 the journalist and historian Patrick French wrote that prostitution in Lhasa was "the subject of ethnic segregation". There were very few Tibetan prostitutes, the majority being Chinese, originally from Sichuan and Qinghai. The sex trade was "controlled by Chinese gangs who benefit from political protection". According to journalist Jean-Paul Mari, Jama Lingka island was developed in the 1990s with money from the Macao mafia.

In 2003, French documentary-maker Marie Louville visited Tibet in secret and filmed the documentary The Sidewalks of Lhassa which described the practice of prostitution in Lhasa. In 2006 the American photographer Sarah Schorr put on an exhibition of photographs of Tibetan and Chinese prostitutes taken in Lhasa.

In a report presented in 2009 to the United Nations Human Rights Council, the Association of Tibetan Women claimed that the previous decade had seen an increase in prostitution in some major cities of Tibet. The causes were said to be discrimination against Tibetan women in competition with Chinese women for education and employment, as well as increased tourism. But the most important factor was said to be the influx of soldiers in the strategically important region.

== Extent ==
The Chinese government does not give an estimate of the number of brothels in Tibet because prostitution is officially banned in China. However, estimated figures on the number of brothels in Lhasa are provided by a number of sources. These include organizations close to the Tibetan Government in Exile, the documentary filmmaker Ngawang Choephel, the academic Frederic Lenoir and the writer and historian Patrick French. The figures range from 300 to 1806 depending on the source. The term "brothel" covers prostitution taking place in premises disguised as hair salons, beauty salons, massage parlors, hostess bars and karaoke bars.

According to the Tibet Times, a fortnightly newspaper linked to Tibetan exiles with its headquarters in Dharamshala, there were about 8,890 prostitutes in Lhasa in 1998, or 9% of the female population. The article reported that there were 1,270 brothels in Lhasa, mostly disguised as hair salons, and on average, seven prostitutes in each brothel. Tibet Times claims to have obtained this figure as a result of its own direct investigations.

Ngawang Choephel, speaking on Voice of America in 1998, claimed that there were more than 1806 "Chinese brothels" in Lhasa. In 1999, the London-based Tibet Information Network conducted a study that identified "at least 658 brothels" in Lhasa. Patrick French returning from a trip to Tibet in 1999, indicated that he had found them to be an important phenomenon in Lhasa, and that "there are now hundreds of brothels there". In 2000 and 2002, a figure of 1000 brothels was put forward in a paper presented at the United Nations and in an article in The Boston Globe citing the same source. Between 1998 and 2005 the number of brothels increased to 1600, according to the Tibetan Women's Association. In 2008 Frederic Lenoir estimated the number of brothels in Lhasa at more than 300 brothels, one of the highest rates of any Chinese city in terms of population.

There are reports of prostitution outside the capital Lhasa, with Michael Kodas describing its practice at the Tibetan Everest Base Camp in his book High Crimes: The Fate of Everest in an Age of Greed (2008).

== Official suppression of prostitution ==
Prostitution is illegal under the law of the People's Republic of China. Chinese authorities often denounce prostitution and frequently launch raids in an attempt to rid Tibet of the trade, such as the action against vice in Lhasa in May 1995 when Chinese police arrested 111 prostitutes and pimps. According to Agence France-Presse, Sun Jiazheng, Chinese Minister of Culture 1998–2008, warned in 2000 that the development of the Chinese entertainment industry might be inhibited due to competition from the sex trade. He launched a national campaign to prevent this and accused government agencies of taking part in the trade. On 1 October 2009, as the 60th anniversary of the founding of the People's Republic of China approached, the Chinese Vice-Minister of Justice announced the launch of a national campaign by the Chinese police aimed at closing nightclubs and massage parlours.

== Risk of the spread of sexually transmitted disease ==
In 2003, the Tibetan Centre for Human Rights and Democracy, an NGO for which the Dalai Lama is the patron, estimated that there were 7000 Tibetan girls in 1000 brothels in Lhasa in the year 2000. The organisation criticised the lack of hygiene and protective measures, the influx of prostitutes from the rest of China where AIDS is more prevalent, and the lack of preventative educational and screening programs. Increases in prostitution are said to lead to increased HIV transmission in Tibet. In 2007, the Dalai Lama claimed that Beijing was using the recently completed Qingzang railway between China and Tibet to sending uneducated young girls from the countryside to be "inducted as prostitutes" in Lhasa which "is increasing the danger of AIDS".

The Australian organisations (AusAID and the Burnet Institute) work in Lhasa on the prevention of HIV/AIDS. During the 2008 Tibetan unrest one of their staff, an AIDS worker and former Tibetan monk named Wangdu was arrested. He had been working since 2001 on AIDS prevention, especially among prostitutes. Despite his not having personally participated in the Lhasa demonstrations he was sentenced to life imprisonment on charges of espionage and sending information abroad. According to the association Students for a Free Tibet, his imprisonment shows how far the Chinese government will go to silence those working for the health and well-being of Tibetans.

== Prostitution and Tibetan culture ==
As Lhasa is a holy city for Tibetans, prostitution is particularly frowned upon by its Tibetan population, according to Lobsang Sangay. In "Lhasa: the Death of the Soul", a 1994 article, William Hanks quotes a Buddhist monk's words: "A monk in a monastery doorway murmured to me 'It's a shame; we want these bars to close because they contribute to the planned destruction of Tibetan culture'". The travel comparator website Easyvoyage mentions that the western part of Lhasa looks like all modern Chinese cities with its concrete architecture, shops, karaoke and even prostitution. The French interpreter for the Dalai Lama, Mathieu Ricard says that "the Tibetan town has disappeared beneath the neon karaoke... the Chinese impose their morals, alcohol, karaoke, brothels... China imposes its dogmas and crushes the culture!"

However, as Mike Dempsey comments: "most observers of Tibet doubt it is official Chinese policy to promote gambling and prostitution in order to undermine the exiled Dalai Lama's spiritual hold". The view of professor Barry Sautman of the Hong Kong University of Science and Technology is that "Emigrés try to attribute the 'vices' found in the towns of Tibet to the harmful cultural effects of the Han presence there. But Lhasa, like many other towns around the world, contains many places teeming with prostitution, gambling and drugs". The Director of the International Campaign for Tibet has expressed "concern that more and more young Tibetans are exposed to the temptations of the worst aspects of Chinese culture". Sautman points out that "none of these vices is particularly 'Chinese'. Billiards is a Western invention, karaoke originated in Japan, prostitution and drugs are universal." Asked about discos and nightclubs in Lhasa, the Vice-President of the Tibet Autonomous Region justified them as part of the "western way of life," adding that they contribute to the diversity of local Tibetan and Han culture. Sautman argues that the 'vices' in Tibet denounced by émigrés are mostly also present in religious centers such as Dharamshala and Kathmandu and not uncommon amongst Buddhist monks in some countries".

== Bibliography ==
- French, Patrick (2003). Tibet, Tibet: A Personal History Of A Lost Land. Harper Perennial. ISBN 9780007177554.
- Sautman, Barry (1 April 2003). ""Cultural Genocide" and Tibet" (PDF). Texas International Law Journal. 38 (173): 174–248. Archived from the original (PDF) on 7 April 2014.

== See also ==
- Prostitution
- Prostitution in China
