= Hu Jia (activist) =

Chinese activist

- 胡佳
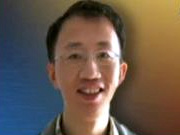
- Born: July 25, 1973 (age 52); Beijing, China
- Occupation: Human rights activist
- Known for: Environmentalist movement, HIV/AIDS activism
- Spouse: Zeng Jinyan

Hu Jia (Chinese: 胡佳; pinyin: Hú Jiā; born July 25, 1973) is a Chinese civil rights activist and critic of the Chinese Communist Party. His work has focused on the Chinese democracy movement, Chinese environmentalist movement, and HIV/AIDS in the People's Republic of China. Hu is the director of June Fourth Heritage & Culture Association, and he has been involved with AIDS advocacy as the executive director of the Beijing Aizhixing Institute of Health Education and as one of the founders of the non-governmental organization Loving Source. He has also been involved in work to protect the endangered Tibetan antelope. For his activism, Hu has received awards from several European bodies, such as the Paris City Council and the European Parliament, which awarded the Sakharov Prize for Freedom of Thought to him in December 2008.

On December 27, 2007, Hu was detained as part of a crackdown on dissent during the Christmas holiday season. Reporters Without Borders said that "The political police have taken advantage of the international community's focus on Pakistan to arrest one of the foremost representatives of the peaceful struggle for free expression in China." The decision to take him into custody was made after peasant leaders in several Chinese provinces issued a manifesto demanding broader land rights for peasants whose property had been confiscated for development. On April 3, 2008, he was sentenced to 3.5 years in jail. Hu pleaded not guilty on charges of "inciting subversion of state power" at his trial in March 2008. His trial and detention garnered international attention, and Hu was described as a political prisoner, and was designated a prisoner of conscience by Amnesty International. He was released on June 26, 2011.

== Early life and family ==
Hu's parents were students at Tsinghua University in Beijing and Nankai University in Tianjin. In 1957, Hu's father repeated information in school that there was a famine in Anhui, his hometown, and that people were starving to death. The university's party committee said that Hu's father was spreading rumors, insulting socialism, and insulting China. For this, Hu's father was labeled a rightist. Hu's parents both were labeled as rightists during the Anti-Rightist Movement under Mao Zedong and were assigned to work in remote provinces of Hebei, Gansu, and Hunan. In the 1980s, Deng Xiaoping ended Maoism and Hu's parents were allowed return to Beijing and live together.

In 1996 Hu graduated from the Beijing School of Economics (now Capital University of Economics and Trade).

== Activism ==
Hu participated in the 1989 Tiananmen protests when he was 15 years old. On the night of June 3, Hu's father, who had seen internal documents, blocked Hu from leaving the house.

Hu became interested in environmental issues while in university and participated in several environmental organizations including the Friends of Nature, led by Liang Congjie, and the 1997 Green Camp university student environmental camp led by Tang Xiyang. In 1998 Hu Jia was involved in rescuing some wild elk that were threatened by severe flooding that year. Hu was subsequently involved in efforts to protect the Tibetan antelopes that were being slaughtered for their fur.

Hu has also been involved in campaigns to release political prisoners, including Liu Di. In 2005 he participated in anti-Japanese demonstrations.

=== HIV/AIDS work ===
Hu advocated for people with AIDS and cofounded the Aizhixing Institute of Health Education. He is also the cofounder of Loving Source, which is an organization that assists children whose parents have died due to illnesses related to AIDS. He later resigned from Loving Source to prevent harassment from authorities, saying that some international donors withdrew support in the midst of pressure from the Chinese government and that the organization's volunteers had been intimidated.

=== Detainments and house arrests ===
In 2004, Hu was detained several times to prevent him from publicly commemorating the 15th anniversary of the 1989 Tiananmen Square protests and massacre. In 2006, Hu was placed under house arrest for 168 days.

In February 2006, Hu and hundreds of Chinese dissidents staged hunger strikes in support of a protest that was started by Gao Zhisheng. On February 16, 2006, Hu was detained for 41 days. His wife started a blog about the steps she took in trying to locate him and the reasons why he was detained. She had repeatedly asked authorities about Hu's location, but they consistently said they did not know. Hu reportedly had Hepatitis B and needed to take medication every day. After Hu was released he said that had repeatedly asked the police for the medication from his home, but they refused.

Hu Jia was kept under house arrest for 214 days from August 2006 until March 2007. Two months later, before boarding a flight to Europe on May 18, 2007, Hu Jia and his wife were placed under house arrest again.

Using a web camera, Hu participated in a European parliamentary hearing in Brussels in November 2007 about human rights in China. At the hearing he said: "It is ironic that one of the people in charge of organizing the Olympic Games is the head of the Bureau of Public Security, which is responsible for so many human rights violations. It is very serious that the official promises are not being kept before the games."

=== Imprisonment ===
On December 27, 2007, Hu was arrested at his home in Beijing by the Chinese police for "inciting subversion of state authority". His trial began in March 2008 on charges of "inciting subversion of state power and the socialist system", stemming from interviews he gave to the foreign media and political articles he wrote and published on the internet. The crime carries a maximum sentence of five years in prison. On April 3, 2008, Hu was sentenced to three years and six months in prison.

Hu's wife Zeng Jinyan, after an April 2009 prison visit with Hu Jia, noted that his health is deteriorating because of inadequate nutrition and medical care.

==== Illness ====
Hu was thought to be suffering from a liver condition. In April 2010, Hu's family got to know that he was sent to prison hospital for medical check of symptoms suspected to be liver cancer but no information of the medical report was released to his family. Hu's wife Ms Zeng requested for the detailed medical report but was denied access. She and Hu's mother requested for medical parole but the prison administration rejected by saying that Hu's disease is not liver cancer, and he might not be released for medical care even if he had liver cancer.

On April 7, Ms Zeng published an open letter on Internet, requesting medical parole of Mr. Hu. Shortly later, Ms Ai Xiaoming and Ms Cui Weiping, two renowned university professors who are also active in human rights activities, published an open letter on Internet, appealing public support for Ms Zeng's request of medical parole of Mr. Hu. In less than 10 days, over 700 people endorsed the open letter through email and web forms.

Hu was released from custody on June 26, 2011. He was diagnosed with acute pancreatitis.

== Personal life ==
In January 2006 Hu married Zeng Jinyan, with whom he has a daughter. Zeng was included in Time magazine's 100 Heroes and Pioneers for her blogging after his arrest in February 2008 for voicing his indignation at China as the host of the 2008 Summer Olympics. Both his wife and daughter were held in house arrest and harassed by the Ministry of State Security, and disappeared one day before the opening ceremony in Beijing. Hu and his wife separated in 2012.

Hu is a Buddhist of the Tibetan tradition and began to practice Buddhism after the student uprisings.

== Personal and political views ==
Regarding China's bid in 2013 to be elected to the United Nations Human Rights Council, Hu said, "Allowing China to become a member of the UN Human Rights Council is like a making an executioner a judge, that's ridiculous."

After CCP member Zhou Yongkang was expelled from the party after being accused of alleged corruption, Hu commented on the anti-corruption campaign under Xi Jinping stating "Zhou challenged Xi's authority and threatened his rule – that's why he's now being held responsible along with his gangs. The bottom line is: All officials are corrupt. Xi can't find a better excuse to rid of his political opponents than fighting corruption – something that helps him win the masses' hearts and minds." Hu has previously criticized Wang Qishan saying, "His family has a lot of money too. They're not really attacking corruption now. It's not hunting tigers, it's just tigers eating tigers."

== Awards and honors ==
Hu was made an honorary citizen of Paris on April 21, 2008, the same day as was the 14th Dalai Lama. On October 23, 2008, the European Parliament announced that its Sakharov Prize for Freedom of Thought would be awarded to Hu Jia in December 2008.

== See also ==
- Human rights in the People's Republic of China
