= Zhang Beichuan =

Zhang Beichuan (Chinese: 张北川; pinyin: zhāng běi chuān) is a Chinese medical researcher, dermatologist, LGBT activist and AIDS prevention specialist.

== Life and career ==
Beichuan studied dermatology under Qin Shide in Qingdao University, then branched off and pursued the study of LGBT issues after seeing his teacher being discriminated based due to his teacher's sexual orientation.

In 1994, he published the book Homosexual Love (Chinese: 同性爱), the first comprehensive study on homosexuality in modern China. After publishing the book, he received around 1,000 letters from gay people all around China. These letters and the support of Qin Shide finally made him decide to quit his career as a dermatologist and start focusing on preventive healthcare for the homosexual population, especially in response to the AIDS pandemic.

In 1998, Zhang created the health prevention project for gay people, "Friends (Chinese: 朋友)", with the support of the Ford Foundation. In the same year, he published the monthly health resource pamphlet, "Friends Communications (Chinese: 朋友通信)". His presentation in the Xiangshan Science Conference encourage the Chinese Ministry of Health to divert funding to combat the spread of AIDS among gay men.

In 2002, the United Nation acknowledged the "Friends" project in their document about the AIDS pandemic. Zhang was awarded the Barry & Martin award for his work on AIDS prevention.

== See also ==
- HIV/AIDS in China
- Prevention of HIV/AIDS
- Homosexuality in China
