= Tang Xiyang =

Chinese environmentalist (1930–2022)

Tang Xiyang (唐錫陽; 30 January 1930 – 3 November 2022) was a Chinese environmentalist. He was awarded the 2007 Ramon Magsaysay Award for Peace and International Understanding.

== Biography ==
Tang Xiyang was born in Miluo, Hunan Province on 30 January 1930. He graduated from Beijing Normal University and then worked as a journalist for a Beijing newspaper from 1952 to 1957. Condemned as a rightist in 1957, Tang was forced to work in factories and on farms in the Beijing area until his rehabilitation in 1979. During the Cultural Revolution, his first wife, Zheng Zhaonan (郑兆南), struggled at her school because she was beaten severely, humiliated and cruelly mistreated for 47 days by the middle school's Red Guards for being anti-Party and counter-revolutionary as a result. She was refused medical care and died of her injuries. Her refusal to denounce her husband Tang Xiyang as a rightist, and her landlord family background were likely important reasons for the ferocity of the attacks on her. Zheng Zhaonan's posthumously published letter explaining her political position became well known.

Tang died on 3 November 2022, at the age of 92.

== Book ==
In 1980 he founded Great Nature magazine, and later he wrote the book A Green World Tour, which has become important for China's younger environmentalists. Tang met his second wife, Marsha Marks of New York, in 1981 and began a long collaboration which ended with her death in July 1996.

A Green World Tour was published in English translation in 1999. In some of the passages, Tang Xiyang discussed his experience of the Anti-Rightist Movement and the Cultural Revolution with Americans during his visit to the United States:

Tang believed that Chinese shortcomings in the areas of human rights and democracy are among the most important causes not only of human tragedy but also environmental devastation. A Green World Tour does not touch often on political topics, but these portions were heavily censored.

== Green Camp ==
In the first Green Camp in 1996, Tang took a group of college students to ethnic Tibetan areas of Yunnan Province where timber companies had clear-cut many mountainsides. In December 1995, the students created the "Save the Snub-nosed monkey" campaign and planned their first joint environmental action. The student environmental protection organizations, which by the Spring of 1996 had several hundred members each, prepared for a summer 1996 'Long March' to save the Snub-nosed Monkey through environmental education, and fund-raising campaigns on campus. The efforts of the students were reporting interviews in the Chinese press and television. From July 25 to August 25, twenty-two college students, master's degree students and PhD candidates from Beijing, Kunming, Yunnan, and Harbin along with ten journalists traveled in the Baima Xueshan area under the leadership of Tang Xiyang. The group aimed to learn how to protect the Snub-nosed monkey by studying the ecology, economics and society of the very poor Tibetan minority region on near China's international boundary with Burma and Yunnan Province's internal border with the Tibetan Autonomous Region.

After their trek through the forests of Deqin, the students had meetings with county officials and then with Yunnan Province officials in Kunming. When they presented their report to government officials, including representatives of the Ministry of Forestry and environmental officials, the students were attacked by the Forestry officials and praised by the environmental officials. The student trip got extensive coverage in Chinese media. Ten press and television journalists accompanied the students. Chinese media reports pointed to the slash-and-burn agriculture of the local people as the cause of the devastation of the Snub-nosed monkey habitat, but did not mention the much more important role of the Deqin County timber company. Although the threat to the Snub-nosed monkeys of Deqin County has passed, the students fear that unrestrained clear-cutting in nearby areas will continue to cause severe environmental damage. From 1996 he has been organizing "Green Camps", which in turn has led to spin-off camps in many parts of China. The last years he has been a tireless lecturer; in 2005 alone he delivered 130 lectures in 17 cities.
