= Cui Weiping =

Chinese film professor and social critic

Cui Weiping (崔卫平) is a Beijing Film Academy professor and social critic. She was born in Jiangsu province. She is a famous scholar, professional translator and cultural critic.
