= HIV/AIDS in Yunnan =

Reported HIV cases in all Chinese provinces, 2005.

The People's Republic of China's first reported AIDS case was identified in 1985 in a dying tourist. In 1989, the first indigenous cases were reported as an outbreak in 146 infected heroin users in Yunnan province, near China's southwest border.

Yunnan is the area most affected by HIV/AIDS in China. In 1989 first infections appeared among needle sharing drug users near the Burmese border. Up until 1993, the disease had remained a problem in the border areas before mobile people (truck drivers, construction and migrant workers and travelers) brought the virus further into the country. In 1995, the provinces of Sichuan and Xinjiang reported their first HIV cases, and by 1998, the virus had spread all over China.

Low awareness of the disease among China's general population appears to be a major culprit. Most Chinese consider HIV/AIDS as a foreign issue, and even educated people are less knowledgeable of the virus, its transmission and prevention, than people in other countries. Until recently, the use of condoms was not very common, even among sex workers and their clients. As a result, the epidemic has spread from high-risk groups (drug users, sex workers, unsafe blood donors) to the general population.

== Heroin flow ==
Heroin flows into Yunnan Province from neighboring Vietnam, Laos, and Myanmar, bringing with it HIV. The province's first cases were reported in 1989. With a population of 44 million, Yunnan now has only 200 health workers trained for the disease. Officials estimate that the province has 80,000 infected people, most of them intravenous drug users who have spread the disease by sharing needles. In Gejiu, a city of 310,000 people on a route favored by drug traffickers, initial rounds of AIDS testing in recent years found more than 1,000 people with HIV, nearly all drug users or prostitutes. Unlike some other provinces, Yunnan has welcomed international nonprofit groups and support from Britain, Australia, and more recently the United States.

== '3 Needles' ==
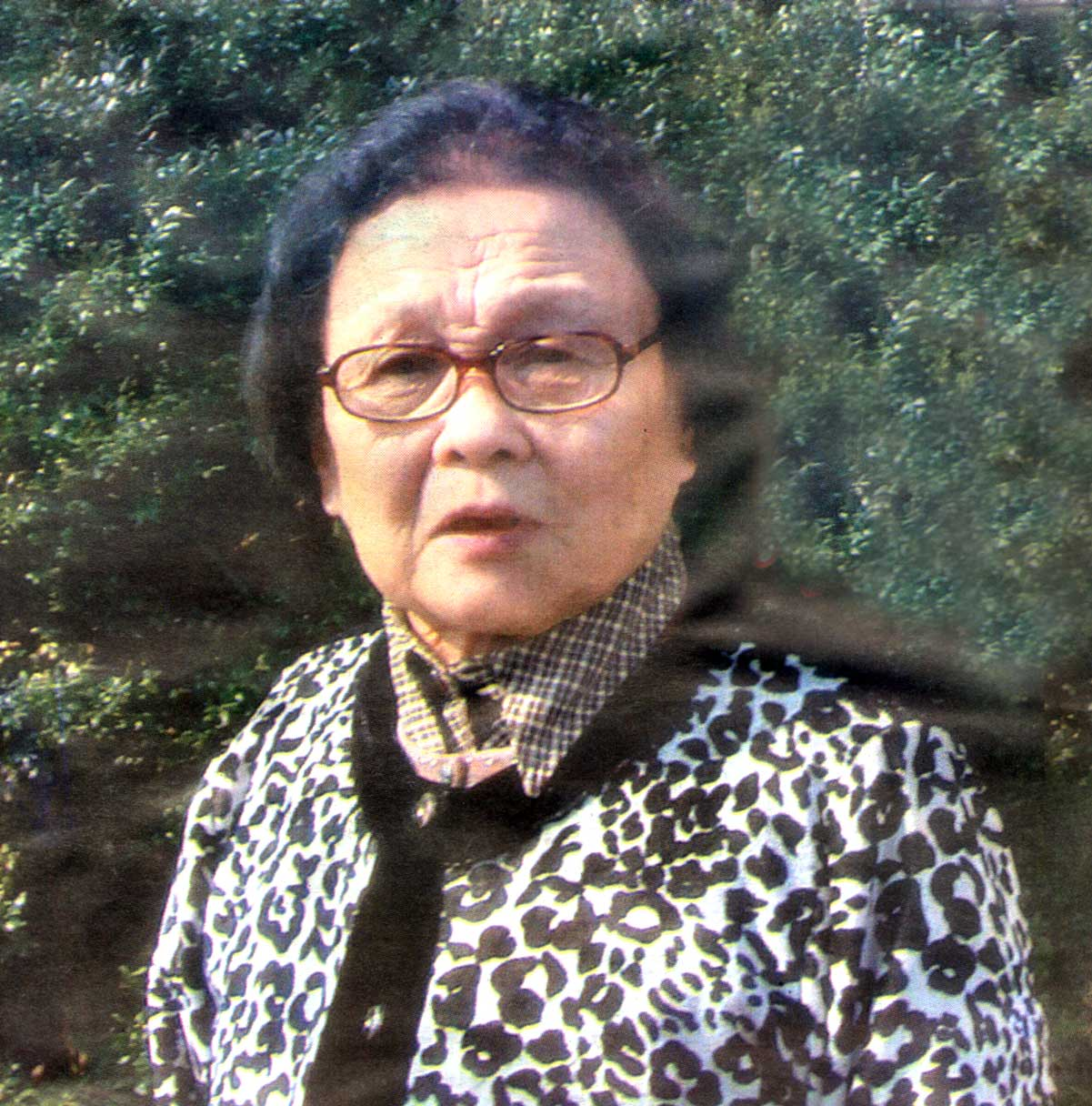
Dr. Gao Yaojie, a gynecologist and AIDS activist from Henan province.

3 Needles is a 2005 dramatic film depicting the lives of people in Yunnan during the HIV/AIDS epidemic. One of the film's protagonists, a pregnant black-market operative played by Lucy Liu, makes her living as a blood smuggler. But when several blood donors begin to get sick and die, she realizes that she may have jeopardized the health of the village's safety and beyond. 3 Needles is an attempt to visualize the profound experience of Gao Yaojie and many others as we can read in The New York Times sequel.

== Needle exchange ==
Since 2001, the State Council of the People's Republic of China has officially advocated needle social marketing as an HIV prevention measure. Evidence from research and study tours to countries such as Australia, which runs successful needle exchange programmes, prompted the Ministry of Health (China) to support the first such programme in Yunnan province and Guangxi Zhuang Autonomous Region in 1999. On the basis of the successes of the pilot, the programme was expanded in 2004, and plans are in place to open an additional 1500 methadone maintenance treatment clinics for about 300 000 heroin users by 2008. A National Training Centre for methadone maintenance treatment has been established in Yunnan to provide clinical and technical support.

== Commercial sex ==
Commercial sex work is illegal in the People's Republic of China; hence, brothels are illegal and commercial sex workers operate out of places of entertainment (e.g., karaoke bars), hotels, hair-dressing salons, or on the street. The traditional strategy for controlling HIV transmission through commercial sex workers has been the development of stricter laws to prevent risky behaviours, accompanied by raids on suspected sex establishments by public security officials. In 1996–97, following the success of prevention interventions in neighbouring Thailand, the Chinese Center for Disease Control and Prevention launched the first intervention projects to promote safer sex behaviours to prevent HIV and other sexually transmitted diseases in commercial sex workers working at entertainment establishments in Yunnan.

== Numbers ==
In 2002, a United Nations-commissioned report, entitled China's Titanic peril, estimating that the People's Republic of China had about 1 million cases of HIV, and that it was on the brink of an "explosive HIV/AIDS epidemic…with an imminent risk to widespread dissemination to the general population". The report continued: "a potential HIV/AIDS disaster of unimaginable proportion now lies in wait." A few months later, the US National Intelligence Council estimated that 1-2 million people were living with HIV in People's Republic of China, and predicted 10–15 million cases by 2010.

Other reports at this time were similarly pessimistic: from the Center for Strategic and International Studies (Washington, DC, USA), HIV/AIDS was referred to as China's time-bomb; and from the American Enterprise Institute as the AIDS typhoon. However, as Wu and colleagues note, by 2006 the number of people living with HIV/AIDS is estimated to be 650,000—a figure revised downwards by 200,000 from 2005.

After a slow start and reluctance to recognise the existence of risk activities in its population and of the HIV epidemic, China has responded to international influences, media coverage, and scientific evidence to take bold steps to control the epidemic, using scientifically validated strategies. A Joint Assessment of HIV/AIDS Prevention, Treatment and Care in China (2004), developed jointly by UNAIDS and the State Council of the People's Republic of China, estimated that the country had 840,000 people living with HIV/AIDS. This figure was revised down to 650,000 in 2005 in light of more representative data collection and more appropriate estimation methods.

== Yunnan ahead ==
Yunnan province has shown strong support for implementation and advocacy of harm-reduction strategies that reduce HIV transmission in its many drug users, whereas Henan province had been slower to respond to the needs of former plasma donors in the early stages of the epidemic. The distribution of HIV in China is not even, and is concentrated in areas with high drug use (i.e. Yunnan, Guangxi, Xinjiang, and Sichuan) and in areas where people were infected through unsafe blood or plasma donation (i.e. Henan, Anhui, Hebei, Shanxi, and Hubei). The number of cases ranges dramatically between provinces (see the map of China on your right), with, for example, just 20 cases reported from Tibet but well over 40,000 in neighbouring Yunnan.

== Yunnan Red Cross ==
The Yunnan Red Cross was one of the first non-government organizations fighting HIV/AIDS in China. It was established in 1994, as an adaptation of the Australian Red Cross, and is operating five projects in various locations throughout the province.

== See also ==
- HIV/AIDS in the People's Republic of China
- Gao Yaojie
- Yunnan Institute of Development (YID)
