= HIV/AIDS in China =

HIV/AIDS in China can be traced to an initial outbreak of the human immunodeficiency virus (HIV) first recognized in 1989 among injecting drug users along China's southern border. Figures from the Chinese Center for Disease Control and Prevention, World Health Organization, and UNAIDS estimate that there were 1.25 million people living with HIV/AIDS in China at the end of 2018, with 135,000 new infections from 2017. The reported incidence of HIV/AIDS in China is relatively low, but the Chinese government anticipates that the number of individuals infected annually will continue to increase.

While HIV is a type of sexually transmitted infection, the first years of the epidemic in China were dominated by non-sexual transmission routes, particularly among users of intravenous drugs through practices such as needle sharing. By 2005, 50% of new HIV cases were due to sexual transmission, with heterosexual sex gradually becoming the most common means of new infections in the 2000s. New infections among men who have sex with men (MSMs) grew rapidly thereafter, representing 26% of all new cases in 2014, up from 2.5% in 2006. Another major, non-sexual channel of infection was the Plasma Economy of the 1990s, wherein large numbers of blood donors, primarily in poor, rural areas in Henan Province, were infected with HIV as a result of systematically dangerous practices by state and private blood collection clinics.

== History ==
=== Global background ===
HIV evolved from the simian immunodeficiency virus (SIV), present in numerous species of primates in West Africa and Central Africa, in the early 20th century. SIV jumped from primates to humans several times, although the primary strain of HIV responsible for the global pandemic, HIV-1 group M, is traceable to the region surrounding Kinshasa, likely having initially crossed from chimpanzees around 1920. From there, it spread to the Caribbean around 1967, proceeding to establish itself in New York City and San Francisco circa 1971 and 1976, respectively.

The US Centers for Disease Control and Prevention (CDC) recognized unusual outbreaks of opportunistic infections among gay men in 1981, and the disease was initially referred to as gay-related immune deficiency (GRID), although it was quickly understood to also infect heterosexuals as well. In 1982, the CDC adopted the name "acquired immune deficiency syndrome" (AIDS). By the end of 1984, 7,699 cases of AIDS and 3,665 deaths had been recorded in America, with an additional cases 762 in Europe. By the end following year, over 20,000 cases were recorded globally, reaching every inhabited region in the world.

=== Early stages of the epidemic in China ===
The first recorded death in China due to AIDS was a male Argentine-American tourist and California resident who died in Beijing on 6 June 1985. The Chinese government focused initially on preventing foreigners from transmitting the disease to its citizens, viewing it primarily as a consequence of a Western lifestyle.

By 1998, HIV/AIDS was present in all 31 provinces and administrative regions of China, and government statistics indicated 60–70% of those infected were drug users. Other major modes of transmission included infected blood spread through blood donation clinics across the country and the sex trade. Before either of these routes of infection were identified, however, a handful of people contracted HIV after receiving transfusions of contaminated hemophilia blood products from the United States.

==== Contaminated blood imports ====
Through the early 1980s, multiple American pharmaceutical firms exported medical blood products contaminated with HIV to East Asia. Bayer Corporation exported plasma knowing the risks of HIV transmission, resulting in over one hundred infections in Taiwan and Hong Kong. Factorate, a Factor VIII product of Armour Pharmaceuticals Company, was imported to China and used in blood transfusions in 19 people in Zhejiang province between 1983 and 1985. Four of the recipients, all hemophiliacs, were infected with HIV, making them at the time the first identified cases of native Chinese infected within the country's borders. Armour had been aware that original sterilization methods for Factorate were inadequate since at least 1985.

The Chinese government reacted to the threat of HIV in the blood supply before any confirmed cases of infection had occurred. In September 1984, the Chinese Ministry of Health, in conjunction with the Ministry of Foreign Economic Relations and Trade (now the Ministry of Commerce) and the General Administration of Customs, issued a notice restricting imports on foreign blood products, including a complete ban on blood coagulation factors, specifically to prevent HIV/AIDS from entering the country. The bans were poorly enforced by some local governments, prompting central authorities in August 1985 to issue another notice nationwide, reiterating the ban and ordering all sub-national governments to comply. On 30 January 1986, all blood products, with the sole exception of human serum albumin, were banned from import into China for both organizational and personal use.

==== Southern intravenous drug users ====
In 1989, central authorities became aware of a large outbreak of HIV/AIDS in western Yunnan province, in the border city of Ruili. 146 cases had been identified, mostly in injection drug users (IDUs), and Yunnan soon became the most heavily impacted province in China. The outbreak was the first instance of a widespread, native infection in China, and stunned officials previously concerned mainly with preventing infection through sexual contact with foreigners.

Yunnan borders the Golden Triangle region of Southeast Asia and has been a major hub for drug trafficking. HIV likely crossed into China along heroin trafficking routes from Myanmar. As heroin grew in popularity in Chinese border regions, injections with used needles became more common, greatly accelerating the rate of infection. The disease spread over the next several years, confined mainly to drug using populations of ethnic minorities in poorer, rural areas, reaching other high-risk groups and provinces by 1995.

Sichuan and Xinjiang first reported HIV outbreaks among injection drug users in 1995, the first two provinces besides Yunnan to do so. The following year, cases were confirmed in Guangdong, Guangxi, Beijing, Shanghai, and Guizhou. Additionally, an independent outbreak of a separate sub-strain of HIV among IDUs began in 1997 in the city of Pingxiang, Guangxi. Drug users crossed the border into northern Vietnam, where heroin was similarly smuggled in from Myanmar, and shared needles with Vietnamese dealers and users to test purchases before returning to China.

==== Bloodhead controversy ====
Unique to China was the large-scale transmission of HIV through blood donation centers in the early to mid-1990s. The ban on blood product imports from the preceding decade restricted China's blood supply, making blood donation more lucrative, particularly for inadequately funded rural healthcare systems already weakened by privatization. Additionally, medicines containing blood plasma became popular among Chinese consumers, also contributing to demand for blood. By 1990, thousands of public and commercial blood and blood plasma collection centers had been established across China, attracting donors with payments that could equal over a month's worth of income for some farmers. A significant grey market of poorly regulated "bloodheads" (simplified Chinese: 血头; traditional Chinese: 血頭, xuètóu, coll. xiětóu) concurrently arose.

The unsanitary practices in the blood market led to massive propagation of the HIV virus among rural populations. Donation centers frequently recycled needles, mixed blood donations without screening, and failed to adequately sterilize equipment, spreading blood-borne disease to both donors and recipients. For plasma donations, blood was often mixed with other donors' samples and reinjected after plasma extraction. Wu, Rou, and Detels (2001) found that 12.5% of plasma donors in eastern China tested positive for HIV, compared to 1.3% of non-donors; infected donors spread the disease to marital and other sexual partners.

In 2004, official estimates put the number of people infected via unsafe blood donation practices across the most heavily impacted provinces—Henan, Hebei, Anhui, Shaanxi, and Shanxi—between 200,000 and 300,000. Gansu and Qinghai also reported infections stemming from the commercial blood trade during the same time period. Overall, 24% of all HIV/AIDS cases in China in 2004 had been attributed to blood donation and related activities.

The phenomenon was especially prevalent in Henan, where it was promoted by local officials, including Henan Ministry of Health director Liu Quanxi and provincial Communist Party Secretary Li Changchun, to promote economic growth. An internal report compiled in August 2002 by the Henan Ministry of Health, leaked by prominent AIDS activist Wan Yanhai, estimated that 35–45% of blood donors in some areas of the province had been infected due to poor safety precautions in clinics.

The Chinese government was slow to admit and respond to the problem after it was identified, and initially repressed efforts to expose it. Shuping Wang and Gao Yaojie, two female doctors from Henan, mounted campaigns to expose the dangerous practices they saw in the early 1990s that put donors at risk for HIV infection. The central government eventually ordered commercial clinics to be shut down in 1995, reopening them in 1997 after stronger regulations on blood donation practices were instituted, although there is evidence that dangerous and unhygienic practices were not eliminated.

Both Gao and Wang eventually left China for the United States, citing apparent government harassment and intimidation resulting from their advocacy efforts. Even after acknowledging the issue, central and local government bodies sought to suppress discussion or coverage. Wan Yanhai was arrested in 2003 for attempting to screen a movie about the scandal in Beijing. In 2004, while acknowledging some victims had contracted HIV because of inadequate hygiene in blood donation centers and agreeing to provide compensation, authorities still sought to classify such infections as resultant of use of drugs or prostitution in official records.

==== Sex trade ====
While the majority of early infections occurred as a result of intravenous injection transmission or tainted blood supplies, prostitution also played a role spreading HIV/AIDS. China's economy rapidly grew as a result of the reform and opening up policies, and patronage of commercial sex workers, many of whom were injecting drug users, grew among both wealthy businessman and migrant worker populations, bringing HIV back to their hometowns and other cities. Overall, however, the commercial sex industry was not as major a vehicle of transmission as drug injection and blood donation were, and HIV infection rates among female sex workers remained relatively low throughout the 2010s.

== Epidemiology ==
Estimates from the Chinese Center for Disease Control and Prevention, World Health Organization, and UNAIDS calculated approximately 1.25 million people living with HIV/AIDS in China at the end of 2018, with 135,000 new infections over the previous year. It was by far the deadliest notifiable disease of 2018, killing 18,780 individuals, compared to 3,149 for tuberculosis, the second-most deadly. According to the People's Daily in 2018, the official newspaper of the Central Committee of the Chinese Communist Party, the government expects infections to continue to accelerate.

Distribution of new infections, 2005 & 2015

25,266 HIV infections were recorded in 2005, with the most (4750) in Yunnan, and only one recorded in Tibet. (Hong Kong and Macau not included.)

81,696 HIV infections were recorded in 2015, with the most (13,457) in Sichuan and the least (148) in Tibet.

=== Data collection and reliability ===
Data on HIV/AIDS up through the early 2000s was very imprecise. Passive disease surveillance methods were established in 1986, with local clinics and medical providers reporting confirmed cases progressively through district, city, and provincial channels, and then ultimately to three separate national agencies under the Ministry of Health. The Chinese government did not begin active surveillance and systematic data collection until 1995, when 42 national surveillance sites were established in 23 provincial-level regions with the help of the World Health Organization. By 2006, China had achieved comprehensive HIV/AIDS surveillance nationwide, following expansion of the surveillance network to over 300 sites and reforms of the national reporting systems, although rural areas remained under-covered. By 2010, 1888 surveillance sites had been established.

Data from before the development of comprehensive surveillance suffered a number of shortcomings, including minimal coverage of the general population due to focus on high-risk groups, poor data on men who have sex with men (MSM), stovepiping among different government entities, and difficulties obtaining data from private healthcare providers. Through the early 2000s, the Chinese government limited discussion of data and statistics of HIV/AIDS in the country, and media only reported numbers approved by the government.

Accordingly, estimates from the period of the epidemic often were imprecise, tending to overestimate the overall number of cases. China did not begin to produce regular, systematic estimates of the prevalence of HIV/AIDS until 2003, doing so in conjunction with the United Nations, World Health Organization, and United States Centers for Disease Control. This initial estimate was tentatively 840,000 cases nationwide, but with a potential range of 430,000 to 1.5 million. This was revised down to 650,000 in 2005.

Other international estimates tended to greatly overstate the presence and potential growth of HIV in China before more reliable official data was available. For example, in 2002, a report by the United Nations Theme Group on HIV/AIDS in China, entitled "HIV/AIDS: China's Titanic Peril", had estimated up to 1.5 million infected cases, and warned of "[a] potential HIV/AIDS disaster of unimaginable proportion". A 2002 report by the US National Intelligence Council projected 10–15 million cases in China by 2010.

Overall, the availability, precision, and coverage of HIV/AIDS data in China improved significantly from 2003 onward. Beginning in 2010, the Chinese government again expanded the scope and number of HIV surveillance sites, increasing coverage of all groups and expanding to cover larger portions of the population and providing more comprehensive information on the disease. Data gathered through the current system has generally been reliable, although issues with standardized protocols across different sites and coordination among different levels of government were identified in independent studies.

=== Current transmission ===
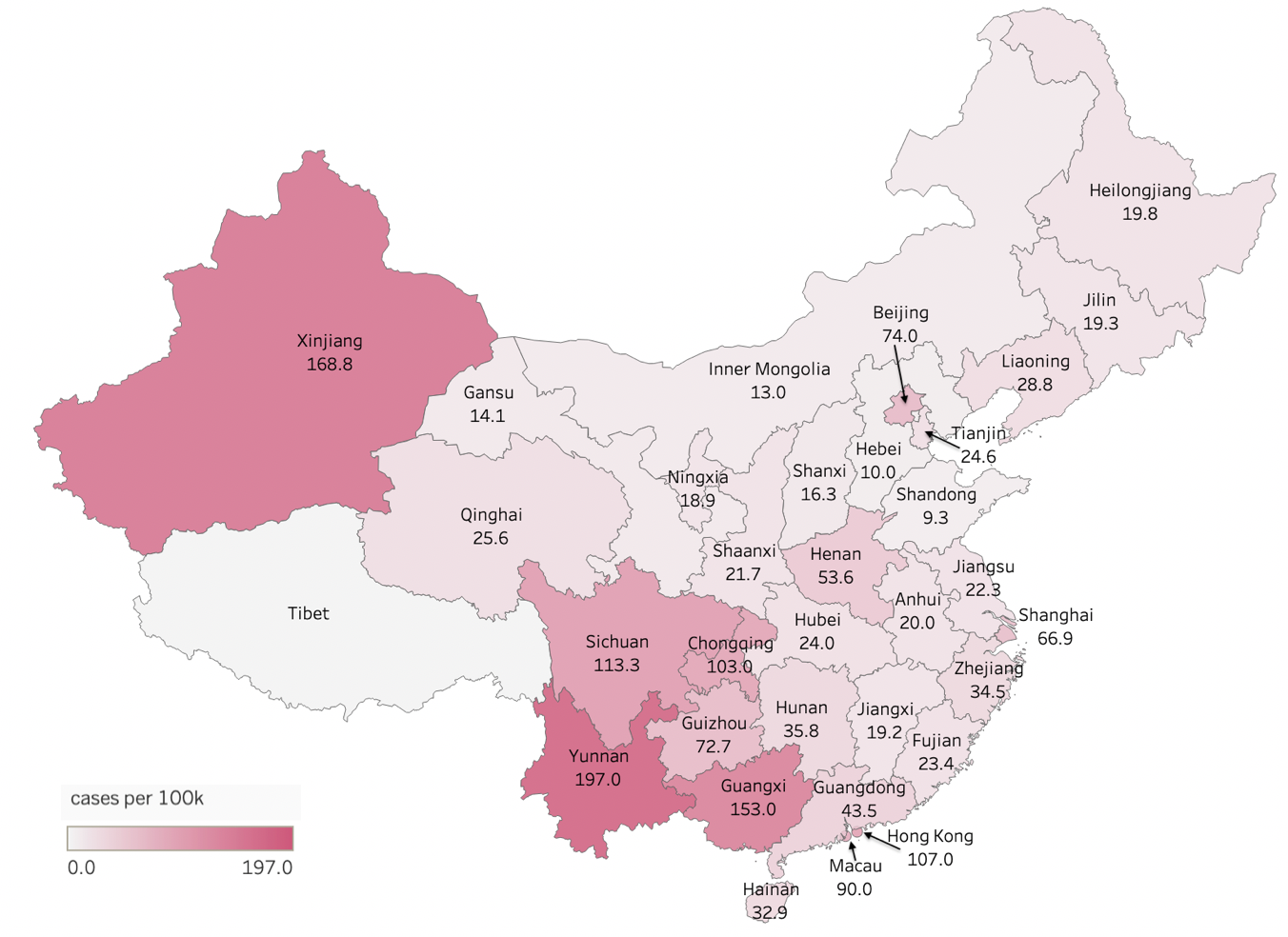
The prevalence of HIV/AIDS in China per 100k people, for the year 2016

HIV in China is primarily transmitted through sexual contact, which accounts for over 90% of new infections. Sexual transmission gradually began to overtake the originally predominant routes of transmission, injection drug use and unsafe blood donation practices, throughout the 1990s and into the mid-2000s. In 2005, sexual transmission accounted for 50% of all new infections, and by 2007, a majority of HIV/AIDS cases overall were related to sexual transmission pathways.

Currently, major high-risk groups for HIV infection include intravenous drug users, men who have sex with men (MSM), and sex workers. The Chinese government has additionally established data collection and monitoring sites targeting male migrant workers, long-distance truck drivers, male STI clinic patients, antenatal care clinic patients, and college students.

MSM in particular have seen a significant increase in transmission rates since epidemiological studies examining them as a group began in 2000. MSM represented 26% of new reported cases in 2014, up from 2.5% in 2006. Increased migration from poorer regions with high HIV prevalence to urban areas and somewhat liberalized attitude towards homosexuality in China over the last two decades, resulting in more overall sexual activity, have been hypothesized as factors driving this trend.

MSM are also generally at a higher risk for contracting STIs, including syphilis, which may form a coinfection with HIV. Drug use contributes little to HIV infection among MSM, with the overwhelming majority of new cases being the result of sexual activity. More than one-fifth of MSM are married to women, which might speed the transmission of HIV to the general population, and outreach to this subgroup in particular can be difficult.

=== Mortality rates ===
The standardized mortality rate of HIV/AIDS rose from 0.33 per 100,000 people in 1990 to 2.50 per 100,000 in 2016, and the rate is higher in men than in women. Overall rates of mortality continue to grow as more individuals are infected. The provision of antiretroviral therapy (ART) among infected individuals, however, has greatly decreased mortality among patients receiving care since the early 2000s; by 2014 86.9% of eligible patients were receiving some form of ART.

== Control and prevention ==
=== Overview of policy response ===
The response of the government of China to the HIV/AIDS crisis evolved in tandem with the epidemic itself. Generally, policy moved from preventive and containment measures aimed at keeping the disease from reaching the general population, often with a reliance on enforcement of public morality, to more active, data-driven control measures involving targeted education and harm reduction programs. Early law and policy implementation were often hindered by lack of knowledge among lawmakers on the severity and impact of HIV/AIDS and its potential for growth within China.

==== 1985–1988: protection from foreign infection ====
The first phase of Chinese HIV/AIDS policy ran from the first recorded in-country death in 1985, of a tourist in Beijing, until 1988/89, when the identified epidemic pattern expanded following the discovery of the outbreak in Yunnan. From 1985 to 1988, only 22 individuals tested positive for HIV in China, 18 of whom were foreigners or Overseas Chinese. HIV/AIDS was commonly viewed as a consequence of a Western lifestyle, and thus government efforts concentrated on protecting China from foreign transmission and promoting moral behavior and traditional values among citizens. "AIDS" was often punned in Chinese as "loving capitalism disease" (simplified Chinese: 爱资病; traditional Chinese: 愛資病; pinyin: Àizībìng), and public health authorities held that because homosexuality and other abnormal sexual behaviors were not prevalent in Chinese society, the disease had limited potential to spread.

In December 1985, the Ministry of Health submitted a report to the Secretariat of the Chinese Communist Party and the State Council, outlining the spread of the disease from Africa to Europe and America, emphasizing the predominantly sexual transmission routes, and listing measures the Ministry had taken to prevent its further spread into China. Laws and regulations attempting to eliminate the risk of foreigners infecting native Chinese were promulgated, under the assumption that this could keep the disease out of the country altogether.

By 1986, foreigners intending to stay over a year were required to undergo HIV testing, and HIV-positive people were legally barred from entering China. The New York Times reported that police in some cities were instructed to prevent foreigners from coming into sexual contact with Chinese people, including in discothèques, dance halls, and brothels. These early policies of containment, which also included wider crackdowns on drug use and prostitution, did little to check the spread of the disease, and possibly hindered initial identification of its domestic reservoirs.

==== 1989–1994: control of limited epidemic ====
The discovery of the outbreak in Yunnan triggered a large increase in the number of reported cases as the disease rapidly spread among high-risk groups. The Yunnan outbreak forced health officials to reconsider aspects of Chinese HIV/AIDS policy, although efforts were still largely focused on policing drug use and prostitution.

Social science research on previously taboo topics, including homosexuality, prostitution and drugs, began to proliferate during this period and served to inform policy that did not rely on a view of HIV/AIDS as an inherently Western problem. The Ministry of Health began exploring methods such as the implementation of behavioral interventions and free STI testing among high risk populations. Officials also experimented with less punitive counter-drug policy, such as the establishment of a limited number of methadone clinics in larger, well-equipped medical institutions in 1993. A wide range of officials—including State Council officials and health, security, justice, and education civil servants—were sent on tours to study policy and disease control strategies in places heavily affected by AIDS, such as the United States, Brazil, Australia, and Thailand.

==== 1995–2003: combatting widespread epidemic ====
In 1995, HIV cases began appearing consistently beyond the borders of Yunnan as the epidemic entered a phase of rapid growth. The government grew more concerned with the public health threat HIV/AIDS posed. Previously uncommon harm reduction strategies began to appear in limited capacities, a departure from previous years.

Several novel state organizations were established at the national level to strengthen the government response to HIV/AIDS. The compartmentalized nature of the Chinese bureaucracy historically made work on HIV/AIDS difficult because different agencies and departments were responsible for different aspects of data collection, service provision, and healthcare. In 1996, the State Council established STD/AIDS Prevention and Control Coordinating Meeting System (国务院防治艾滋病性病协调会议制度) to coordinate policy at the national level, although this body met infrequently. On 1 July 1998, following nearly two years of planning, the National Center for HIV/AIDS Prevention and Control under the Ministry of Health (卫生部艾滋病预防控制中心) was established. This entity became the National Center for AIDS/STD Control and Prevention of the Chinese Center for Disease Control and Prevention (NCAIDS/STD, 中国疾病控制中心性病艾滋病预防控制中心) in January 2002.

A number of substantive policy developments related to HIV/AIDS occurred during this period. In September 1995, the State Council and Ministry of Health release "Recommendations on Strengthening AIDS Prevention and Control" (关于加强和控制艾滋病工作的意见), developing and reviewing laws and regulations related to HIV/AIDS control and improving enforcement mechanisms. HIV/AIDS work was included in the overall national development strategy of China, and the government signaled openness to the support of non-governmental organizations in combatting the epidemic.

Blood donation centers, closed nationwide in 1995 in response to the Plasma Economy scandal, were reopened in 1997–98 with the passage of the Blood Donation Law (中华人民共和国献血法). In 1998, needle exchange programs were implemented in Guangxi, and further expanded in the early 2000s as their efficacy became clear, although some localities and national government departments (such as the Ministry of Public Security) remained opposed to such efforts on the grounds that they encouraged drug use.

In November 1998, the State Council released a document entitled "China's National Medium-and Long-Term Strategic Plan for HIV/AIDS Prevention and Control (1998–2010)" (关于印发中国预防与控制艾滋病中长期规划(1998–2010年)), outlining the Chinese government's goals to be carried out at local, provincial, and national levels, and further monitored through regular assessments. The document included a number of specific objectives and mandates, including:

- Ordering local governments to consider HIV/AIDS prevention and treatment as a part of all policy planning and socioeconomic development goals;
- Disseminating knowledge about the disease and its prevention (including promotion of condom use) to the general population through publicity campaigns, the school systems, and mass media (a 2001 survey found that 20% of the general population had not even heard of the disease);
- Strengthening surveillance and data collection and coordinate standardized testing, training, and screening measures nationally;
- Increasing research both on HIV/AIDS treatments and on epidemiological studies of the disease; and
- Developing and improving HIV/AIDS-related legislation and regulations nationwide.

The State Council further consolidated and expanded work on HIV and AIDS with China's first five-year plan for AIDS/HIV, covering 2001–2005. While still cautious about embracing harm reduction policies for fear of promoting social ills, the plan was a milestone for such policies overall and laid the groundwork for more ambitious efforts in following five-year plans.

==== 2003–present: evidence-based approaches post-SARS ====
The 2002–2004 SARS outbreak, which originated in Foshan, China, led to significant changes to public health policy, including shifts in the state's approach to HIV and AIDS. Funding and political support for HIV/AIDS-related policies began to increase markedly. Wu et al. (2007) argue that "SARS showed not only how infectious diseases could threaten economic and social stability but also the effect of China's policies on international health problems", resulting in increased expertise and attention devoted to HIV/AIDS overall.

The new administration of Hu Jintao and Wen Jiabao, which ascended to power in March 2003, heightened commitment to evidence-based policy to fight HIV/AIDS. Wu Yi was appointed the Minister of Health, and her tenure saw a greater willingness to publicly discuss health crises like HIV/AIDS; Wu even met with activist Gao Yaojie shortly after her appointment.

In September 2003, Vice Minister of Health Gao Qiang outlined five promises of the Chinese government in its fight against AIDS in an address to the United Nations General Assembly's special session on HIV/AIDS. Gao said the Chinese government would commit to free antiretroviral therapy for poor rural and urban citizens, free counseling and treatment services, free treatment for pregnant women and testing for their children, free tuition and fees for children affected by HIV/AIDS, and financial support for any affected families. On World AIDS Day, 1 December 2003, while meeting with an AIDS patient in an effort to decrease stigma surrounding the disease, Premier Wen also formally announced the "Four Frees and One Care" (四免一怀) policy based on the measures outlined by Gao. Funding initially came from a $90 million grant of The Global Fund to Fight AIDS, Tuberculosis and Malaria, focusing on free testing for those in provinces where blood donation had been a major channel of infection.

In March 2006, the State Council implemented the "Regulation on the Prevention and Treatment of HIV/AIDS", codifying principles of prevention, treatment, and behavioral interventions into a national framework. It explicitly endorsed methadone treatment and condom education, among other measures, spurring the establishment of over 600 clinics nationwide by 2010. The law also formally proscribed discrimination of people based on their HIV status, and no longer prevented HIV-positive people from entering the country.

=== International cooperation and funding ===
Prior to 2003, the majority of the capital for anti-HIV/AIDS policies and programs in China came from foreign sources, including NGOs like the Red Cross and Bill and Melinda Gates Foundation, foreign government agencies like the US Centers for Disease Control and Prevention, and international multilateral organizations like the UN and WHO. Dedicated funds for HIV/AIDS were first allocated by the Ministry of Finance in 1998. By 2015, 99% of HIV/AIDS response efforts were funded by domestic sources, and total expenditures reached nearly RMB 7 billion (approx. USD 1 billion) for the fiscal year 2017.

== Discrimination against people with HIV/AIDS ==
Discrimination against HIV-positive individuals is an ongoing issue in China. Various provinces have historically adopted different measures related to people with HIV, most of which restrict their equal access to the public sphere. In some provinces in municipalities in the early 2000s, people with HIV were prohibited from holding certain jobs, HIV mothers could be required to undergo an abortion, and an HIV-positive couple could be legally barred from marriage on medical grounds.

The 2006 Regulation on the Prevention and Treatment of HIV/AIDS formally barred legal discrimination against anyone based on the HIV status. While lauding the Regulation as a major step forward, the United Nations Economic and Social Commission for Asia and the Pacific in 2015 reported that local governments often functionally ignored its provisions. A 2016 study in Guangzhou found that large numbers of healthcare providers also discriminated against HIV-positive patients, with over one-third refusing to treat such patients altogether.

In January 2013, China saw its first lawsuit awarding damages to a plaintiff on the grounds of HIV/AIDS discrimination. The plaintiff had been rejected for a job as a school teacher by the education bureau of Jinxian County, Jiangxi province specifically due to his HIV status.

== Traditional Chinese medicine ==
As of December 2018, the only Traditional Chinese medicine therapy approved by the National Medical Products Administration (NMPA) of China was herbal ''tangcao'' tablets (Chinese: 唐草片; pinyin: Tángcǎo piàn). A number of other traditional supplements are under clinical trial reviews, but have not yet met NMPA standards. TCM research efforts are primarily focused on lessening the side effects of highly active antiretroviral therapy (HAART) and protecting against opportunistic infections.

Extracts of traditional medicines have served as bases for trials of antiviral therapies, including baicalin and Dantonic. A group of nine HIV/AIDS patients in 2017 were reported to have been functionally cured through TCM treatments, but these trials lacked controlled, regular observations. A 2018 study suggested substantive differences in protein expression and signaling in certain TCM-identified syndromes for those with HIV/AIDS. Controlled studies have yet to demonstrate any effect on long-term survival among HIV/AIDS patients, however, its validity is difficult to discern, and research is lacking on the interactions between Western and Traditional Chinese pharmacological products.

== Activism ==
In China, like elsewhere, HIV/AIDS activists have played an important role in promoting public awareness and education about the disease, helping to prevent discrimination against people living with HIV/AIDS and highlighting factors which may impede efforts to check the spread of the disease. Compared to other social movements, the Chinese government has historically been more tolerant of HIV/AIDS-focused NGOs and civil society organizations, relying on them to reach out to marginalized groups most vulnerable to the disease.

The government at all administrative levels has also often sought to suppress or minimize activism perceived as sensitive, obscene, or a threat to stability, including that related to HIV/AIDS. This phenomenon was particularly pronounced in Henan, where the initial blood donation outbreak, in which local authorities were extensively involved, was most severe.

In 2007, activist Gao Yaojie was placed under house arrest in her home in Zhengzhou in order to prevent her from visiting the United States to receive an award from Vital Voices Global Partnership and meet with Hillary Clinton.

== Socioeconomic effect ==
The process of the effect of HIV/AIDS can be described as having three key stages: first, the effect experienced at the micro level; second, at the sectoral level; and finally, at the macro level. The effect began to be observed in China at the micro, or household level, and will most certainly be observed in the future at the sectoral level. Individuals and families have been bearing both the economic and social costs of the disease, and the poverty of those affected have increased and will further increase substantially.

Expenditures for the health sector will increase, for both treatment and prevention interventions. The macro level has been mostly unaffected. But if without effective preventive action, the HIV spread in the general population at large will affect the macro level as have happened in some countries in sub-Saharan Africa.

== Media ==
=== Documentaries ===
Chinese-American director Ruby Yang has made a documentary about AIDS in rural China, which premiered on 14 June 2006, entitled The Blood of Yingzhou District.

An abridged version of Robert Bilheimer's acclaimed US-made 2003 documentary A Closer Walk was shown on China Central Television (CCTV) on World AIDS Day, 1 December (Friday), 2006, and was rerun Sunday and Monday. It was viewed by around 400 million people. The 75-minute-long documentary, narrated by actors Will Smith and Glenn Close, had premiered in the United States in 2003.

== See also ==
- HIV/AIDS in Hong Kong
- Blood donation restrictions on men who have sex with men
- The Blood of Yingzhou District
- Plasma Economy
- HIV/AIDS in Yunnan

Activists:

- Hu Jia (activist)
- Gao Yaojie
- Wangdu (activist)
- Wan Yanhai
- Zeng Jinyan
- Zhang Beichuan

== Notes and references ==
- 2015 China AIDS Response Progress Report (PDF) (Report). National Health and Family Planning Commission of the People's Republic of China. May 2015.
- Beyrer, Chris; Razak, Myat Hoo; Lisam, Khomdom; Chen, Jie; Lui, Wei; Yu, Xiao-fang (2000). "Overland heroin trafficking routes and HIV-1 spread in south and south-east Asia". AIDS. 14 (1): 75–83. doi:10.1097/00002030-200001070-00009. PMID 10714570. S2CID 2214751.
- China: 'At A Critical Stage': Violations of the Right to Health in the Context of the Fight Against AIDS (PDF) (Report). Fédération internationale des ligues des droits de l'homme (International Federation for Human Rights). April 2015.
- Curran, James W.; Jaffe, Harold W. (October 7, 2011). "AIDS: the Early Years and CDC's Response". Morbidity and Mortality Weekly Report. 60 (4). Centers for Disease Control and Prevention: 64–69. PMID 21976168.
- Dong, Meng-Jie; Peng, Bin; Liu, Zhen-Feng; Ye, Qian-ni; Liu, Hao; Lu, Xi-Li; Zhang, Bo; Chen, Jia-Jia (27 November 2019). "The prevalence of HIV among MSM in China: a large-scale systematic analysis". BMC Infectious Diseases. 19 (1): 1000. doi:10.1186/s12879-019-4559-1. PMC 6880607. PMID 31775654.
- Dong, Xiaomei; Yang, Jianwei; Peng, Lin; Pang, Minhui; Zhang, Jiayi; Zhang, Zhan; Rao, Jiaming; Wang, Haiqing; Chen, Xiongfei (15 June 2018). "HIV-related stigma and discrimination amongst healthcare providers in Guangzhou, China". BMC Public Health. 18 (1): 738. doi:10.1186/s12889-018-5654-8. PMC 6003171. PMID 29902990.
- Gao, Disi; Zou, Zhiyong; Dong, Bin; Zhang, Wenjing; Chen, Tianqi; Cui, Wenxin; Ma, Yinghua; Haider, Mohammad Rifat (18 July 2019). "Secular trends in HIV/AIDS mortality in China from 1990 to 2016: Gender disparities". PLOS ONE. 14 (7) e0219689. Bibcode:2019PLoSO..1419689G. doi:10.1371/journal.pone.0219689. PMC 6638923. PMID 31318900.
- Gewirtz, Julian (4 March 2020). "'Loving Capitalism Disease': Aids and Ideology in the People's Republic of China, 1984–2000*". Past & Present (249): 251–294. doi:10.1093/pastj/gtz068.
- Hayes, Anna (2005). "AIDS, Bloodheads & Cover-Ups: The "Abc" of Henan's Aids Epidemic". Australian Quarterly. 77 (3): 12–16, 40. ISSN 1443-3605. JSTOR 20638337.
- He, Na; Detels, Roger (November 2005). "The HIV epidemic in China: history, response, and challenges". Cell Research. 15 (11–12): 825–832. doi:10.1038/sj.cr.7290354. PMID 16354555. S2CID 19688214.
- Hesketh, Therese (February 2007). "HIV/AIDS in China: the numbers problem". The Lancet. 369 (9562): 621–623. doi:10.1016/S0140-6736(07)60290-6. PMID 17321294. S2CID 46179591.
- HIV/AIDS: China's Titanic Peril: 2001 Update of the AIDS Situation and Needs Assessment Report (PDF) (Report). UN Theme Group on HIV/AIDS in China. June 2002.
- Jia, Yujiang; Lu, Fan; Sun, Xinhua; Vermund, Sten H. (November 2007). "Sources of data for improved surveillance of HIV/AIDS in China". The Southeast Asian Journal of Tropical Medicine and Public Health. 38 (6): 1041–52. PMC 2730767. PMID 18613545.
- Kaufman, Joan; Kleinman, Arthur; Saich, Arthur, eds. (2006). AIDS and Social Policy in China. Harvard University Asia Center.
- Kaufman, Joan; Meyers, Kathrine (2006). "AIDS Surveillance in China: Data Gaps and Research for AIDS Policy". In Kaufman, Joan; Kleinman, Arthur; Saich, Arthur (eds.). AIDS and Social Policy in China. Harvard University Asia Center. pp. 47–71.
- Li, Jianhua; Ha, Toan H; Zhang, Cunmin; Liu, Hongjie (2010). "The Chinese government's response to drug use and HIV/AIDS: A review of policies and programs". Harm Reduction Journal. 7 (1): 4. doi:10.1186/1477-7517-7-4. PMC 2847555. PMID 20205729.
- Li, Li; Cao, Xiaobin; Luo, Wei; Wang, Change; Wu, Zunyou; Rou, Keming (2017). "中国2013-2014年艾滋病高危人群干预工作网络直报数据质量分析" [Quality of network direct reporting of information about intervention service in populations at high risk for HIV infection in China, 2013-2014]. Chinese Journal of Epidemiology (in Chinese). 38 (9): 1197–1200. doi:10.3760/cma.j.issn.0254-6450.2017.09.011. PMID 28910931.
- Lin, Wen; Chen, Sanny; Seguy, Nicole; Chen, Zhongdan; Sabin, Keith; Calleja, Jesus Garcia; Bulterys, Marc (31 December 2012). "Is the HIV sentinel surveillance system adequate in China? Findings from an evaluation of the national HIV sentinel surveillance system". Western Pacific Surveillance and Response Journal. 3 (4): 61–68. doi:10.5365/wpsar.2012.3.3.004. PMC 3729100. PMID 23908946.
- Lo, Catherine Yuk-ping (2015). HIV/AIDS in China and India: Governing Health Security. New York: Palgrave MacMillan. ISBN 978-1-137-50419-7.
- Marx, J. L. (13 August 1982). "New disease baffles medical community". Science. 217 (4560): 618–621. Bibcode:1982Sci...217..618M. doi:10.1126/science.7089584. PMID 7089584.
- Pisani, Elizabeth; Wu, Zunyou (2017). "AIDS Policy: China's Tipping Point". In Wu, Zunyou (ed.). HIV/AIDS in China Beyond the Numbers. Springer and People's Medical Publishing House. pp. 37–47. ISBN 978-981-10-3746-7.
- Pisani, Elizabeth; Wu, Zunyou (2017). "HIV in China: 30 Years in Numbers". In Wu, Zunyou (ed.). HIV/AIDS in China Beyond the Numbers. Springer and People's Medical Publishing House. pp. 119–137. ISBN 978-981-10-3746-7.
- Pisani, Elizabeth; Zhang, Nanci (2017). "AIDS Comes to China". In Wu, Zunyou (ed.). HIV/AIDS in China Beyond the Numbers. Springer and People's Medical Publishing House. pp. 1–9. ISBN 978-981-10-3746-7.
- Restrictions on AIDS Activists in China (PDF) (Report). Human Rights Watch. June 2005.
- Sharp, Paul M.; Hahn, Beatrice H. (September 2011). "Origins of HIV and the AIDS pandemic". Cold Spring Harbor Perspectives in Medicine. 1 (1) a006841. doi:10.1101/cshperspect.a006841. PMC 3234451. PMID 22229120.
- Steinbrook, R (2004). "The AIDS Epidemic in 2004". N Engl J Med. 351 (2): 115–17. doi:10.1056/nejmp048156. PMID 15247349.
- Sun, Jiangping; Liu, Hui; Li, Hui; Wang, Liqiu; Guo, Haoyan; Shan, Duo; Bulterys, Marc; Korhonen, Christine; Hao, Yang; Ren, Minghui (26 November 2010). "Contributions of international cooperation projects to the HIV/AIDS response in China". International Journal of Epidemiology. 39 (Supplement 2): ii14–ii20. doi:10.1093/ije/dyq208. PMC 2992613. PMID 21113032.
- Sun, Xinhua; Lu, Fan; Wu, Zunyou; Poundstone, Katharine; Zeng, Gang; Xu, Peng; Zhang, Dapeng; Liu, Kangmai; Liau, Adrian (26 November 2010). "Evolution of information-driven HIV/AIDS policies in China". International Journal of Epidemiology. 39 (Supplement 2): ii4–ii13. doi:10.1093/ije/dyq217. PMC 2992621. PMID 21113036.
- The Next Wave of HIV/AIDS: Nigeria, Ethiopia, Russia, India, and China (Report). National Intelligence Council of the United States. September 2002. Archived from the original on 9 August 2016.
- The Policy and Legal Environments Related to HIV Services in China: Review and Consultation (PDF) (Report). United Nations Economic and Social Commission for Asia and the Pacific (UNESCAP). 2015.
- Wang, Ning; Wang, Lu; Wu, Zunyou; Guo, Wei; Sun, Xinhua; Poundstone, Katharine; Wang, Yu (26 November 2010). "Estimating the number of people living with HIV/AIDS in China: 2003-09". International Journal of Epidemiology. 39 (Supplement 2): ii21–ii28. doi:10.1093/ije/dyq209. PMC 2992614. PMID 21113033.
- Worobey, Michael; Watts, Thomas D.; McKay, Richard A.; Suchard, Marc A.; Granade, Timothy; Teuwen, Dirk E.; Koblin, Beryl A.; Heneine, Walid; Lemey, Philippe; Jaffe, Harold W. (26 October 2016). "1970s and 'Patient 0' HIV-1 genomes illuminate early HIV/AIDS history in North America". Nature. 539 (7627): 98–101. Bibcode:2016Natur.539...98W. doi:10.1038/nature19827. PMC 5257289. PMID 27783600.
- Wu, Min (September 2006). "Framing AIDS in China: A Comparative Analysis of US and Chinese Wire News Coverage of HIV/AIDS in China". Asian Journal of Communication. 16 (3): 251–272. doi:10.1080/01292980600857781. S2CID 143117401.
- Wu, Zunyou; Rou, Keming; Cui, Haixia (June 2004). "The HIV/AIDS Epidemic in China: History, Current Strategies and Future Challenges". AIDS Education and Prevention. 16 (supplement_a): 7–17. doi:10.1521/aeap.16.3.5.7.35521. PMID 15262561.
- Wu, Zunyou; Sullivan, Sheena; Wang, Yu; Rotheram-Borus, Mary Jane; Roger, Detels (March 2007). "The Evolution of China's Response to HIV/AIDS". Lancet. 369 (9562): 679–690. doi:10.1016/S0140-6736(07)60315-8. PMC 7137740. PMID 17321313.
- Wu, Zunyou; Rou, Keming; Detels, Roger (2001). "Prevalence of HIV infection among former commercial plasma donors in rural eastern China". Health Policy and Planning. 16 (1): 825–832. doi:10.1093/heapol/16.1.41. PMID 11238429.
- Xiao, Yan; Kristensen, Sibylle; Sun, Jiangping; Lu, Lin; Vermund, Sten H. (February 2007). "Expansion of HIV/AIDS in China: Lessons from Yunnan Province". Social Science & Medicine. 64 (3): 665–675. doi:10.1016/j.socscimed.2006.09.019. PMC 2730760. PMID 17107739.
- Xu, Peng; Han, Lin; Zeng, Gang; Ma, Fuchang; Liu, Kangmai; Lü, Fan (2013). "我国预防控制经性途径传播艾滋病的政策变迁及趋势分析" [Prevention and Control of Sexually Transmitted HIV/AIDS in China: Policy Evolution and Trends]. Chinese Journal of Health Policy (in Chinese). 6 (7): 64–67.
- Xue, Bin (2005). "HIV/AIDS policy and policy evolution in China". International Journal of STD & AIDS. 16 (7): 459–464. doi:10.1258/0956462054308477. PMID 16004623. S2CID 8203989.
- Yin, Wenyuan; Hao, Yang; Sun, Xinhua; Gong, Xiuli; Li, Fang; Li, Jianhua; Rou, Keming; Sullivan, Sheena G.; Wang, Changhe; Cao, Xiaobin; Luo, Wei; Wu, Zunyou (26 November 2010). "Scaling up the national methadone maintenance treatment program in China: achievements and challenges". International Journal of Epidemiology. 39 (Supplement 2): ii29–ii37. doi:10.1093/ije/dyq210. PMC 2992615. PMID 21113034.
- Yu, Elena S. H.; Xie, Qiyi; Zhang, Konglai; Lu, Ping; Chan, Lillian L. (August 1996). "HIV infection and AIDS in China, 1985 through 1994". American Journal of Public Health. 86 (8): 1116–1122. doi:10.2105/ajph.86.8_pt_1.1116. PMC 1380623. PMID 8712271.
- Zhang, Yong; Lu, Lin; Ba, Lei; Liu, Li; Yang, Li; Jia, Manhong; Wang, Haibo; Fang, Qing; Shi, Yuhua; Yan, Wenyun; Chang, Guangcai; Zhang, Linqi; Ho, David D.; Chen, Zhiwei (November 14, 2006). "Dominance of HIV-1 Subtype CRF01_AE in Sexually Acquired Cases Leads to a New Epidemic in Yunnan Province of China". PLOS Medicine. 3 (11): 2065–2077. doi:10.1371/journal.pmed.0030443. PMC 1635743. PMID 17105339.
- Zheng, Sifan (July 2018). "The growing threat of China's HIV epidemic". The Lancet Public Health. 3 (7): e311. doi:10.1016/S2468-2667(18)30098-7. PMID 29976325. S2CID 49701840.
