= Yunnan Institute of Development =

The Yunnan Institute of Development (YID, 云南发展培训学院), based in Yunnan Province's Yuxi Prefecture, is a Sino-Danish non-governmental organization, non-formal adult education institute established in 2001 in partnership with Yuxi Teacher College. The institution provides an 11-month volunteer training program that trains students as Development Instructors for work in China, India, Africa, and other locations worldwide [1].

Students of the program work with many transnational non-governmental organizations after completion of the training program by providing rural development activities. Through outreach in local rural communities, these Development Instructors serve the needs of each community teaching a variety of programs. Programs have included offering seminars on nutrition, hygiene, health, sanitation safety, and HIV/AIDS prevention. Development Instructors support local schools and teachers with their activities in children's clubs, primary-school and middle-school support, curriculum development, teacher training, and early childhood development. Additional activities also include running microcredit projects and income generating activities in the whole province. Instruction takes place in both English and Mandarin.

== Work ==
It aims to promote social development in China, Africa and India. Activities include educating people about health, hygiene and HIV, building schools and helping poor farmers with bio-gas and microfinance.

Participants are trained in 11-month courses as 'Development Instructors' (DI) interested in learning about and practicing development. Chinese and foreign participants can choose to conduct development work in Yunnan and then in Africa or India. There are no special qualifications needed to join the Development Instructor programme.

From 2008 the Institute is to also implement shorter courses for project managers. At YID, education is based on "learning by doing". The Institute is a place where the participant plans and implements their own education, where the teacher is a facilitator and where the participant is primarily responsible for their own exploratory learning. YID also runs a Rural Community Development Project called Child Aid, where the DI's receive practical training and actually live and work during their five-month practical training period. YID works closely together with local authorities in the rural areas and in the city.

== DRH movement ==
YID is one of 13 schools worldwide which are part of the DRH Movement (DRH translates from Danish words to mean "The Travelling Folk High School"). YID provides training for volunteers who work in the "Humana People to People" programme. The volunteers work as teachers, and help to train farmers and to develop small businesses in Africa and China.

== See also ==
- HIV/AIDS in Yunnan
- Poverty in China
- List of NGOs in China
