= Zeng Jinyan =

Chinese blogger and human rights activist

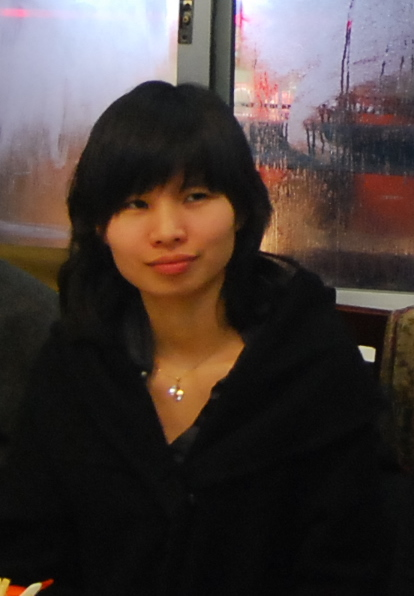
Zeng Jinyan

Zeng Jinyan (Chinese: 曾金燕; born October 9, 1983) is a Chinese blogger and human rights activist. Zeng was put under house arrest in August 2006 and the blog that details her life under constant surveillance and police harassment was subsequently blocked in China. Zeng continued to update her blog until July 27, 2008, before her disappearance.

Zeng Jinyan and Hu Jia made a 31-minute documentary, Prisoners of Freedom City, of their seven-month house arrest from August 2006 to March 2007. The couple was placed under house arrest again two months later on May 18, 2007, for harming state security. Zeng Jinyan is dubbed "Tiananmen 2.0" and was selected as Time magazine's 100 People Who Shape Our World in 2007 as a hero and a pioneer.

One day before the opening ceremony of the 2008 Summer Olympics in Beijing, Zeng was forcibly disappeared along with her baby daughter. She used to live in Hong Kong. In 2017 she earned a Ph.D. degree from the University of Hong Kong with a dissertation on filmmaker Ai Xiaoming. Zeng was the 2017 Oak Human Rights Fellow at Colby College.
