= Wan Yanhai =

Chinese-American AIDS activist (born 1963)

Wan Yanhai (万延海)
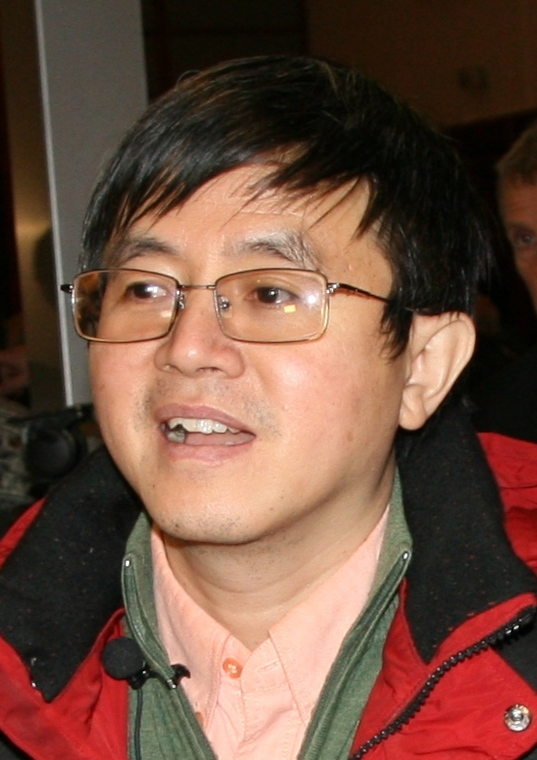
- Born: November 20, 1963 (age 62)
- Citizenship: American
- Known for: AIDS Activism in China and internationally
- Scientific career
- Fields: Public health, Medicine

Wan Yanhai (Chinese: 万延海; pinyin: Wàn Yánhǎi; born 20 November 1963) is a Chinese-American AIDS activist. His "frank and aggressive" approach toward AIDS has led to frequent run-ins with authorities, including a month-long detention in 2002 that made international headlines and sparked a successful international campaign for his release.

Wan has won numerous human rights awards and is a former Fulbright Fellow and 2003 Yale University Global Fellow. Wan is currently the director of the country's foremost AIDS-awareness group, the Beijing-based Aizhixing Institute of Health Education.

Wan has lived in the United States since 2010, and became an American citizen in 2018.

== HIV/AIDS activism ==
Wan started his career at China's Ministry of Health (MOH), working there in 1989 as a researcher. There, he translated the first announcement of the AIDS epidemic into Chinese. In 1992, he set up the first HIV/AIDS telephone hotline in China where people could obtain comprehensive information on HIV/AIDS. In 1994, he founded the AIZHI (AIDS) Action Project (later renamed the Aizhixing Institute). He was fired from his MOH job after founding AIZHI.

After this, he focused much of his AIDS work on advocating for health care and human rights of people with AIDS living in Henan Province, where there was a coverup of blood selling businesses connected to local officials infected tens of thousands (as many as a million) men, women, and children with the AIDS virus. He expanded his work to advocate for the health of injection drug users, sex workers, and other marginalized groups disproportionately affected by the AIDS epidemic.

Wan moved to Los Angeles after becoming a Fulbright New Century Scholar. He returned to China in June 2002, and attempted to set up an independent medical clinic. In July 2002, Chinese authorities banned the AIZHI Action Project and shut down Wan's office. This occurred four days after the United Nations criticized China's inaction on HIV/AIDS.

In August 2002, Wan forwarded a secret government report documenting 170 AIDS-related deaths in Henan province to an email list. He was reported missing on 24 August. Detained by authorities and charged with the leaking of an internal government report, he was released a month later on 20 September following outcry from foreign groups like ACT UP, who protested outside the Chinese consulate in New York City, and Amnesty International. Upon his release told the BBC he learned a "good lesson". Wan's wife said she believed his detention was not due to Wan's breaking of a law, but because the government wanted to cover up the Bloodhead scandal.

That same month, he received the inaugural international human rights award from the Canadian HIV/AIDS Legal Network and Human Rights Watch. His wife, Su Zhaosheng, accepted the award in Montreal in his stead.

He was detained on November 24, 2006, prompted by his efforts to organize a public forum on HIV/AIDS to coincide with World AIDS Day. After his release on November 27, 2006, Wan accused Chinese leaders of falling "asleep" as the virus spreads. He was forced by the government to cancel his "Blood Safety, AIDS and Legal Human Rights Workshop," due to have taken place between 25 and 30 November 2006.

== Other activism ==
Wan participated in the democracy movement beginning in 1986, and witnessed the events of June 4, 1989 at Tiananmen Square.

In the early 1990s, Wan founded a group for gay men focused on promoting health and hosted a Beijing-based radio talk show on gay rights. In 1993, he was accused of promoting homosexuality and prostitution for his activism efforts.

He was co-founder of the Beijing LGBT Center. From 6 to 9 November 2006, he attended an international meeting in Indonesia for The Yogyakarta Principles as one of 29 experts. He participated the 2009 World Outgames for LGBT rights.

He was a signatory of Liu Xiaobo's Charter 08 in December 2008.

== Life in the United States ==
In March 2010, tax authorities opened an investigation into the Aizhixing Institute of Health Education. On 30 March, Wan was lecturing at a university in Guangzhou when his talk was interrupted by police. The following day, police came to his hotel and told him he was forbidden to "bring Aizhixing activities to Guangzhou" and that he needed to report his university lectures to the police; police also sent notice to universities in the cities, forbidding them to allow Wan to lecture on their premises. In the following weeks, authorities continued to visit Wan's apartment and call his cellphone.

Wan Yanhai and his wife decided to flee China, citing government persecution, although where they would go was uncertain, as although Wan had a Schengen visa, his wife and daughter did not. Initially the couple planned to travel to Europe and then approach a U.S. embassy, but visa issues and weather patterns prevented the plan from moving forward.

On 25 April, the three flew to Guangzhou. On 30 April, the family arrived in Hong Kong. They visited the U.S. consular office on 30 April, where they requested a visa for their daughter. The passport was provided on 6 May, when they left for the United States. After arriving, they initially stayed in Philadelphia at a friend's home. Wan was later told by Chinese authorities he would not be able to return to China.

In 2011, tax authorities admitted that they had made an error and returned some 8,000 RMB to Aizhixing Institute.

In 2015, Wan, his wife, and their two daughters moved to Rego Park, Queens, New York City. As of 2020, Wan continued to lived in Queens.

In 2018, Wan was naturalized as a U.S. citizen. He considers himself to be a Democrat, and was a harsh critic of former President Donald Trump.

== Publications ==
- Wan, Yanhai (2001-05-21). "Becoming a Gay Activist in Contemporary China". Journal of Homosexuality. 40 (3–4): 47–64. doi:10.1300/J082v40n03_02. ISSN 0091-8369. PMID 11386338.
- Wan, Yanhai (2016-06-13), AIDS, Human Rights, and Public Security in China (SSRN Scholarly Paper), Rochester, NY, doi:10.2139/ssrn.2795188, hdl:2429/62536, SSRN 2795188
