= Mou girls =

Set of actresses in films by Zhang Yimou

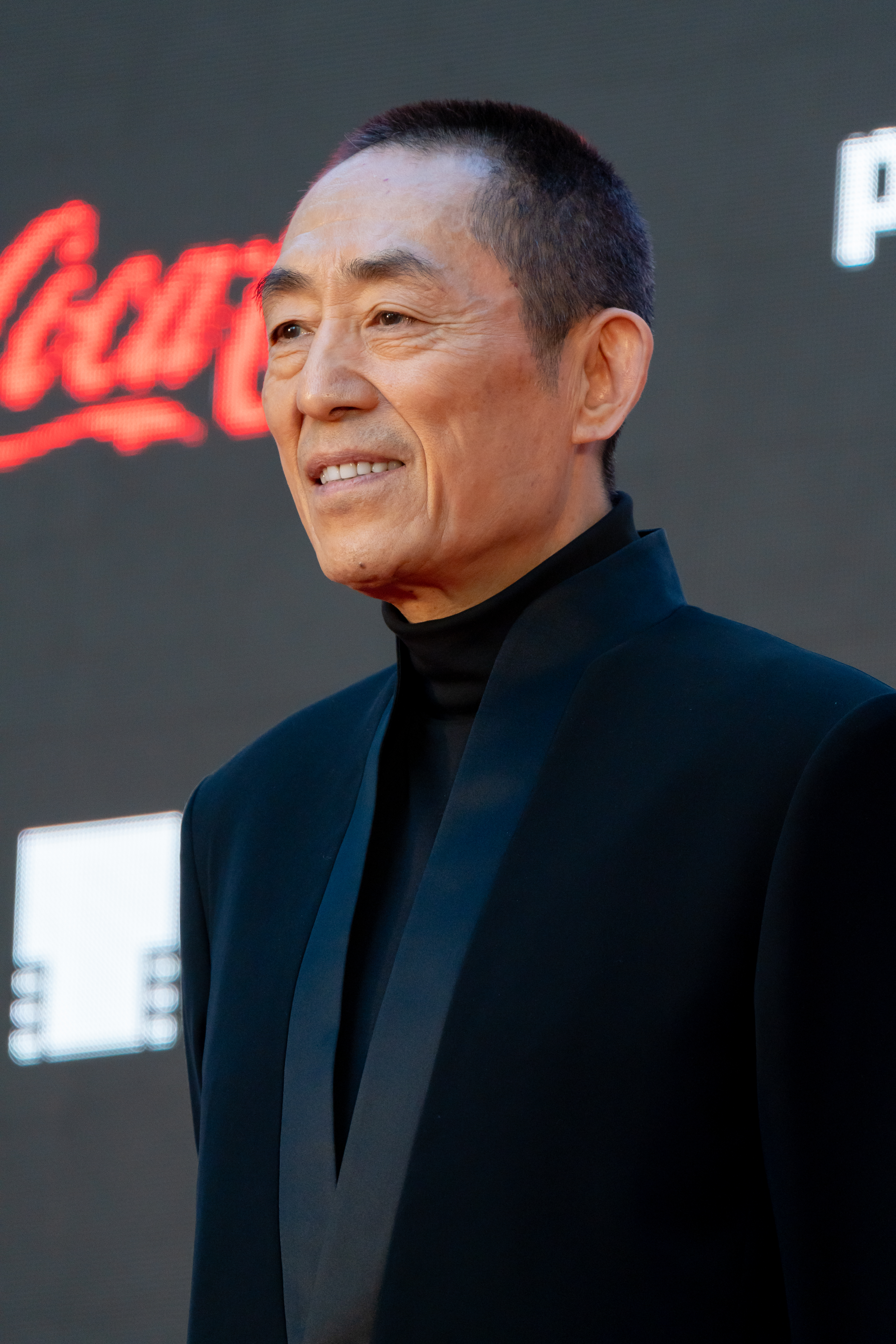
Actresses who received media attention through starring in the movie which directed by Zhang Yimou are often known as "Yimou girls".

"Mou girls" (Chinese: 谋女郎; pinyin: Móu nǚláng) is a nickname given to actresses who made their acting debuts and received media attention by starring in a movie directed by Zhang Yimou.

In the early movies by Zhang Yimou, the actresses Gong Li and Zhang Ziyi attracted attention with their acting debut in Zhang's films. Later, they gained media attention and became international movie stars. The fame of these two stars led to the title of "Yimou girls" given by both the media and the public. Continuing the legacy with Dong Jie and Li Man, the popularity of the nickname rose, although they did not reach the same level of popularity as the other two actresses. In addition, Tang Yan, Wang Jia, Lin Miaoke and others were also called the "Yimou girls" by some media for promotional reasons as they participated in the opening and closing ceremonies of the Olympic Games which were directed by Zhang.

Another common feature of the girls was that they were unknown before they appeared in Zhang's film. Gong Li, Zhang Ziyi and Li Man were students of the Central Academy of Drama. Dong Jie and Zhang Huiwen were dance actresses, Qu Ying was a model, Zhou Dongyu was a high school student, Ni Ni was a college student majoring in broadcasting and Wei Minzhi was of an ordinary rural background.

Cheung Man-yuk was already famous for her frequent collaboration with director Wong Kar-wai before she starred in Zhang's 2002 film Hero. Sun Li was known as a famous Television actress before she appeared in Shadow (2018) and Guan Xiaotong was already a famous child actress. Qin Hailu was famous for her longest TV and movie career.

== List ==
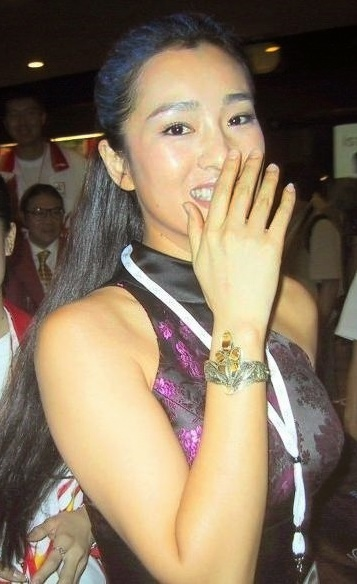
Gong Li has starred in many films with Zhang.

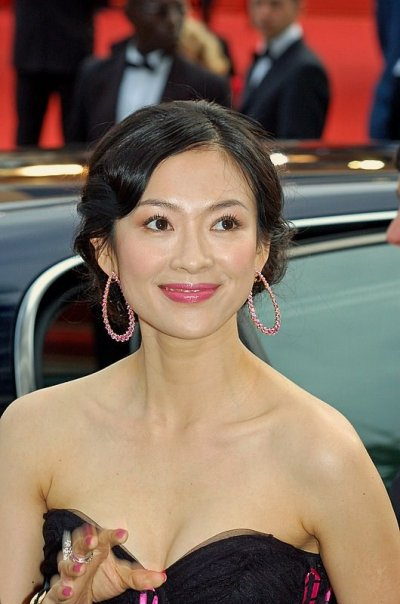
Zhang Ziyi was offered her first major role by director Zhang Yimou in his film The Road Home (1999), and now she is considered to be one of the Big Four Dan Actresses.

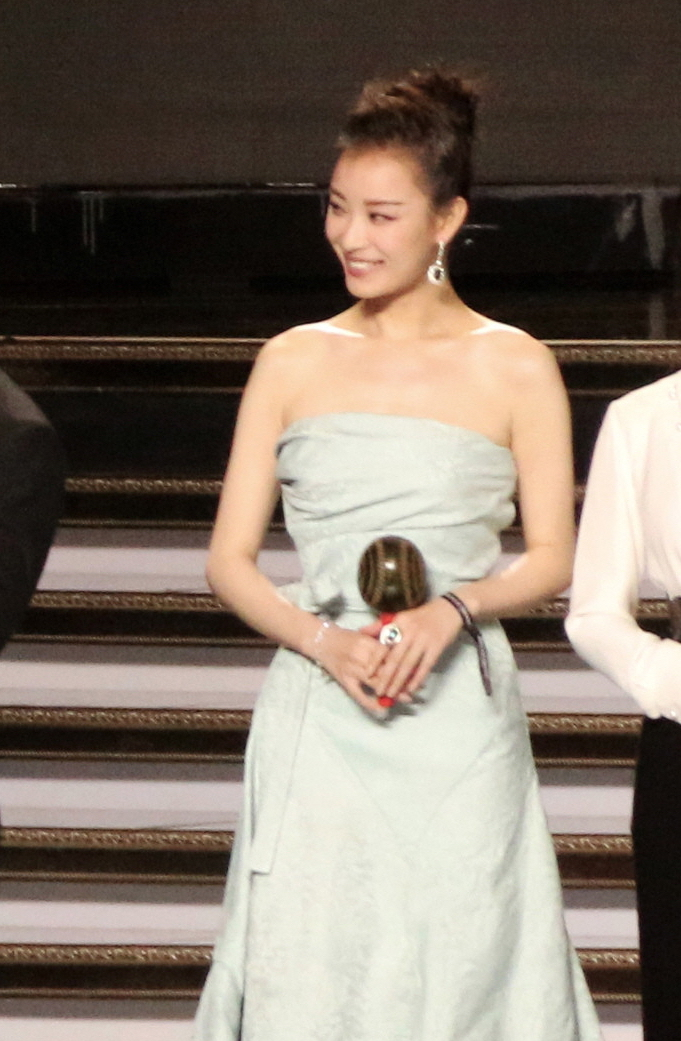
Ni Ni made her acting debut in the Zhang Yimou's war film The Flowers of War (2011) and she is considered to be one of the New Four Dan Actresses of the "post-'85s" generation.

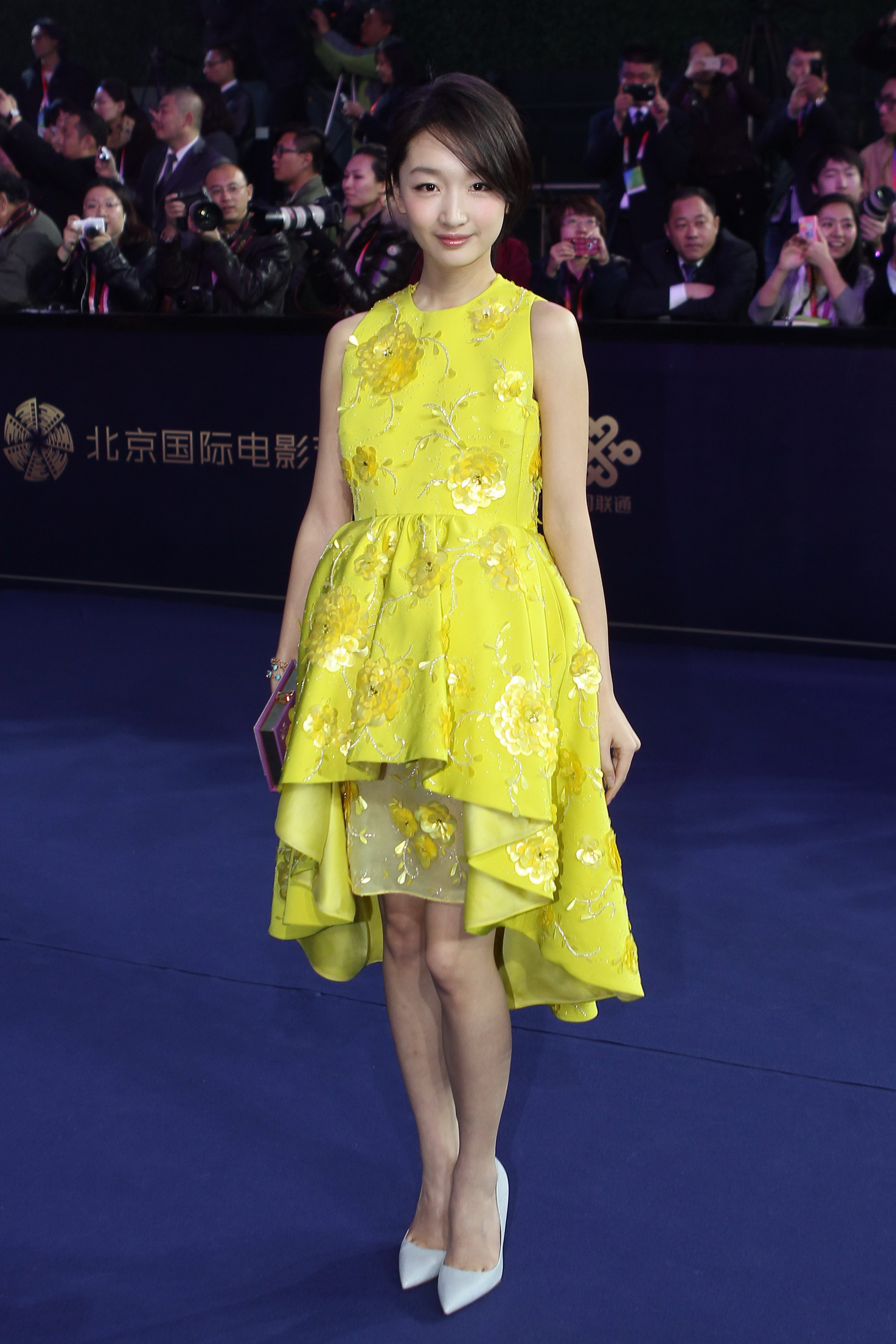
Zhou Dongyu has appeared in Under the Hawthorn Tree, and now she is one of New Four Dan Actresses of the "post-'90s" generation

Yimou girls
Name	First appeared with Yimou in	Other films with Yimou
Gong Li	Red Sorghum (1987)	Codename Cougar (1988), Fight and Love with a Terracotta Warrior (1989) (starring with him), Ju Dou (1990), Raise the Red Lantern(1991), The Story of Qiu Ju(1992), To Live(1994), Shanghai Triad (1995), Curse of the Golden Flower (2006), Coming Home (2014)
Zhang Ziyi	The Road Home (1999)	Hero (2002), House of Flying Daggers (2004)
Dong Jie	Happy Times (2000)	
Wei Minzhi	Not One Less (1999)	
Li Man	Curse of the Golden Flower (2006)	
Zhou Dongyu	Under the Hawthorn Tree (2010)	Under the Light (2023)
Ni Ni	The Flowers of War (2011)	
Zhang Huiwen	Coming Home (2014)	
Liu Haocun	One Second (2020)	Cliff Walkers (2021)

== See also ==
- Bond girl
- Sing girls
- Cinema of Hong Kong
- Cinema of China
