= List of Chinese films of 1997 =

A list of mainland Chinese films released in 1997:

| Title | Director | Cast | Genre | Notes |
|---|---|---|---|---|
| Chinese Box | Wayne Wang | Gong Li, Jeremy Irons, Maggie Cheung, Rubén Blades | Drama | |
| Colors of the Blind | Chen Guoxing | Tao Hong | Drama | |
| Concerto of Life | Xia Gang | | Drama | |
| Dragon Town Story | Yang Fengliang | Wu Chien-lien | Revenge drama | |
| Dream Factory | Feng Xiaogang | Ge You, Feng Xiaogang | Comedy | |
| Eighteen Springs | Ann Hui | Jacklyn Wu, Leon Lai, Anita Mui, Ge You | Drama | Hong Kong/Mainland co-production |
| Fitness Tour | Liu Guoquan | | Comedy | |
| Frozen | Wang Xiaoshuai | Jia Hongsheng | Drama | Wang made this film under the name "Wu Ming" or "no name" |
| Keep Cool | Zhang Yimou | Jiang Wen, Li Baotian | Black comedy | |
| Live in Peace | Hu Bingliu | Pan Yu | Drama | 1998 Golden Rooster for Best Picture |
| Maiden Work | Wang Guangli | Ye You, Lou Ming | Drama | |
| The Making of Steel | Lu Xuechang | Tian Zhuangzhuang, Li Liping | Drama | |
| The Opium War | Xie Jin | | War/Historical | 1997 Golden Rooster for Best Picture |
| Out of Phoenix Bridge | Li Hong | | Documentary | |
| Red River Valley | Feng Xiaoning | Ning Jing | Historical | |
| Spicy Love Soup | Zhang Yang | Gao Yuanyuan | Romantic drama | Zhang Yang's directorial debut |
| Surveillance | Huang Jianxin | | | Entered into the 47th Berlin International Film Festival |
| Warriors of Virtue | Ronny Yu | Angus Macfadyen, Mario Yedidia, Chao-Li Chi | | Co-produced with U.S.A. |
| Xiao Wu | Jia Zhangke | Wang Hongwei | Drama | Jia Zhangke's directorial debut |

== See also ==
- 1997 in China
