= Breaking the Silence (film) =

- Film poster
- Directed by: Sun Zhou
- Written by: Liu Heng; Shao Xiaoli; Sun Zhou
- Produced by: Huang Yong; Zhao Xindian
- Starring: Gong Li
- Cinematography: Lü Yue
- Edited by: Zhai Ru; Nancy Muqing
- Music by: Zhao Jiping
- Production company: Zhujiang Film Group
- Distributed by: Pyramide Films; Helkon Filmverleih GmbH
- Release date: February 13, 2000 (Berlin)
- Running time: 90 minutes
- Country: China
- Language: Mandarin

Breaking the Silence (simplified Chinese: 漂亮妈妈; traditional Chinese: 漂亮媽媽; pinyin: Piàoliang māma; lit. 'pretty mother') is a 2000 Chinese film directed by Sun Zhou. It was China's submission to the 73rd Academy Awards for the Academy Award for Best Foreign Language Film, but was not accepted as a nominee.

Breaking the Silence stars the internationally known Gong Li as a single mother who struggles to raise her deaf child. The film premiered internationally at the 2000 Berlin International Film Festival.

The film was one of three films voted Best Picture in the 2001 Hundred Flowers Awards.

== See also ==
- List of submissions to the 73rd Academy Awards for Best Foreign Language Film
- List of Chinese submissions for the Academy Award for Best Foreign Language Film
