= Keep Cool (film) =

- Film poster for the Japanese release of Keep Cool
- Directed by: Zhang Yimou
- Written by: Shu Ping
- Based on: Evening Papers News by Shu Ping
- Produced by: Wang Qipeng; Wang Wei; Zhang Weiping
- Starring: Jiang Wen; Li Baotian; Qu Ying; Ge You
- Cinematography: Lü Yue
- Edited by: Du Yuan
- Music by: Zang Tianshuo
- Distributed by: Golem Distribución (Spain)
- Release date: September 2, 1997 (Venice)
- Running time: 93 min.
- Country: China
- Language: Mandarin

Keep Cool (simplified Chinese: 有话好好说; traditional Chinese: 有話好好說; pinyin: Yǒu Huà Hǎo Hǎo Shuō; lit. 'If you have something to say', 'say it nicely') is a 1997 Chinese black comedy film directed by Zhang Yimou and adapted from the novel Evening Papers News by Shu Ping. The film, which is about a bookseller in love in 1990s Beijing, marked a move away from Zhang's earlier period pictures to a more realistic cinéma vérité-like era in his career that also saw him make Happy Times (2000) and Not One Less (1999). Keep Cool also marked only the third time Zhang placed his film in the modern era and the first time Zhang did not work with actress Gong Li.

The film was produced by the Guangxi Film Studio.

== Plot ==
The film is set in modern-day Beijing. It begins with bookseller Zhao Xiaoshuai who is following his ex-lover An Hong home, obviously after an unhappy and one-sided break-up. He tracks the fast-walking An Hong on a bus and later on a bicycle, until she reaches her flat and goes up to her apartment. There, Zhao gets a junk peddler and another peddler to call out her name and declare his undying love to her at the high-rise flats.

The next day, the temperamental An Hong becomes impressed enough by Xiaoshuai's efforts to take him up her apartment for a quickie, but their tryst is interrupted by another man downstairs, reciting some nonsensical poetry through a megaphone. Apparently, the person is hired by the peddler Xiaoshuai hired the day before (who has absconded from the job). Xiaoshuai tries unsuccessfully to get the man to stop, and in a huff the angered An Hong leaves her apartment. Xiaoshuai is baffled by his ex blowing hot and cold at him.

The scene shifts to some time later. While waiting at a public bicycle stand Xiaoshuai gets beaten up by nightclub owner Liu Delong and his hired thugs, who warn him never to attach himself to An Hong again (apparently Liu is An Hong's new flame). The concussed Xiaoshuai is sent to a hospital by well-mannered middle-aged stranger Mr. Zhang, who claims Xiaoshuai has accidentally wrecked his brand-new laptop in the act of him being beaten up. The angry Xiaoshuai refuses to compensate, insisting Zhang finds Liu Delong - the main culprit - for payment.

The bothersome Zhang keeps finding Xiaoshuai over the laptop compensation and Xiaoshuai finally relents: the two decide to get down to Liu's nightclub to get Zhang's compensation. Once there, however, Xiaoshuai is unable to contain himself and launches a reckless physical attack on Liu, which lands him at the police station for seven days. Xiaoshuai is released after a reprimand by the police chief. Some time later, Zhang interrupts Xiaoshuai (again) during his tryst with An Hong to inform that Liu has agreed, somewhat belatedly, to pay up and apologize.

The next scene shows Zhang and Xiaoshuai waiting at a karaoke restaurant for Liu to make his indemnity and to end their entanglements with one another. Zhang is happy the two can talk, but Xiaoshuai reveals, after some drinks, that he has come, not really to make up, but with an intent – to sever Liu's right hand. Xiaoshuai then compensates Zhang with a new laptop and tells him to leave and not get implicated with his "crime", but Zhang, realizing the import of the matter, leaves and immediately starts looking for a mobile phone to call up the unsuspecting Liu to stop this "tragedy". Zhang grabs a nearby passer-by's mobile phone, but fails to contact Liu. Xiaoshuai, realizing Zhang is about to wreck his revenge mission, convinces passers-by Zhang is a mad relative and drags him back to the restaurant.

Once back to the restaurant, Zhang realizes he must act quickly to grab the restaurant customers' attention. He overturns a table; in the mayhem, to his chagrin, everyone in the restaurant is convinced by Xiaoshuai that Liu is simply stark mad. The restaurant owner gets Zhang tied up and gagged upstairs, after which he leaves, and an irate chef attacks Zhang for molesting (unwittingly) a fellow waitress whom he fancies. Downstairs, Xiaoshuai waits for Liu. Liu turns up and pays up very amicably, but before Xiaoshuai can launch his attack, the wall-mounted loudspeaker above their table collapses and injures Liu badly. The frantic restaurant owner and customers bring Liu to the nearest hospital, and Xiaoshuai finds himself quite bemused that his revenge plans has turned to nought (although Liu has seemingly had his retribution).

When Xiaoshuai returns upstairs to release the gagged Zhang, he finds a curious scene. Zhang has gone completely berserk and is wreaking havoc by going after the chef with a cleaver. Xiaoshuai tries desperately to calm Zhang, but only manages to see Zhang wreck the new laptop. Like Xiaoshuai, Zhang is detained at the police station for seven days. He is given a light reprimand by the station-master, who advises him to "speak nicely when everyone has something to work out". In an ending requested by the state censors (see below), Xiaoshuai gets someone to pick Zhang up in a van after Zhang's seven-day detainment period is up. Xiaoshuai apologizes in a well-phrased letter for the troubles he caused, promises to curb his violent temper, and pays Zhang a new laptop.

== Style ==
Keep Cool is largely different in style from the rest of Zhang's oeuvre. It is Zhang's first urban comedy, and uses a hip, rock soundtrack and a roving handheld camera with multiple jump cuts to give a feel of contemporary Beijing. The perpetually awry camera angle expresses the chaos of the city, as well as the possibility that anything can happen.

== Music ==
The soundtrack in the movie was performed by Zang Tianshuo, Jiang Wen and Guan Xuezeng.

== Censorship ==
Keep Cool, originally scheduled for a world premiere at the 1997 Cannes Film Festival, was pulled by Chinese censors at the last minute, ostensibly part of a general retrenchment of Chinese control over its film industry following the release of Zhang Yuan's gay-themed East Palace, West Palace.

Chinese censors additionally asked for Zhang to implement substantive changes to the film's story, most notably adding a happy ending.

== Cast ==
- Jiang Wen as Zhao Xiaoshuai (赵小帅); Jiang Wen, one of China's most famous actors and directors, takes a leading role in Keep Cool (his second time working with Zhang Yimou). Zhang referred to the actor as "the best actor in China today, and intelligent. I saw the movie he made [In the Heat of the Sun] and took a video back to my hometown for my parents. We all laughed."
- Li Baotian as Zhang Qiusheng (张秋生) or Lao Zhang; Li Baotian, one of Zhang's regular actors (Ju Dou, Shanghai Triad), again provides a pivotal performance for Keep Cool.
- Qu Ying as An Hong (安红); Zhang Yimou selected the model Qu Ying for the only female role in the film.
- Ge You as The Policeman; Ge You, a comedic actor, has a cameo in the film.
- Zhao Benshan as Junk Peddlar No. 3
- Liu Xinyi (刘信义) as Liu Delong (刘德龙)
