= The Story of Qiu Ju =

1992 Chinese comedy-drama film

- French theatrical release poster

Chinese name
- Chinese: 秋菊打官司
- Literal meaning: Qiu Ju goes to court
Transcriptions
Standard Mandarin
- Hanyu Pinyin: Qiū Jú dǎ guānsi
- Directed by: Zhang Yimou
- Written by: Liu Heng; Novella: Chen Yuanbin
- Produced by: Feng Yiting; Fung Kwok Ma
- Starring: Gong Li; Lei Kesheng; Liu Peiqi; Ge Zhi Jun; Ye Jun; Yang Liu Chun
- Cinematography: Chi Xiaoning; Lu Hongyi; Yu Xiaoquin
- Edited by: Du Yuan
- Music by: Zhao Jiping
- Distributed by: Sony Pictures Classics
- Release date: September 1992 (Venice)
- Running time: 110 minutes
- Country: China
- Language: Mandarin

The Story of Qiu Ju (Chinese: 秋菊打官司; pinyin: Qiū jú dǎ guānsī, "Qiu Ju goes to court") is a 1992 Chinese comedy-drama film. The film was directed by Zhang Yimou and, as in many of his films, stars Gong Li in the title role. The screenplay is an adaption of Chen Yuanbin's (陈源斌) novella The Wan Family's Lawsuit (万家诉讼).

The film tells the story of a peasant woman, Qiu Ju, who lives in a rural area of China. When her husband is kicked in the groin by the village head, Qiu Ju, despite her pregnancy, travels to a nearby town, and later a big city to deal with its bureaucrats and find justice.

The film was selected as the Chinese entry for the Best Foreign Language Film at the 65th Academy Awards, but was not accepted as a nominee. The film was a hit at film festivals and won the Golden Lion award at the Venice Film Festival in 1992.

== Plot ==
Qiu Ju is a peasant who lives in a small farming enclave with her husband Qinglai. She is in the final trimester of her pregnancy. One day while her husband is conversing with Wang Shantang, the head of the community, a miscommunication ensues. The leader feels insulted and beats Qinglai, kicking him so severely in the groin that he must see a doctor and be absent from work.

Qiu Ju goes to the local police office and complains. The policeman makes the village chief pay 200 yuan to Qinglai. When Qiu Ju goes to the headman, he insultingly throws the 200 yuan notes onto the ground and refuses to apologize. Qiu Ju then goes to the provincial capital accompanied by her husbands' younger sister, Meizi. By luck the two women find lodging at a cheap hotel. The two women meet the district police chief and he promises them that their case will be reviewed.

The new verdict from the district police is that this time the village headman must pay 250 yuan. He still refuses to apologize and so Qiu Ju goes back to the big city and finds a lawyer who takes the case and files suit under a new law.

The case is judged by the court as having been correctly resolved by the district, and so the fine remains at 250 yuan. Qiu Ju is unhappy but all she can do is make yet another appeal to an even higher level of police investigation. As part of the suit, officials come to the village and Qiu Ju's husband is X-rayed at the local hospital.

It's now the middle of winter, and Qiu Ju goes into labor. When sought for help, the headman, together with a group of local men, carries Qiu Ju to the hospital, where she gives birth safely to a healthy baby boy.

A month later the whole village is invited to the "one-month party" for the baby. Qiu Ju and her husband invite the village chief too for his help in saving Qiu Ju's life. However, he doesn't come, and the new parents are worried that he has not accepted their attempt at burying the hatchet. This is proven to not be the case, as the local policeman shows up to tell Qiu Ju that the X-rays has revealed that her husband suffered a broken rib. As a result, the village chief has been arrested, and been sent to jail on a fifteen-day-term.

Qiu Ju tries to stop the police from taking the headman away but never even sees them, and the movie ends with Qiu Ju looking anguished.

== Production ==
The film was set in present-day China (1992) in northwest Shaanxi province (an area which the director would return to in his film The Road Home). Many of the street scenes in the cities were filmed with a hidden camera so the images are a sort of documentary of China during the time of Deng Xiaoping. As film critic Roger Ebert said "along the way we absorb more information about the lives of ordinary people in everyday China than in any other film I've seen."

== Home media ==
The Story of Qiu Ju has been released several times on DVD. In the United States, the first release on Region 1 DVD was by Columbia TriStar Home Video on July 20, 2000.

More recently, the film was re-released by Sony Pictures Classics as part of their Zhang Yimou collection (which also included new versions of Ju Dou and Raise the Red Lantern) on March 28, 2006. Both versions include subtitles in English.

An older, VHS cassette version of the film was also released in the United States by Columbia TriStar Home Video on January 17, 1995.

== Reception ==
=== Critical response ===
The Story of Qui Ju has an approval rating of 87% on review aggregator website Rotten Tomatoes, based on 23 reviews, and an average rating of 8.1/10.

=== Awards and nominations ===
- Venice Film Festival, 1992
  - Golden Lion
  - OCIC Award - Honorable Mention
  - Volpi Cup — Best Actress, Gong Li
- Vancouver International Film Festival, 1992
  - Most Popular Film
- Changchun Film Festival, 1992
  - Golden Deer
- Golden Rooster Awards, 1993
  - Best Actress — Gong Li
  - Best Film
- Hundred Flowers Awards, 1993
  - Best Film
- French Syndicate of Cinema Critics, 1993
  - Critics Award — Best Foreign Film, Zhang Yimou
- Independent Spirit Awards, 1994
  - Best Foreign Film — Zhang Yimou
- National Society of Film Critics Awards, 1994
  - Best Foreign Language Film
- Time Out 100 best Chinese Mainland movies – #44
- Included in The New York Times's list of The Best 1000 Movies Ever Made in 2004

== See also ==
- List of submissions to the 65th Academy Awards for Best Foreign Language Film
- List of Chinese submissions for the Academy Award for Best Foreign Language Film
