= Li Xiao =

Li Xiao is the name of:

- Li Xiao (writer) (born 1950), Chinese author
- Li Xiao (footballer) (born 1967), Chinese association footballer and coach
