= List of Chinese submissions for the Academy Award for Best International Feature Film =

Best International Feature Film submissions from China

Highlights
- Debut: 1979
- Submissions: 40
- Nominations: 2
- Oscar winners: none

The People's Republic of China has submitted films for the Academy Award for Best International Feature Film (Note: The category was previously named the Academy Award for Best Foreign Language Film, but this was changed to the Academy Award for Best International Feature Film in April 2019, after the Academy deemed the word "Foreign" to be outdated.) since 1979. The award is handed out annually by the United States Academy of Motion Picture Arts and Sciences to a feature-length motion picture produced outside the United States that contains primarily non-English dialogue.

China, Hong Kong and Taiwan are recognized as separate entities by AMPAS and each one routinely sends a film to the competition. Although China, Hong Kong and Taiwan used to have very separate film industries, a more Pan-Chinese film industry began to develop in the early 2000s, with filmmakers, actors and crew members routinely working on projects outside their home territory. In recent years, Hong Kong in particular has begun to submit Mandarin-language Mainland co-productions like The Banquet (2006) and Painted Skin (2008).

As of 2026, China has been nominated twice, for Ju Dou (1990) and Hero (2002).

== Submissions ==
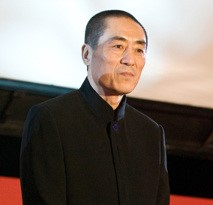
Zhang Yimou directed China's first film nominated for the award, Ju Dou.

Every year, each country is invited by the Academy of Motion Picture Arts and Sciences to submit its best film for the Academy Award for Best International Feature Film since 1956. The International Feature Film Committee oversees the process and reviews all the submitted films. Following this, they vote via secret ballot to determine the five nominees for the award.

With eight films submitted, Zhang Yimou is the filmmaker with most entries. He was nominated twice, for Ju Dou (1990) and Hero (2002), alongside a nomination representing Hong Kong.

Most of the films are primary in Mandarin, with the exception of The Sinking of the Lisbon Maru (2024) which was disqualified for being mostly in English. Below is a list of the films that have been submitted by the People's Republic of China for review by the academy for the award.

Year (Ceremony)	Film title used in nomination	Original title	Language(s)	Director(s)	Result
1979 (52nd)	Effendi	阿凡提	Mandarin	Lang Xiao	Not nominated
1983 (56th)	My Memories of Old Beijing	城南旧事	Mandarin	Wu Yigong	Not nominated
1984 (57th)	Life	人生	Mandarin	Wu Tianming	Not nominated
1986 (59th)	Dr. Sun Yat-sen	孙中山	Mandarin	Ding Yinnan	Not nominated
1987 (60th)	Hibiscus Town	芙蓉镇	Mandarin	Xie Jin	Not nominated
1988 (61st)	Red Sorghum	红高粱	Mandarin	Zhang Yimou	Not nominated
1989 (62nd)	The Birth of New China	开国大典	Mandarin	Li Qiankuan	Not nominated
1990 (63rd)	Ju Dou	菊豆	Mandarin	Zhang Yimou and Yang Fengliang	Nominated
1991 (64th)	The Spring Festival	过年	Mandarin	Huang Jianzhong	Not nominated
1992 (65th)	The Story of Qiu Ju	秋菊打官司	Mandarin	Zhang Yimou	Not nominated
1993 (66th)	Country Teachers	凤凰琴	Mandarin	He Qun	Not nominated
1995 (68th)	Red Cherry	红樱桃	Mandarin, Russian, German	Ye Daying	Not nominated
1998 (71st)	Genghis Khan	一代天骄成吉思汗	Mandarin, Mongolian	Sai Fu & Lisi Mai	Not nominated
1999 (72nd)	Lover's Grief over the Yellow River	黄河绝恋	Mandarin	Feng Xiaoning	Not nominated
2000 (73rd)	Breaking the Silence	漂亮妈妈	Mandarin	Sun Zhou	Not nominated
2002 (75th)	Hero	英雄	Mandarin	Zhang Yimou	Nominated
2003 (76th)	Warriors of Heaven and Earth	天地英雄	Mandarin	He Ping	Not nominated
2004 (77th)	House of Flying Daggers	十面埋伏	Mandarin	Zhang Yimou	Not nominated
2005 (78th)	The Promise	无极	Mandarin	Chen Kaige	Not nominated
2006 (79th)	Curse of the Golden Flower	满城尽带黄金甲	Mandarin	Zhang Yimou	Not nominated
2007 (80th)	The Knot	云水谣	Mandarin	Yin Li	Not nominated
2008 (81st)	Dream Weavers: Beijing 2008	筑梦	Mandarin	Yu Gun	Not nominated
2009 (82nd)	Forever Enthralled	梅兰芳	Mandarin	Chen Kaige	Not nominated
2010 (83rd)	Aftershock	唐山大地震	Mandarin	Feng Xiaogang	Not nominated
2011 (84th)	The Flowers of War	金陵十三釵	Mandarin, English	Zhang Yimou	Not nominated
2012 (85th)	Caught in the Web	搜索	Mandarin	Chen Kaige	Not nominated
2013 (86th)	Back to 1942	一九四二	Mandarin, English, Japanese	Feng Xiaogang	Not nominated
2014 (87th)	The Nightingale	夜莺	Mandarin	Philippie Muyl	Not nominated
2015 (88th)	Go Away Mr. Tumor	滚蛋吧！肿瘤君	Mandarin	Han Yan	Not nominated
2016 (89th)	Xuanzang	大唐玄奘	Mandarin	Huo Jianqi	Not nominated
2017 (90th)	Wolf Warrior 2	战狼2	Mandarin, English	Wu Jing	Not nominated
2018 (91st)	Hidden Man	邪不压正	Mandarin	Jiang Wen	Not nominated
2019 (92nd)	Ne Zha	哪吒之魔童降世	Mandarin	Jiaozi	Not nominated
2020 (93rd)	Leap	夺冠	Mandarin	Peter Chan	Not nominated
2021 (94th)	Cliff Walkers	悬崖之上	Mandarin	Zhang Yimou	Not nominated
2022 (95th)	Nice View	奇迹·笨小孩	Mandarin	Wen Muye	Not nominated
2023 (96th)	The Wandering Earth 2	流浪地球2	Mandarin	Frant Gwo	Not nominated
2024 (97th)	The Sinking of the Lisbon Maru	里斯本丸沉没	English, Mandarin	Fang Li	Disqualified
2025 (98th)	Dead to Rights	南京照相馆	Mandarin	Shen Ao	Not nominated
2026 (99th)	Once Upon a Time in the Middle East	欢迎来龙餐馆 / مرحبًا بكم في مطعمِ التنينِ	Mandarin, Arabic, English	Wen Muye	Pending

== See also ==
- List of Academy Award winners and nominees for Best International Feature Film
- List of Academy Award-winning foreign language films
- Cinema of China
- List of Hong Kong submissions for the Academy Award for Best International Feature Film
- List of Taiwanese submissions for the Academy Award for Best International Feature Film
