= Code Name: Cugar =

1989 Chinese thriller film

- Film poster
- Traditional Chinese: 代號美洲豹
- Simplified Chinese: 代号美洲豹
- Hanyu Pinyin: Dàiháo měizhōubào
- Directed by: Zhang Yimou; Yang Fengliang
- Written by: Cheng Shiqing
- Starring: Gong Li; Ge You; Liu Xiaoning; Wang Xueqi
- Cinematography: Gu Changwei
- Edited by: Du Yuan
- Music by: Guo Feng
- Production company: Xi'an Film Studio
- Release date: 1989
- Running time: 76 minutes
- Language: Mandarin

Code Name: Cugar (also known as Operation Puma) is a 1989 Chinese thriller film. It was co-directed by Zhang Yimou and Yang Fengliang. Unlike the bulk of Zhang's early works (ranging from 1986's Red Sorghum to 1995's Shanghai Triad), which were all historical pieces, Code Name: Cugar is a modern thriller involving a skyjacked airliner and political intrigue.

The film was made as a private investment by a friend of Zhang, but parts of their initial ideas were censored by the Chinese authorities. In the end, the film broke even but earned no profits. Zhang called it "a purely commercial gun chase film".

== Plot ==
The film follows a commercial airliner on a routine flight between Taipei and Seoul that is hijacked and taken to mainland China by the fictional Taiwan Revolutionary Army Front. Communist authorities cannot seize the plane because of the presence of an important business figure on the flight, and agree to cooperate discreetly with Taiwanese authorities to defuse an already tense situation.

== Cast ==
- Gong Li as A Li
- Ge You as Zheng Xianping
- Liu Xiaoning as Liang Zhuang
- Wang Xueqi as Huang Jingru
- Tian Min
- Yang Yazhou
- Yu Rongguang

== Release ==
According to film historian Tony Rayns, Code Name: Cugar has been released on VHS and DVD in China, but Yimou has been keen on it not being exported.

== Reception ==
Gong won Best Supporting Actress at the 1989 Hundred Flowers Awards.

The film is generally considered a failure or a footnote to Zhang's general oeuvre; Time referred to the film as Zhang Yimou's last "purely frivolous work."
