= Li Xiao (writer) =

Chinese writer

- Born: Li Xiaotang; July 28, 1950 (age 76); Shanghai, China
- Education: Fudan University
- Relatives: Ba Jin, father; Xiao Shan, mother
- Writing career
- Language: Chinese

Chinese name
- Traditional Chinese: 李曉
- Simplified Chinese: 李晓
Transcriptions
Standard Mandarin
- Hanyu Pinyin: Lǐ Xiǎo

Li Xiaotang
- Chinese: 李小棠
Transcriptions
Standard Mandarin
- Hanyu Pinyin: Lǐ Xiǎotáng

Li Xiao (born Li Xiaotang on 28 July 1950) is a Chinese writer based in Shanghai. He is the son of writer Ba Jin.

Born in Shanghai, Li worked in the countryside of Anhui during the Cultural Revolution for 8 years as a sent-down youth. After the Cultural Revolution, Li attended Fudan University.

Li Xiao's 1994 novel Rules of a Clan (门规) was adapted into a 1995 film Shanghai Triad directed by Zhang Yimou.

== Works translated into English ==
Year	Chinese title	Translated English title	Translator(s)
1986	屋顶上的青草	"Grass on the Rooftop"	Madeline K. Spring
1986	机关轶事	"Anecdotes from the Office"	Zhu Hong
1988	关于行规的闲话	"Rules of the Game"	Zhu Hong
1992	相会在K市	"Appointment in K City"	Zhu Hong
1992	民谣	"Folk Song"	Wu Xiaozhen, Qiu Maoru
1993	一种叫太阳红的瓜	"'Sunny Red' Melons"	Wu Xiaozhen, Qiu Maoru
