= Forever Love (2015 film) =

- Poster
- Chinese: 北京时间
- Directed by: An Zhanjun
- Production companies: Zhong Gong Bei Jing Municipal Publicity Department; Beijing Press and Publication Bureau; Beijing Media Network; Beijing TV Art Center; Bei Jing Ge Hua Wei Xian Dian Shi Wang Lao Gu Bin; Beijing Galloping Horse Media
- Distributed by: Beijing Xingmei Entertainment Distribution; Fenghai Media
- Release date: 11 December 2015
- Running time: 90 minutes
- Country: China
- Language: Mandarin
- Box office: CN¥10.9 million

Forever Love is a 2015 Chinese romantic drama film directed by An Zhanjun. It was released on 11 December 2015.

== Plot ==
Wang Xiaomo (Sun Yezhou), a young architect and second-generation rich man who has returned from overseas studies, is assigned to take care of Shi Changgong (Li Baotian), an old model worker who has already retired and suffers from a brain tumor, when he is thinking of making his mark after joining the company. Faced with an old laborer of his grandfather's generation who treats him badly, Wang Xiaomo and his girlfriend (played by Zhou Xuna) don't know what kind of attitude to take, and the three of them have a lot of quarrels and friction. However, the two of them are also curious and interested in the emotional experience of the old laborer. As they get to know Changgong, they discover an unforgettable romance between the young Shi Changgong (Ma Yuan) and Xue Yalan (Joan Chen), a technician who stayed in the Soviet Union to work on the construction site of the Great Hall of the People......

== Cast ==
- Joe Chen
- Li Baotian
- Ma Yuan
- Sun Yizhou
- Chrissie Chau

== Reception ==
The film has grossed CN¥10.9 million in China.
