= The Nightingale (2013 film) =

2013 film

- Film poster
- Directed by: Philippe Muyl
- Written by: Philippe Muyl
- Produced by: Paul Delbecq; Ning Ning; Hong Qin; Steve René
- Starring: Li Baotian
- Cinematography: Sun Ming
- Edited by: Manuel De Sousa; Kako Kelber
- Music by: Armand Amar
- Production companies: Stellar Mega Films; Envision Films; Pan Eurasia Films; Kinology; China Film Co-Production Corporation; CNC
- Release dates: 5 October 2013 (Busan); 7 May 2014 (France); 31 October 2014 (China)
- Running time: 100 minutes
- Countries: China; France
- Language: Mandarin

The Nightingale (Chinese: 夜莺; pinyin: yèyīng, French: Le Promeneur d'oiseau) is a 2013 Chinese-French drama film directed by Philippe Muyl. It was selected as the Chinese entry for the Best Foreign Language Film at the 87th Academy Awards, but was not nominated.

== Cast ==
- Li Baotian as Zhu Zhi Gen (Grandfather) (as Li Bao Tian)
- Li Xiaoran as Ren Quan Ying (Mother)
- Qin Hao as Zhu Chong Yi (Father)
- Yang Xinyi as Ren Xing

== See also ==
- List of submissions to the 87th Academy Awards for Best Foreign Language Film
- List of Chinese submissions for the Academy Award for Best Foreign Language Film
