= Qu Ying =

Chinese model and actress

Joie Qu Ying (simplified Chinese: 瞿颖; traditional Chinese: 瞿穎; pinyin: Qú Yǐng) is a Chinese model, actress, and singer.

== Life ==
Qu graduated from the modern drama class at Hunan Vocational College of Art, and later became a cast member in the Hunan Theatrical Company (now Hunan Performance Group).

In 1990, she started working as a professional model as she joined a fashion show team in Beijing and became one of China's first supermodels. She participated, and ended up as a runner-up, in the New Silk Road Chinese Modeling Competition (新丝路中国模特大赛) in 1991.

Qu made her television series debut in Plum Woman in 1990. She became known for her roles in Zhang Yimou's film Keep Cool (1997) and television series Love Talks (1999) and its spinoff Adieu (2003).

Qu started her singing career with the album Fly With Me in 1994 and signed with record company BMG in 1997.

== Filmography ==
- Six Years, Six Days (2017)
- Are You Ready to Marry Me (2014)
- Mystery (2012)
- Car Embarrassed (2012)
- Black Ransom (2010)
- Call for Love (2007)
- Magazine Gap Road (2007)
- I'm Seducible (2006)
- The Twins Effect II (2004)
- Asian Charlie's Angels (2004) (TV series)
- Fascination Amour (1999)
- Keep Cool (1997)
- Warriors of Virtue (1997)
