= Coming Home (2014 film) =

2014 film

- Theatrical release poster
- Traditional Chinese: 歸來
- Simplified Chinese: 归来
- Directed by: Zhang Yimou
- Screenplay by: Zou Jingzhi
- Based on: The Criminal Lu Yanshi by Geling Yan
- Produced by: William Kong; Zhao Zhang
- Starring: Chen Daoming; Gong Li; Zhang Huiwen
- Cinematography: Xiaoding Zhao
- Edited by: Zhang Mo
- Music by: Qigang Chen
- Production company: Le Vision Pictures
- Distributed by: Edko Films (Hong Kong); GAGA (Japan); Golden Village Pictures (Singapore); Sony Pictures Classics (USA)
- Release date: May 16, 2014
- Running time: 111 minutes
- Country: China
- Language: Mandarin
- Box office: US$49.7 million

Coming Home (Chinese: 归来; pinyin: guīlái; lit. 'The Return') is a 2014 Chinese historical drama film directed by Zhang Yimou and starring Chen Daoming, Gong Li, and Zhang Huiwen. It was released in the US on September 11, 2015, and first shown to the public on the May 20, 2014, at the Cannes Film Festival. The story is adapted from the novel The Criminal Lu Yanshi written by novelist Geling Yan.

== Plot ==
Lu Yanshi was a professor before being sent to the labor camp during the Cultural Revolution. He escapes from the labor camp in Xining to meet his long-missed wife Feng Wanyu and daughter Dandan. However, the police were already waiting outside the house to arrest him.

Dandan, a teenage ballerina, could not play the leading role in Red Detachment of Women due to her father's outlaw status. Under the temptation of regaining the leading role, Dandan reveals her parents' secret meeting plan to the police. The meeting ends with the capture of Lu, but Dandan still does not get the leading role.

After the end of the Cultural Revolution, Lu comes home only to find his family broken- his wife suffering from amnesia and his daughter working as a textile worker. Under the shock of a former official's sexual harassment, his wife sometimes mistakes Lu as Officer Fang instead of her husband. To reawaken his wife's memory, Lu disguises himself as a stranger so he can be near his wife. She recognizes him only as a letter reader or a piano tuner, and he never could live close enough with his chaste wife because of her trauma. During these years, Lu continued to write to his wife as a way of communicating with her and to convince her to forgive their daughter.

Several years later Feng is waiting to receive her husband outside the railway station on a snowy day, and Lu is standing with her, pretending to be a pedicab driver.

The movie script was based on the last 20 pages of Yan Geling's 400 page novel.

=== The novel ===
Yan Geling's novel The Criminal Lu Yanshi is a poignant family chronicle and a searing portrait of an entire generation of Chinese intellectuals crushed and humiliated during the Cultural Revolution. Narrated through the voice of a granddaughter, the book follows a returned scholar turned political prisoner. It exposes the physical torment, spiritual purgatory, and tragic personal fates endured in northwestern Laogai camps, while interweaving contrasting scenes of past urban life and oversea experience to underscore the absurdity and cruelty of the era. For Yan, the work represents her most challenging yet, marking a decisive turn toward mining her own family history, including her father's suffering and humiliation as a central, enduring resource.

To create the protagonist Lu Yanshi, Yan drew from the life of her paternal grandfather and another elderly relative, a middle-school principal. After being labeled a counter-revolutionary during the 1950s Anti-Rightist Campaign, the latter was incarcerated in a Qinghai "reeducation-through-labor" camp for nearly thirty years.

The full-length novel was published in October 2011, following the death of Yan's father at age 81.

== Cast ==
- Chen Daoming as Lu Yanshi
- Gong Li as Feng Wanyu, Lu Yanshi's wife
- Zhang Huiwen as Dandan, Yanshi and Wanyu's daughter
- Guo Tao
- Liu Peiqi
- Zu Feng
- Yan Ni
- Xin Baiqing
- Zhang Jiayi
- Chen Xiaoyi
- Ding Jiali

== Production ==
The film was shot in Tianjin and Beijing.

== Releases ==
Coming Home had its international premiere at the 2014 Cannes Film Festival in the out of competition section. It was scheduled to be screened in the Special Presentations section of the 2014 Toronto International Film Festival.

== Reception ==
=== Critical reception ===
On Rotten Tomatoes, the film has a rating of 89% based on 80 reviews, with an average rating of 7.6/10. The website's critics consensus reads: "The rare tearjerking melodrama with sociopolitical subtext, Coming Home plucks the heartstrings with thought-provoking power." According to Metacritic, which sampled 21 critics and calculated a weighted average score of 81 out of 100, the film received "universal acclaim".

While Yan Geling's novel delves more deeply into the protagonist's full life span and the broader historical devastation, the adaptation narrows focus to the post-Revolution aftermath, transforming political trauma into an intimate family melodrama that prioritizes emotional subtlety over explicit critique. The movie was praised its "heartbreaking" depiction of ordinary lives shattered by political upheaval, Gong Li's masterful performance conveying profound loss and resilience, and director Zhang's return to understated storytelling after his more extravagant works. Some critics have compared its epic gravity within domestic confines to classics like Doctor Zhivago. However, other observers note that the film "pulls up short" on historical reflection, muting the era's harsher realities in favor of tender resignation. This choice is often attributed to censorship pressures—a reality Yan herself alluded to when discussing the deviations from her original novel.

=== Box office ===
The film grossed ¥23.7 million (US$3.80 million) on the first day in China and reached US$46,000,000. It earned a total of US$49.7 million internationally.
