= Li Baotian =

Chinese actor

- 李保田
- Born: November 1946 (age 79); Jiawang District, Xuzhou, Jiangsu, China
- Education: Central Academy of Drama
- Occupation: Actor
- Years active: 1983 - present
- Organization(s): China Television Artists Association; China Film Association
- Notable work: Ju Dou; Liu Luoguo; The Great Doctor: Xi Laile
- Children: 1

Li Baotian (Chinese: 李保田; pinyin: Lǐ Bǎotián; born November 1946) is a Chinese actor. Li is a member of China Television Artists Association and China Film Association.

His career accolades include one Flying Apsaras Award, six China Golden Eagle Awards, and two Hundred Flowers Awards.

== Life ==
=== Early life ===
Li was born in Jiawang District of Xuzhou city, Jiangsu province in November 1946, during the Chinese Civil War, with his ancestral home in Wendeng, Shandong.

In February 1960, Li entered a local theatre to learn drama, he was transferred to Xuzhou Song and Dance Troupe in 1966, while the Cultural Revolution was launched by Mao Zedong, he learned to dance and sing for ten years.

Resumption of University Entrance Examination in 1977, Li he attended Central Academy of Drama in 1978, after graduating from 1981 he taught there.

=== Acting career ===
Li first came to the attention of the audience when he played a supporting role as Zhang Letian in Can Fan's film From Place to Place.

In 1985, Li starred in Wu Yinxun's comedy film The Wanderer and The Swan, which were highly praised by audience.

In 1987, Li was chosen to act as a support actor in Woman, Demon, Human, a film directed by Huang Shuqin, which garnered him a "Best Supporting Actor" at 8th China Golden Eagle Awards.

In 1988, Li participated in a TV series called Manager Ge, he was awarded for "Best Actor" at 8th Flying Apsaras Award.

In 1991, Li starred in Zhang Yimou's film Ju Dou as Yang Tianqing, alongside actress Gong Li.

In 1993, Li starred as President Yu in He Qun's film Country Teachers, which adapted from Liu Xinglong's novel of the same title, he won the Huabiao Award for Best Actor, Hundred Flowers Award for Best Actor and Golden Rooster Award for Best Actor.

In 1996, Li acted as Liu Yong in a historical television series Liu Luoguo, which earned him a China Golden Eagle Award for Best Actor.

Li won the "Best Supporting Actor" at the 1998 Hundred Flowers Awards for his performance in Keep Cool, and won the "Most Popular Actor" award at the 19th China Golden Eagle Awards for his performance in Policeman: Li Jiuping.

2003 proved to be a successful year for Li, he played the role of Xi Laile in a historical television series The Great Doctor: Xi Laile, for which he received nomination at the 2003 Flying Apsaras Award and won the two China Golden Eagle Awards.

For his role as Grandfather Zhi Gen in The Nightingale, Li won the Best Actor Award at the 1st Chinese Australian Film Festival.

In 2015, he was cast as Shi Changgong in the romantic drama film Forever Love, opposite Joe Chen, Sun Yizhou and Chrissie Chau.

On 18 October 2020, he won the Life Achievement TV Artist Award at the 30th China TV Golden Eagle Award.

In 2021, he co-starred with Ren Suxi in the film Miss Mom as the grandfather.

== Works ==
=== Film ===
Year	English title	Chinese title	Role	Notes
1983	From Place to Place	闯江湖	Zhang Letian	
1985	The Wanderer and The Swan	流浪汉与天鹅	Mo Zhuo	
1985		老君寨奇闻	guest	
1987	Do Not Call Me Ba Li	别叫我疤痢	guest	
1987	Two Virtuous Woman	贞女	guest	
1987	Woman, Demon, Human	人鬼情	Qiu Yun's father	
1988	Killer in the Wild	荒原杀手	Zhao Feng	
1990	Ju Dou	菊豆	Yang Tianqing	
1992	The Spring Festival	过年	guest	
1993	The Chinese People	中国人	guest	
1993	Grandpa Ge	葛老爷子	Grandpa	
1994	Country Teachers	凤凰琴	President Yu	
1994	Fire Ship	火船	guest	
1996	Shanghai Triad	摇啊摇，摇到外婆桥	Tang Laoda	
1996	Keep Cool	有话好好说	Zhang Qiusheng	
1997	after divorce, don't come to find me	离婚了，就别来找我	guest	
2006	Courthouse on the Horseback	马背上的法庭	guest	
2013	The Nightingale	夜莺	Zhi Gen	
2015	Forever Love	北京时间	Shi Changgong	
2018	The Connection	大路朝天	Tang Jinquan	
2021	Miss Mom	寻汉计	Grandfather	

=== Television ===
Year	English title	Chinese title	Role	Notes
1986	Manager Ge	葛掌柜	guest	
1988		师魂	guest	
1989	Good Men Good Women	好男好女	guest	
1991	the big road toward heaven	大路朝天	guest	
1992		山不转水转	guest	
1995	Liu Luoguo	宰相刘罗锅	Liu Yong	
1997	The Opium War	鸦片战争演义	guest	
1998	The Hookah	烟壶	guest	
1999	Life and Death in Two and A Half Weeks	生死两周半	guest	
1999	Qing's Manual	大清药王	guest	
1999	The Village Officer: Li Siping	村主任李四平	guest	
2000		石瀑布	Company commander	
2000	Policeman: Li Jiuping	警察李酒瓶	Li Jiuping	
2001	The Great Doctor: Xi Laile	神医喜来乐	Xi Laile	
2002	Dragon Gate	跃龙门	Zhang Bohang	
2003	The Biography of the Village Officer Wang	王保长新篇	Magistrate Wang	
2004		御前双雄	王爷	
2005		巡城御史鬼难缠	Gui Lanzha	
2005	Imperial Inspector Minister	钦差大臣		
2005		厨子当官	Shi Zhuxiang	
2007	The Biography of the Village Officer Wang 2	王保长新篇2	Magistrate Wang	
2008		南北大状		
2009	Never Again	永不回头		
2010	Clown Dad	丑角爸爸		
2011		杨乃武与小白菜冤案	Liu Xitong	
2011	Small Western-style Building	小洋楼		
2013	Legend of the Great Doctor: Xi Laile	神医喜来乐传奇	Xi Laile	

== Awards ==
Year	Work	Award	Result	Notes
1988	Manager Ge	8th Flying Apsaras Award for Outstanding Actor	Won	
1988	Woman, Demon, Human	8th China Golden Eagle Award for Best Supporting Actor	Won	
1993	Country Teachers	Huabiao Award for Best Actor	Won	
1994	Country Teachers	17th Hundred Flowers Award for Best Actor	Won	
1994	Country Teachers	14th China Golden Eagle Award for Best Actor	Won	
1996	Liu Luoguo	China Golden Eagle Award for Best Actor	Won	
1998	Keep Cool	Hundred Flowers Award for Best Supporting Actor	Won	
2000		Top Ten Artist in Beijing	Won	
2000		China Golden Eagle Award for Most Popular Actor	Won	
2000		China Golden Eagle Award for Most Popular Artist	Nominated	
2001	Policeman: Li Jiuping	19th China Golden Eagle Award for Favourite Actor	Won	
2003	The Great Doctor: Xi Laile	23rd Flying Apsaras Award for Outstanding Actor	Nominated	
2003	The Great Doctor: Xi Laile	21st China Golden Eagle Award for Most Popular Actor	Won	
2003	The Great Doctor: Xi Laile	21st China Golden Eagle Award for Favourite Actor	Nominated	
2003	The Great Doctor: Xi Laile	21st China Golden Eagle Award for Best Performing Actor	Won	
2013	The Nightingale	Best Actor Award at the 1st Chinese Australian Film Festival	Won	
2020		Life Achievement TV Artist Award at the 30th China TV Golden Eagle Award	Won	
