= Zhao Jiping =

Chinese composer

Zhao Jiping (simplified Chinese: 赵季平; traditional Chinese: 趙季平; pinyin: Zhào Jìpíng) (b. Pingliang, Gansu, China, August 1945) is a Chinese composer from Shaanxi. He is best known for his film scores for the Fifth Generation Chinese director Zhang Yimou. He is the current Honorary Chairman of the Chinese Musicians' Association.

Zhao studied at the Central Conservatory of Music in Beijing.

== Film scores ==
- Yellow Earth
- A Chinese Odyssey
- Red Sorghum
- Raise the Red Lantern
- The Story of Qiu Ju
- Farewell, My Concubine
- Red Firecracker, Green Firecracker
- To Live
- The Water Margin
- The Emperor and the Assassin
- Three Kingdoms
