= Liu Heng (writer) =

Chinese writer (born 1954)

- 刘恒
- Born: May 1954 (age 72); Beijing
- Resting place: Beijing
- Education: Beijing Normal University
- Occupations: Novelist, screenwriter
- Writing career
- Language: Chinese
- Period: 1977 - present
- Genres: Novel, drama
- Notable works: Fu Xi, Fu Xi; Black Snow
- Literary movement: Literary Realism

Chinese name
- Simplified Chinese: 刘恒
- Traditional Chinese: 劉恆
Transcriptions
Standard Mandarin
- Hanyu Pinyin: Liú Héng

Liu Heng (Chinese: 刘恒; pinyin: Liú Héng; born in May 1954) is a Chinese writer. He is generally seen as a realist writer. He became a professional writer in the 1970s after having worked as a peasant farmer, a factory worker and a soldier, classes which have served as fodder for his stories and, not coincidentally, classes which Mao Zedong promoted as the audience for literature in his 1942 Talks At The Yenan Forum On Literature And Art. "Dogshit Food" won the 1985-86 best short story award. "Fuxi Fuxi" won him the national Prize for Best Novelettes in 1987, and was the basis for the film Ju Dou. His novel "Hēi de xuě" (Black Snow; 黑的雪), about the problems faced by a young juvenile delinquent upon his release from prison, was made into a feature film, and "Pínzuǐ Zhāng Dàmín dē xìngfú shēnghuó" (The Happy Life of Chatter-box Zhang Damin; 贫嘴张大民的幸福生活) has been made into a television series in the same name.

== Early life ==
Liu Heng was born in May 1954 in Beijing. Liu's native place is Mentougou District, Beijing. He attended the affiliated primary school and junior school of Beijing Foreign Studies University. In 1966, Mao Zedong, the Chairman of China, started the Cultural Revolution, with all the schools were closed, so Liu and his mother had to back to the countryside and did farm works. Later, schools were open again. Liu joined the PLA Navy after graduating from the junior school. In 1975, Liu left the army and returned to Beijing, the superior offered him two works to choose: Beijing Museum of History and Beijing Agricultural Machinery Research Institute. As a result, Liu exchanged with a demobilized soldier and he became an assembler in Beijing Automobile Works, while worked on the assembly line.

In 1977, Liu wrote his first short story Small Millstone, which is published on Literature of Beijing. As a result, Liu was chosen to do trainee work in the editorial department of Literature of Beijing. Later, he became an official editor who worked for Yang Mo, a female writer. Liu once edited Wang Anyi, Chen Jiangong, and Su Tong's works. From 1985 to 1987, Liu felt that he didn't have enough knowledge and he studied in special class for cadre of Beijing Normal University for 3 years. In 1986, Liu Heng published his short stories - Dogshit Food, Wolves's Home, and Strength. Among the three works, Dogshit Food won the National Excellent Award for Short Story.

In 1986, Liu left Literature of Beijing and joined Beijing Writer's Association. His career began. He was awarded the Lao She Literary Award in 2000.

== Works ==
Short stories

- "Dogshit Food" (狗日的粮食 Gǒurì de Liángshi) tr. Sabina Knight. In Joseph S. M. Lau and Howard Goldblatt, eds., Columbia Anthology of Modern Chinese Literature. NY: Columbia University Press, 1995, 416-428. ISBN 0-231-08002-6
- "Grain." Tr. William Riggle. Chinese Literature (Summer 1990): 3-17.
- "The Heated Earthen Bed." trs. Ren Zhong and Yuzhi Yang. In Hometowns and Childhood. San Francisco: Long River Press, 2005, 97-104 ISBN 1-59265-058-9
- The Obsessed. tr. David Kwan. Beijing: Panda Books, 1991. (includes "Fuxi, Fuxi" 伏羲伏羲) ISBN 7-5071-0072-3; 083512083X

Novels

- Black Snow: A Novel of the Beijing Demimonde (黑的雪). trs. Howard Goldblatt. NY: Atlantic Monthly Press, 1993 ISBN 0-87113-530-2
- Green River Daydreams: A Novel (Cang He bai ri meng 苍河白日梦). tr. Howard Goldblatt. New York: Grove Press, 2001 ISBN 0-8021-1690-6
