= Ju Dou =

- Film poster
- Directed by: Zhang Yimou; Yang Fengliang
- Based on: Fuxi Fuxi by Liu Heng
- Produced by: Zhang Wenze; Yasuyoshi Tokuma; Hu Jian
- Starring: Gong Li; Li Baotian; Li Wei; Zhang Yi
- Cinematography: Gu Changwei
- Edited by: Du Yuan
- Music by: Zhao Jiping
- Production companies: China Film Co-Production Corporation; China Film Export and Import Corp.; Tokuma Shoten; Tokuma Communications
- Distributed by: Daiei (Japan)
- Release date: 1990
- Running time: 95 minutes
- Countries: China; Japan
- Language: Mandarin
- Box office: $2 million

Ju Dou (Chinese: 菊豆; pinyin: Jú Dòu) is a 1990 Mandarin-language romantic drama film directed by Zhang Yimou and Yang Fengliang, starring Gong Li as the title character. The film, based on the novel Fuxi, Fuxi (伏羲伏羲) by Liu Heng, is a tragedy that revolves around Ju Dou, a beautiful young woman sold as a wife to Jinshan, an elderly cloth dyer. The film was produced using the vivid Technicolor process, long after it had been abandoned in the United States. It became the first Chinese film to be nominated for an Academy Award for Best Foreign Language Film.

Upon its release, Ju Dou faced a ban in China, which was lifted in July 1992. Li Ruihuan reversed the ban after viewing the film.

== Plot ==
Ju Dou is set in the early 20th century in rural China. Yang Tianqing (Li Baotian) returns from a journey to sell silk for his adoptive uncle, Yang Jinshan (Li Wei). Jinshan, a fabric dyer, is notorious for his cruelty. Upon Tianqing's return, another worker is fired by Jinshan. This worker informs Tianqing that Jinshan has recently acquired a new wife, having previously beaten his two wives to death when they failed to bear him a son. Ironically, Jinshan is impotent.

When Tianqing meets the new wife, Ju Dou (Gong Li), he becomes infatuated with her. At night, Jinshan subjects Ju Dou to torture. Tianqing discovers Ju Dou's bathing area and secretly observes her. Unbeknownst to him, Ju Dou is aware of his presence. Initially, Tianqing voyeuristically watches, but Ju Dou transforms his gaze by revealing her bruises and weeping, compelling him to see her as a human being rather than just a sexual object.

Eventually, their passion becomes uncontrollable, and Tianqing and Ju Dou engage in a sexual relationship. When Ju Dou discovers she is pregnant with Tianqing's child, she and Tianqing deceive Jinshan by pretending the child is his. Jinshan suffers a stroke that leaves him paralyzed from the waist down. After Ju Dou confesses the truth to him, Jinshan attempts to kill the child and set the house on fire. Tianqing restrains Jinshan by suspending him in a barrel, rendering him a powerless witness to their usurpation. Aware that society would never accept her infidelity, Ju Dou seeks an abortion at a nunnery. Jinshan continues to exert influence over the child, Tianbai, whom he named, and when the child addresses Jinshan as "Father," Jinshan interprets it as psychological revenge against his wife and nephew. One day, despite his doting on Tianbai, Jinshan falls into a dye vat and drowns as Tianbei looks on and laughs.

Seven years later, Ju Dou and Tianqing still operate the dye mill, but Tianbai (Zheng Ji'an) has become an angry teenager. Rumors of his parents' infidelity drive him to nearly kill a local gossipmonger. In a fit of rage, Ju Dou reveals the truth about his parentage to Tianbai. Overwhelmed, she and Tianqing decide to have one final encounter but succumb to exhaustion and fall asleep in a cellar with limited air supply. Upon discovering his parents in a weakened state in the cellar, Tianbai drags them out and drowns Tianqing. Ju Dou, in turn, sets fire to the mill as the film concludes.

== Adaptation ==
In the original novel, Tianqing is Jinshan's biological nephew, and the story revolves around a taboo relationship based on affinity. However, the creators of the film adaptation chose to exclude the incestuous element. In the film, Tianqing and Jinshan are portrayed as unrelated by blood, and Ju Dou initiates her relationship with Tianqing only after discovering their non-biological connection.

== Cast ==
- Gong Li, as Ju Dou (S: 菊豆, T: 菊荳, P: Jú Dòu);
- Li Baotian, as Yang Tianqing (S: 杨天青, T: 楊天青, P: Yáng Tiānqīng), Ju Dou's lover and Yang Jinshan's adopted nephew;
- Li Wei, as Yang Jinshan (S: 杨金山, T: 楊金山, P: Yáng Jīnshān), the owner of the dye mill and Ju Dou's husband;
- Yi Zhang, as Yang Tianbai (S: 杨天白, T: 楊天白, P: Yáng Tiānbái) as a child; Ju Dou and Tianqing's son;
- Zheng Ji'an, as Tianbai as a youth.

== Release and reception ==
Ju Dou was released by Miramax Films in March 1991. The film was banned by the Chinese authorities and not screened in the country. The Beijing Review magazine stated this was due to "exposing too much darkness", referencing sexual activity and intrigue not depicted in most Chinese films.

=== Critical response ===
On the review aggregator website Rotten Tomatoes, 100% of 23 critics' reviews are positive, with an average rating of 8.5/10. Metacritic, which uses a weighted average, assigned the film a score of 79 out of 100, based on 18 critics, indicating "generally favorable" reviews.

=== Awards ===
Ju Dou became the first Chinese film to be nominated for an Academy Award. The Chinese government, having already banned the film the year before, attempted to withdraw the film from the awards ceremony, but this request was denied by the Academy of Motion Picture Arts and Sciences. Acting Minister of Culture He Jingzhi ordered that two officials at the Chinese Film Bureau, including its chief, Teng Jinxian, and leaders of the China Film Group Corporation write self-criticisms admitting wrongdoing for selecting the film for nomination and drawing worldwide attention to it. Zhang Yimou, however, faced no difficulties regarding his career for directing the film, and suggested it had been banned for its negative depiction of the older character of Jinshan in a country whose government was composed largely of older men.

- Cannes Film Festival, 1990
  - Luis Buñuel Special Award
  - Palme d'Or (nominated)
- Valladolid International Film Festival, 1990
  - Golden Spike
- Chicago International Film Festival, 1990
  - Gold Hugo
- Norwegian International Film Festival, 1990
  - Best Foreign Feature Film (Amanda)
- 63rd Academy Awards, 1991
  - Best Foreign Language Film (nominated)

=== Accolades ===
- Time Out 100 Best Chinese Mainland Films – No. 21
- Included in The New York Times's list of The Best 1000 Movies Ever Made in 2004

== Home media ==
Ju Dou was initially released on DVD in the United States as an all-region disc on the Pioneer label, Geneon Entertainment, on June 29, 1999. The disc included English subtitles.

The film was re-released by Razor Digital Entertainment on February 14, 2006, as part of the new Zhang Yimou collection to capitalize on Zhang's recent international successes of Hero and House of Flying Daggers. The new edition was Region 1 and included English, simplified Chinese, and traditional Chinese subtitles. Despite the DVD box stating that the film is presented in widescreen, it is actually presented in full frame.

== See also ==
- List of submissions to the 63rd Academy Awards for Best Foreign Language Film
- List of Chinese submissions for the Academy Award for Best Foreign Language Film
