= Shanghai Triad =

1995 Chinese crime-drama film

- Film poster
- Traditional Chinese: 搖啊搖，搖到外婆橋
- Simplified Chinese: 摇啊摇，摇到外婆桥
- Literal meaning: Row, Row, Row to Grandma's Bridge
- Hanyu Pinyin: Yáo a Yáo, Yáo Dào Wàipó Qiáo
- Directed by: Zhang Yimou
- Written by: Bi Feiyu
- Based on: Rules of a Clan by Li Xiao
- Produced by: Yves Marmion; Jean-Louis Piel; Wu Yigong
- Starring: Gong Li; Li Baotian; Li Xuejian; Sun Chun; Wang Xiaoxiao
- Cinematography: Lü Yue
- Edited by: Du Yuan
- Music by: Zhang Guangtian
- Distributed by: Sony Pictures Classics (U.S.)
- Release dates: May 1995 (Cannes); 22 December 1995 (U.S.)
- Running time: 103 minutes
- Country: China
- Language: Mandarin
- Box office: $2,086,101 (USA)

Shanghai Triad is a 1995 Chinese crime-drama film, directed by Zhang Yimou and starring Gong Li. The script is written by Bi Feiyu based on Li Xiao's 1994 novel Rules of a Clan (门规). The film is set in the criminal underworld of 1930s Shanghai, Republic of China and spans seven days. Shanghai Triad's Chinese title reads "Row, row, row to Grandma Bridge", which refers to a well known traditional Chinese lullaby.

The film was the seventh collaboration between director Zhang Yimou and actress Gong Li, ending a successful partnership that had begun with Zhang's debut, Red Sorghum (1987), and had evolved into a romantic relationship as well. With the wrapping of filming for Shanghai Triad the two agreed to end their relationship both professionally and personally. Zhang and Gong would not work together again until 2006's Curse of the Golden Flower.

== Plot ==
Fourteen-year-old Tang Shuisheng moves from the countryside to Shanghai in order to work for a Triad Boss, who is a distant relative. He is taken to a warehouse where two rival groups of Triads carry out an opium deal that goes wrong, leaving one of the rival members dead. Shuisheng is then taken by his uncle to the Boss's palatial home, where he is assigned to serve the mysterious Xiao Jinbao, a cabaret singer and mistress of the Boss. He soon learns Jinbao is also having an affair with the Boss's number two man, Song.

On the third night, Shuisheng witnesses a bloody gang fight between the Boss and a rival, Fat Yu, in which his uncle is killed. The Boss and a small entourage retreat to an island, where the Boss recovers from his injuries from the fight. There, Jinbao befriends Cuihua, a widowed peasant with a cheerful young daughter, Ajiao. Jinbao spies on Cuihua and learns she has a secret lover, a man from a neighboring island, who she plans to marry soon. However, the Boss orders the man killed, since no one is allowed to enter or leave the island without his permission in case they reveal his location to his enemies. Furious, Jinbao confronts the Boss and tells Shuisheng to leave Shanghai. She reveals to him that she also grew up in the countryside.

By the seventh day, Song arrives on the island along with Zheng, the Boss's number three man. Shuisheng, while defecating in the reeds, overhears two men plotting to kill Jinbao. He rushes back and interrupts the Boss's mahjong game to tell him what he heard. The Boss and Jinbao confront Song with evidence of his treachery, as the Boss had already known about his betrayal. The gang kills Song's men and buries him alive. The Boss then informs Jinbao that she will have to die as well for her role in Song's betrayal, since she knew he planned to overthrow him. Jinbao is calm until she learns that he has killed Cuihua for knowing too much and he plans to take Ajiao back to Shanghai, prompting her to futilely attack the Boss. As Shuisheng attempts to save her from her fate, he is dragged away and beaten.

The film ends with Shuisheng tied to the sails of the ship as it sails back to Shanghai. Ajiao sails back with them, unaware Cuihua and Jinbao are dead. The Boss tells her that Shuisheng needs to learn how to be loyal to the proper people, and that Ajiao will grow up to be just like Jinbao.

== Cast ==
- Wang Xiaoxiao as Tang Shuisheng, the young teenage boy who serves as the film's protagonist and he falls under the spell of the boss's mistress, Jinbao.
- Gong Li as Xiao Jinbao, a Shanghai nightclub singer, Jinbao is the mistress of the Triad Boss.
- Li Xuejian as Uncle Liu, a servant to a Triad organization and Tang Shuisheng's uncle.
- Li Baotian as Tang the Triad Boss who hides a ruthless side.
- Sun Chun as Song, the Boss's number two man, Song's affair with Jinbao sets up the film's main conflict.
- Fu Biao as Zheng, the Boss's number three man.
- Yang Qianguan as Ajiao, a young girl living on the secluded island with her mother.
- Jiang Baoying as Cuihao, Ajiao's mother, a peasant woman who prepares meals for the Boss while he is hiding on his island estate.

== Production ==
Shanghai Triad was director Zhang Yimou's seventh feature film. Zhang's previous film, To Live had landed the director in trouble with Chinese authorities, and he was temporarily banned from making any films funded from overseas sources. Shanghai Triad was therefore only allowed to continue production after it was officially categorized as local production. The director has since noted that his selection of Shanghai Triad to follow up the politically controversial To Live was no accident, as he hoped that a "gangster movie" would be a conventional film.

The film was originally intended to be a straight adaptation of the novel Gang Law by author Li Xiao. This plan eventually changed with Gong Li's character becoming more important and the story's viewpoint shifting to that of the young boy, Tang Shuisheng. As a result, the film's title was changed to reflect its new "younger" perspective.

== Reception ==
Though perhaps less well known than some of Zhang Yimou's more celebrated films (notably Ju Dou, To Live and Raise the Red Lantern), Shanghai Triad has an approval rating of 90% on review aggregator website Rotten Tomatoes, based on 31 reviews, and an average rating of 7/10. The website's critical consensus states: "Well-acted and beautifully filmed, Shanghai Triad deftly depicts a young man's coming of age against the backdrop of mob violence and its punishing legacy". Metacritic assigned the film a weighted average score of 77 out of 100, based on 25 critics, indicating generally favourable reviews.

With its headline position in the New York Film Festival, The New York Times' critic Janet Maslin opened her review that despite the clichéd genre of the "gangster film," Shanghai Triad nevertheless "movingly affirms the magnitude of [Zhang Yimou's] storytelling power." Derek Elley of the entertainment magazine Variety similarly found the film to be an achievement, particularly in how it played with genre conventions, calling the film a "stylized but gripping portrait of mob power play and lifestyles in 1930 Shanghai." Roger Ebert, however, provided a counterpoint to the film's praise, arguing that the choice of the boy as the film's main protagonist ultimately hurt the film, and that Shanghai Triad was probably "the last, and ... certainly the least, of the collaborations between the Chinese director Zhang Yimou and the gifted actress Gong Li" (though Gong would again work with Zhang in 2006's Curse of the Golden Flower). Even Ebert however, conceded that the film's technical aspects were well executed, calling Zhang one of the "best visual stylists of current cinema."

=== Awards and nominations ===
- Cannes Film Festival (1995)
  - Technical Grand Prize
- Camerimage Awards (1995)
  - Golden Frog — Lü Yue (nominated)
- Los Angeles Film Critics Association Awards (1995)
  - LAFCA Award, Best Cinematography — Lü Yue
- New York Film Critics Circle Awards (1995)
  - NYFCC Award, Best Cinematography — Lü Yue
- National Board of Review (1995)
  - NBR Award, Best Foreign Language Film
- 53rd Golden Globe Awards (1996)
  - Golden Globe, Best Foreign Language Film (nominated)
- 68th Academy Awards (1996)
  - Best Cinematography — Lü Yue (nominated)

== Retail release ==
Shanghai Triad was released on December 12, 2000 in the United States on region 1 DVD by Sony Pictures' Columbia TriStar label. The DVD edition includes English and Spanish subtitles. The DVD is in the widescreen letterbox format with an aspect ratio of 1.85:1. Blu-ray with 108 minute runtime was released on August 4, 2020.

== See also ==
- Triads — Chinese underground societies that play a major part of the film
