= The Road Home (1999 film) =

- Theatrical release poster

Chinese name
- Traditional Chinese: 我的父親母親
- Simplified Chinese: 我的父亲母亲
- Literal meaning: My Father and Mother
Transcriptions
Standard Mandarin
- Hanyu Pinyin: wǒde fùqin mǔqin
- Directed by: Zhang Yimou
- Screenplay by: Bao Shi
- Based on: Remembrance by Bao Shi
- Produced by: Zhang Weiping; Zhao Yu
- Starring: Zhang Ziyi; Sun Honglei; Zheng Hao; Zhao Yulian
- Narrated by: Sun Honglei
- Cinematography: Hou Yong
- Edited by: Zhai Rui
- Music by: San Bao
- Production companies: Columbia Pictures Film Production Asia; Guangxi Film Studios
- Distributed by: Beijing New Picture Distribution Company (HK); Sony Pictures Classics (US)
- Release date: 16 October 1999
- Running time: 89 minutes
- Country: China
- Language: Mandarin
- Box office: $6.8 million

The Road Home (Chinese: 我的父親母親; lit. 'My Father and Mother') is a 1999 Chinese romantic drama film directed by Zhang Yimou. It also marked the cinematic debut of the Chinese actress Zhang Ziyi. The Road Home was written by author Bao Shi, who adapted the screenplay from his novel, Remembrance. It tells the story of a country girl and a young teacher falling in love, and the teacher's death many years later that brings their son back from the big city for the funeral.

The film was shot immediately after Zhang Yimou's previous film, Not One Less, and was released to positive reviews in China on October 16, 1999.

== Plot ==
The film begins in black and white in 1999 China, when Luo Yusheng (Sun Honglei) returns to his village from the city upon hearing of his father's death. His mother, Zhao Di (Zhao Yulian), insists upon following the tradition of carrying the coffin back to their remote village on foot so that her husband's spirit will remember its way home. As the narrator, Yusheng recounts the story of his parents' courtship, so famous that it has gained the status of a legend in the village. It is here that the bleak black and white turns into vivid colors as the story shifts to the past.

His father, Luo Changyu (Zheng Hao), came to the village as a teacher. Immediately, Zhao Di (Zhang Ziyi) became infatuated with him, and he reciprocated her feelings. Thus began a courtship which consisted mostly of the exchange of looks and glances between the two. Unfortunately, the courtship was interrupted when Luo was summoned by the government to return to the city. (Note: Several reviewers have speculated that the flashback portion of the film is set during the Anti-Rightist Campaign (1957–1959) and that Luo's recall was for investigation and questioning.) With her heart broken, Zhao Di insisted on waiting for him outside, becoming ill to the point that the villagers thought she would die. However, upon hearing news of her illness, the teacher was able to sneak back to the village, and Zhao Di, in tears, welcomed the sight of her beloved. Still, their love would not be consummated for a few more years because the teacher was kept away from the village as punishment for having left his assignment in the city without permission.

Returning to 1999, and black and white, Yusheng realizes how important this ritual of carrying the coffin back to the village is to his mother, Zhao Di, and he agrees to make all necessary arrangements to fulfill her wish. He is told by the mayor of the village that it might be difficult to find enough porters to carry the father home, as there are few young, able men left in the village. The mayor and Yusheng agree on how to pay the porters. But when the procession sets out, more than 100 people show up to help carry home the casket of the man who was their teacher through various generations in the village. The mayor returns Yusheng's money, as no one will accept payment for doing what they consider to be an honor rather than a task.

On the morning of the day Yusheng leaves to return to his job in the city, he fulfills his father's dream and teaches a class in the old schoolhouse that was central to his parents' romance, using the textbook his father had written himself.

== Cast ==
- Zhang Ziyi as the young Zhao Di, the protagonist in the middle segment of the film.
  - Zhao Yulian as the old Zhao Di, in the beginning and ending segments.
- Zheng Hao as Luo Changyu, a young teacher sent from the city, Zhao Di's husband and the narrator's father.
- Sun Honglei as Luo Yusheng, Zhao Di and Luo Changyu's grown son and the film's narrator, who returns to his home village to bury his father.
- Li Bin as Grandmother, Zhao Di's elderly mother and the narrator's grandmother.

== Reception ==
The Road Home received positive reviews. It won two awards at the 2000 Berlin International Film Festival: the Jury Grand Prix (second best film) and Prize of the Ecumenical Jury. On the review aggregator website Rotten Tomatoes, the film achieved an approval rating of 89% based on 80 reviews, with an average rating of 7.4/10. The site's critical consensus reads, "Beautifully filmed, The Road Home is a simple touching and tender love story." On Metacritic, the film has a weighted average score of 71 out of 100 based on 25 critic reviews, indicating "generally favorable reviews". Praises especially went to the film's visual style and actress Zhang Ziyi's performance, which was her cinematic debut.

=== Awards ===
==== 2000 Golden Rooster Awards ====
- Best Picture
- Best Art Direction — Cao Juiping
- Best Director — Zhang Yimou

==== 2000 Hundred Flowers Awards ====
- Best Film
- Best Actress — Zhang Ziyi

==== 2000 Berlin International Film Festival ====
- Silver Bear — Jury Grand Prix
- Prize of the Ecumenical Jury
- Golden Bear (nominated)

==== 2000 Ljubljana International Film Festival ====
- Audience Award

==== 2001 Bodil Awards ====
- Best Non-American Film (nominated)

==== 2001 Sundance Film Festival ====
- Audience World Cinema Award

==== 2001 Chicago Film Critics Association Awards ====
- Best Foreign Language Film (nominated)

==== 2001 Fajr Film Festival ====
- Crystal Simorgh for Best Film, International Competition

==== 2001 Florida Film Festival ====
- Audience Award for Best International Feature Film

== See also ==
- Cinema of China
- Anti-Rightist Movement — Political background of the film

Awards
Preceded by Postmen in the Mountains	Golden Rooster for Best Picture; 2000 tied with Roaring Across the Horizon and Fatal Decision	Succeeded by Mao Zedong, 1925
