= Zhang Yimou =

Chinese filmmaker

- 张艺谋
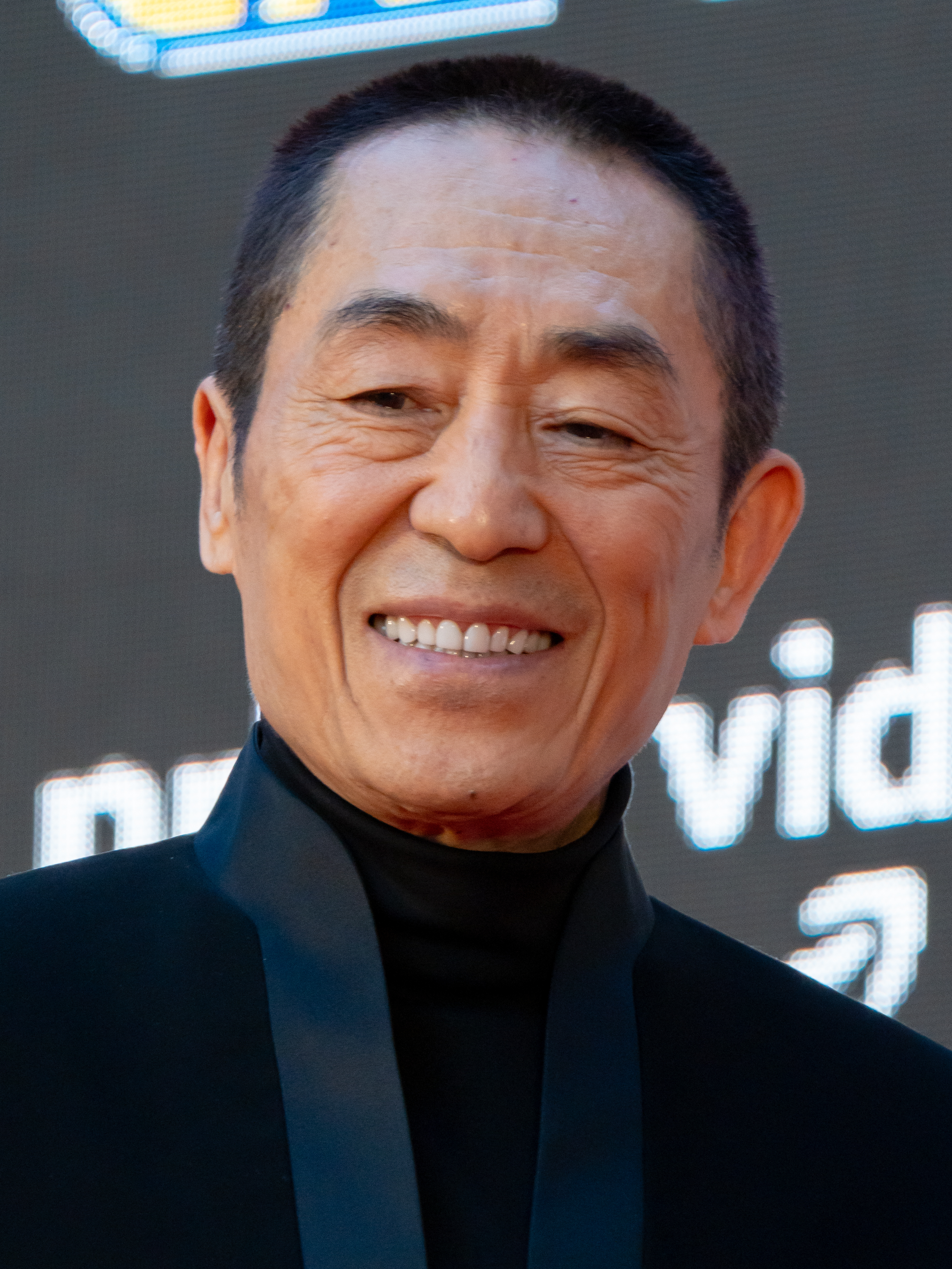
- Zhang in 2023
- Born: Xi'an, Shaanxi, China
- Education: Beijing Film Academy
- Occupations: Film director; producer; cinematographer; actor
- Known for: One of the representative figures of China's "fifth generation directors"
- Notable work: Full River Red; Hero; Cliff Walkers; The Flowers of War
- Spouses: Xiao Hua (肖华) (m. 1978; div. 1988); Chen Ting (陈婷) (m. 2011)
- Children: 4, including Zhang Mo
- Awards: § Awards and nominations

Zhang Yimou
- Zhang's name in Simplified (top) and Traditional (bottom) Chinese characters
- Simplified Chinese: 张艺谋
- Traditional Chinese: 張藝謀
Transcriptions
Standard Mandarin
- Hanyu Pinyin: Zhāng Yìmóu
- Bopomofo: ㄓㄤ ㄧˋ ㄇㄡˊ
- Wade–Giles: Chang^{1} I^{4}-mou^{2}
- IPA: [ʈʂáŋ î.mǒʊ]
Yue: Cantonese
- Yale Romanization: Jēung Ngaihmàuh
- Jyutping: Zoeng^{1} Ngai^{6}-mau^{4}
- IPA: [tsœŋ˥ ŋɐj˨.mɐw˩]

Zhang Yimou (simplified Chinese: 张艺谋; traditional Chinese: 張藝謀; pinyin: Zhāng Yìmóu) is a Chinese filmmaker. A leading figure of China's Fifth Generation directors, he is considered as one of the most successful filmmakers in the world.

After graduating from the Beijing Film Academy, Zhang was assigned as a cinematographer at the Guangxi Film Studio in 1982. He made his acting debut in Old Well (1987), for which he won the Best Actor at the Tokyo International Film Festival, and made his directorial debut with Red Sorghum (1988), which won the Golden Bear at the Berlin International Film Festival. One of Zhang's early recurring themes is the resilience of ordinary people, as in To Live (1994) and Not One Less (1999). Beginning with Hero (2002), which marked the Chinese film industry's transition into large-scale commercial productions, his work increasingly engaged with grand narratives on politics and history, as in Curse of the Golden Flower (2006), The Flowers Of War (2011) and Under the Light (2023). His films are also noted for their rich use of colour, as in Raise the Red Lantern (1991) and House of Flying Daggers (2004), and for their portrayals of women that propelled "Mou Girls" to stardom, such as Gong Li, Zhang Ziyi and Ni Ni. His highest-budgeted film to date is the all-star The Great Wall (2016), which also became his greatest bomb. His highest-grossing film to date is Full River Red (2023), which became the seventh highest-grossing film of all time in China.

Zhang directed the opening and closing ceremonies of the 2008 Beijing Summer Olympic Games as well as the opening and closing ceremonies of the 2022 Beijing Winter Olympic Games. Since 2004, Zhang has collaborated with local governments across China to promote tourism through the “Impression” series of outdoor live stage productions, beginning with "Impression Liu Sanjie" in Yangshuo. Despite his frequent official affiliations, Zhang has, at various points in his career, fallen foul of Chinese censors.

Zhang was awarded an honorary doctorate from Yale University in 2010 and from Boston University in 2018. In 2022, he joined the Beijing Film Academy as a distinguished professor.

== Early life and education ==
Zhang's father, Zhang Bingjun (张秉钧), a dermatologist, had been an officer in the National Revolutionary Army under Chiang Kai-shek during the Chinese Civil War; an uncle and an elder brother had followed the Nationalist forces to Taiwan after their 1949 defeat. Zhang's mother, Zhang Xiaoyou (张孝友), was a doctor at the 2nd Hospital affiliated Xi'an Jiao Tong University who graduated from Xi'an Medical University. He has two younger brothers, Zhang Weimou (张伟谋) and Zhang Qimou (张启谋). As a result of his family's ties to the Nationalist movement, Zhang faced difficulties in his early life.

During the Cultural Revolution of the 1960s and 1970s, Zhang left his school studies and went to work, first as a farm labourer for 3 years, and later at a cotton textile mill for 7 years in the city of Xianyang. During this time he took up painting and amateur still photography, selling his own blood to buy his first camera.

When Gaokao was reinstated, and the Beijing Film Academy reopened its doors to new students in 1978, Zhang, at 28, was over the Cinematography Department's admission age limit of 22, and lacked requisite academic qualifications. With the help of relatives in Beijing, Zhang appealed to the faculty members as well as prominent artists, such as Bai Xueshi, Huang Yongyu, and Hua Junwu, then the Ministry of Culture's general secretary. Hua presented Zhang's photography portfolio to Huang Zhen, Minister of Culture, who, impressed by Zhang's talent, instructed the academy to admit him as a two-year auditing student. After two years, Zhang managed to become an official student and completed the full four-year program. He graduated with the BFA class of 1982, which also included Chen Kaige, Tian Zhuangzhuang, and Zhang Junzhao. The class went on to form the core of the Fifth Generation, who were a part of an artistic reemergence in China after the end of the Cultural Revolution.

== Career ==
=== Film ===
==== Beginnings through 1980s ====
After graduating from the academy, Zhang and his fellow graduates were assigned to various state-run studios. Zhang was posted to the Guangxi Film Studio as a cinematographer and remained formally affiliated with the studio throughout his career, during which he was appointed honorary studio director, before retiring from its state employment system in 2011.

Though originally intended to work as director's assistants, the graduates soon discovered there was a dearth of directors so soon after the Cultural Revolution, and gained permission to start making their own films. This led to the production of Zhang Junzhao's One and Eight, on which Zhang Yimou worked as director of photography, and Chen Kaige's Yellow Earth, in 1984. Both films were screened to critical acclaim at the Hong Kong Film Festival, marking a departure from the propagandist cinema of the Cultural Revolution and helping draw international attention to Chinese cinema. Yellow Earth is today widely considered the inaugural film of the Fifth Generation directors.

In 1985, after moving back to his home town of Xi'an, Zhang was engaged as cinematographer and lead actor for director Wu Tianming's upcoming film Old Well, which was subsequently released in 1987. The lead role won Zhang a Best Actor award at the Tokyo International Film Festival.

1988 saw the release of Zhang's directorial debut, Red Sorghum, starring Chinese actress Gong Li in her first leading role. Red Sorghum was met with critical acclaim, bringing Zhang to the forefront of the world's art directors, and winning him a Golden Bear for Best Picture at the 38th Berlin International Film Festival in 1988.

Code Name: Cugar, a minor experiment in the political thriller genre, was released in 1989, featuring Gong Li and eminent Chinese actor Ge You. However, it garnered less-than-positive reviews at home and Zhang himself later dismissed the film as his worst. In the same year, Zhang began work on his next project, the period drama Ju Dou. Starring Gong Li in the eponymous lead role, along with Li Baotian as the male lead, Ju Dou garnered as much critical acclaim as had Red Sorghum and became China's first film to be nominated for an Academy Award for Best Foreign Language Film. Ju Dou highlighted the way in which the "gaze" can have different meanings, from voyeurism to ethical appeal. In 1989, Zhang became a member of the jury at the 16th Moscow International Film Festival.

==== 1990s ====
After the success of Ju Dou, Zhang began work on Raise the Red Lantern. Based on Su Tong's novel Wives and Concubines, the film depicted the realities of life in a wealthy family compound during the 1920s. Gong Li was again featured in the lead role, her fourth collaboration with Zhang as director. Raise the Red Lantern received almost unanimous international acclaim. Film critic Roger Ebert of the Chicago Sun-Times noted its "voluptuous physical beauty" and sumptuous use of colours. Gong Li's acting was also praised as starkly contrasting with the roles she played in Zhang's earlier films. Raise the Red Lantern was nominated in the Best Foreign Language Film category at the 1992 Academy Awards, becoming the second Chinese film to earn this distinction (after Zhang's Ju Dou). It eventually lost out to Gabriele Salvatores's Mediterraneo.

Zhang's next directorial work, The Story of Qiu Ju, in 1992, once again starring Gong Li in the lead role. The film, which tells the tale of a peasant woman seeking justice for her husband after he was beaten by a village official, was a hit at film festivals and won the Golden Lion award at the 1992 Venice Film Festival.

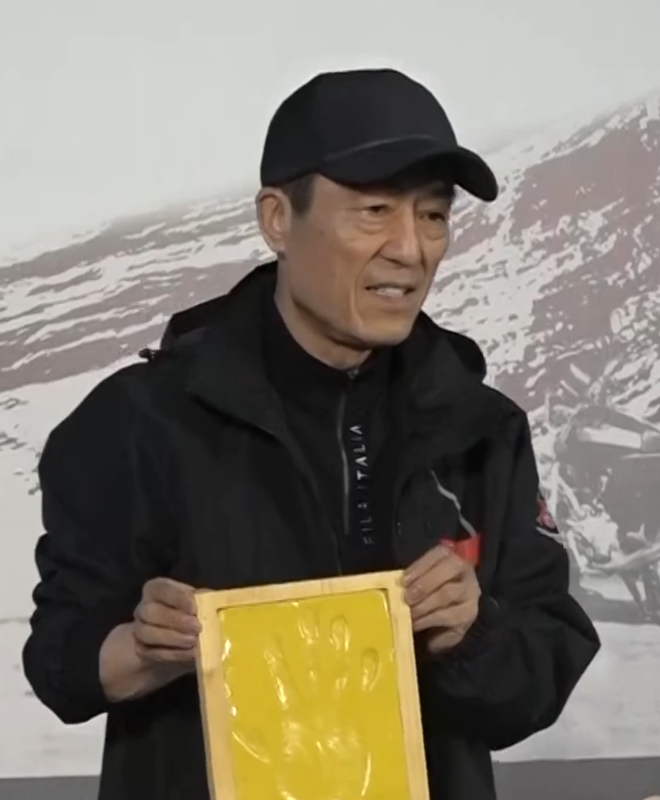
Zhang as a director

Next, Zhang directed To Live, an epic film based on the novel by Yu Hua of the same name. To Live highlighted the resilience of the ordinary Chinese people, personified by its two main characters, amidst three generations of upheavals throughout Chinese politics of the 20th century. It was banned in China, but released at the 1994 Cannes Film Festival and won the Grand Jury Prize, as well as earning a Best Actor prize for Ge You. To Live was officially banned but still shown in theaters in China.

Shanghai Triad followed in 1995, featuring Gong Li in her seventh film under Zhang's direction. The two had developed a romantic as well as a professional relationship, but this would end during production of Shanghai Triad. Zhang and Gong would not work together again until 2006's Curse of the Golden Flower.

1997 saw the release of Keep Cool, a black comedy film about life in modern China. Keep Cool marked only the second time Zhang had set a film in the modern era, after The Story of Qiu Ju. As in The Story of Qiu Ju, Zhang returned to the neorealist habit of employing non-professional actors and location shooting for Not One Less in 1999 which won him his second Golden Lion prize in Venice. Shot immediately after Not One Less, Zhang's 1999 film The Road Home featured a new leading lady in the form of the young actress Zhang Ziyi, in her film debut. The film is based on a simple throw-back narrative centering on a love story between the narrator's parents.

==== 2000–present ====
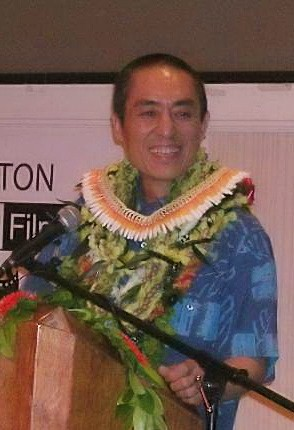
Zhang at the Hawaii International Film Festival in 2005

Happy Times, a relatively unknown film by Zhang, was based loosely on the short story Shifu: You'll Do Anything for a Laugh, by Mo Yan. Starring popular Chinese actor Zhao Benshan and actress Dong Jie, it was an official selection for the Berlin International Film Festival in 2002.

Zhang's next major project was the ambitious wuxia drama Hero, released in China in 2002. With an impressive lineup of Asian stars, including Jet Li, Maggie Cheung, Tony Leung Chiu-Wai, Zhang Ziyi, and Donnie Yen, Hero told a fictional tale about Ying Zheng, the King of the State of Qin (later to become the first Emperor of China), and his would-be assassins. The film was released in North America in 2004, two years after its Chinese release, by American distributor Miramax Films, and became a huge international hit. Hero was one of the few foreign-language films to debut at number 1 at the U.S. box office, and was one of the nominees for Best Foreign Language Film at the 2003 Academy Awards.

Zhang followed up the huge success of Hero with another martial arts epic, House of Flying Daggers, in 2004. Set in the Tang dynasty, it starred Zhang Ziyi, Andy Lau, and Takeshi Kaneshiro as characters caught in a dangerous love triangle. House of Flying Daggers received acclaim from critics, who noted the use of colour that harked back to some of Zhang's earlier works.

Released in China in 2005, Riding Alone for Thousands of Miles was a return to the more low-key drama that characterized much of Zhang's middle period pieces. The film stars Japanese actor Ken Takakura, as a father who wishes to repair relations with his alienated son, and is eventually led by circumstance to set out on a journey to China. Zhang had been an admirer of Takakura for over thirty years.

2006's Curse of the Golden Flower saw him reunited with leading actress Gong Li. Taiwanese singer Jay Chou and Hong Kong star Chow Yun-fat also starred in the period epic based on a play by Cao Yu.

Zhang's recent films, and his involvement with the 2008 Olympic ceremonies, have not been without controversy. Some critics claim that his recent works, contrary to his earlier films, have received approval from the Chinese government. However, in interviews, Zhang has said that he is not interested in politics, and that it was an honour for him to direct the Olympic ceremonies because it was "a once-in-a-lifetime opportunity". In 2008, he won a Peabody Award "for creating a spell-binding, unforgettable celebration of the Olympic promise, featuring a cast of thousands" at the opening ceremony of the Beijing Olympics. On 24 May 2010, Zhang was awarded an honorary Doctor of Fine Arts degree by Yale University, and was described as "a genius with camera and choreography".

While filming The Flowers of War in 2011, Zhang invited Palestinian filmmaker Annemarie Jacir to be his protege on set for one year as part of the Rolex Mentor and Protégé Arts Initiative. The Flowers of War was his most expensive film to date, budgeting for $90.2 million, until his 2016 The Great Wall surpassed it with a budget of $150 million. After the mixed reception and financial disappointment of The Great Wall, Zhang returned in 2018 with the critically acclaimed Shadow, which received 12 nominations at the 55th Golden Horse Awards and won four, including Best Director.

In 2026, Zhang served as the president of the Competition jury at the 31st Busan International Film Festival.

=== Stage direction ===
Starting in the 1990s, Zhang Yimou has been directing stage productions in parallel with his film career. In 1998, he directed an acclaimed version of Puccini's opera Turandot, firstly in Florence and then later Turandot at the Forbidden City, Beijing, with Zubin Mehta conducting, the latter documented in the film The Turandot Project (2000). He reprised his version of Turandot in October 2009, at the Bird's Nest Stadium in Beijing, and plans to tour with the production in Europe, Asia and Australia in 2010. In 2001, Zhang adapted his 1991 film Raise the Red Lantern for the stage, directing a ballet version.

Zhang has co-directed a number of outdoor folk musicals under the title Impression. These include Impression, Liu Sanjie, which opened in August 2003 at the Li River, Guangxi province; Impression Lijiang, in June 2006 at the foot of Jade Dragon Snow Mountain in Lijiang, Yunnan province; Impression West Lake, in late 2007 at the West Lake in Hangzhou, Zhejiang province; Impression Hainan in late 2009, set in Hainan Island; and Impression Dahongpao set on Mount Wuyi, in Fujian province. All five performances were co-directed by Wang Chaoge and Fan Yue.

Zhang also led the production of Tan Dun's opera, The First Emperor, which had its world premiere at the Metropolitan Opera on 21 December 2006. In 2017 he directed an innovative ballet titled "2047 Apologue", where the 12 minute solo finale The Weaving Machine was choreographed by Rose Alice Larkings and including hundreds of LED lamps. Onstage as Rose Alice danced the 12 minute solo was an elderly Chinese weaver at her loom, highlighting the old crafts and industries which remain so important in a world of new technology.

=== 2008 and 2022 Beijing Olympics opening and closing ceremonies ===
Zhang was chosen to direct the Beijing portion of the closing ceremonies of two Olympics: the 2004 Summer Olympics in Athens, Greece, and 2018 Winter Olympics in Pyeongchang, South Korea. He directed the opening and closing ceremonies of the 2008 Summer Olympics in Beijing, China, alongside co-director and choreographer Zhang Jigang. He also directed the opening and closing ceremonies of the 2022 Winter Olympics and 2022 Winter Paralympics.

Zhang was a runner-up for the Time Magazine Person of the Year award in 2008. Steven Spielberg, who withdrew as an adviser to the Olympic ceremonies to pressure China into helping with the conflict in Darfur, described Zhang's works in the Olympic ceremonies in Time magazine, saying "At the heart of Zhang's Olympic ceremonies was the idea that the conflict of man foretells the desire for inner peace. This theme is one he's explored and perfected in his films, whether they are about the lives of humble peasants or exalted royalty. This year he captured this prevalent theme of harmony and peace, which is the spirit of the Olympic Games. In one evening of visual and emotional splendor, he educated, enlightened, and entertained us all."

== Style ==
In terms of style and personality, he leans towards a director's thinking of sensation and intuition. This kind of director's thinking focuses on visual perception, emphasizing elements such as composition, color, and lighting, and using a vivid and intuitive visual style to reflect or express the subject's emotions.

The films created by Zhang Yimou can meet the needs of the times and social development in terms of artistic expression, incorporating some of his own thinking and exploration, with a focus on macro social themes and contemporary thinking.

Reception of Zhang Yimou's films has been mixed. While some critics praise his striking aesthetics and ability to break into the Western art market, some Chinese-based critics have accused Zhang of pandering to Western audiences and portraying China as weak, exotic, and vulnerable.

== Personal life ==
=== Relationship ===
==== Xiao Hua ====
Zhang Yimou's first wife is Xiao Hua. Xiao was born in Xi'an in 1951 to an intellectual family whose ancestral home was in Beijing. At the age of four, Xiao was sent to live with her grandmother in Beijing, where she grew up. In 1965, she returned to Xi'an to attend the middle school and became a classmate of Zhang. After graduation, Zhang invited Xiao to join him in the Down to the Countryside Movement to settle in rural Shaanxi. Xiao agreed and they were sent to Qian County for 3 years, when they began a relationship. In 1971, Zhang and Xiao returned to Xi'an. Zhang became a worker at a cotton mill in Xianyang, while Xiao was assigned to a factory in Xingping County. Starting in 1972, China allowed workers, farmers, and soldiers to apply for university. Xiao tried but failed the entrance exams for two consecutive years. In 1975, she was recommended for admission to Shanghai Jiao Tong University. Zhang, having been deprived of the opportunity for college education due to his "anti-revolutionary" family background, discouraged her from attending, saying, "You'll grow close to your university classmates, find common ground with them, and eventually look down on me." As a result, Xiao declined the opportunity.

In 1978, the national college entrance exam was reinstated in China and Zhang applied to the Beijing Film Academy. The age limit for the Cinematography Department was 22, and 28-year-old Zhang was initially rejected. Through Xiao's brother-in-law, eventually, Zhang managed to get his photography portfolio to Huang Zhen, then China's Minister of Culture. Huang appreciated Zhang's work and approved his admission. Before heading to Beijing for his studies, he and Xiao had a modest wedding. After graduating in 1982, Zhang was assigned to Guangxi Film Studio as a cinematographer, rarely returning home. On March 31, 1983, their daughter Zhang Mo was born while Zhang was filming One and Eight in Guangxi. In October 1987, while doing Zhang's laundry, Xiao found a love letter from Gong Li in his pocket. A few days later, Xiao received a call from Gong's then boyfriend, who told her: "I've met with Zhang Yimou. He said that his relationship with you was a misunderstanding that arose from your time in the countryside." In 1988, Zhang and Xiao divorced.

==== Gong Li ====
Zhang's personal and professional relationship with his muse Gong Li has been highly publicized. Their relationship started in 1986 on the set of Red Sorghum, when Zhang was married to Xiao while Gong was in a relationship with another man. Gong's then-boyfriend was a classmate named Yang Jianxun, who had reportedly assaulted her after learning that, while acting in Red Sorghum, she worked predominantly with men. Gong Li also told Zhang that her boyfriend attacked her after finding out about their relationship. In 1988, Zhang divorced Xiao for Gong. In 1995, soon after shooting Shanghai Triad, their 7th collaboration during their relationship, Zhang announced their break-up amidst rumors of Gong's affair with then managing director of British American Tobacco in China, Ooi Hoe Seong (whom she married a year later). According to Gong's mother, however, they split due to Zhang's reluctance to marry Gong after their 9-year relationship. According to Zhou Xiaofeng, Zhang Yimou's script consultant, producer Zhang Weiping deliberately sabotaged the relationship between the director and actress by spreading lies and rumors, including claims of her affair with Ooi. This alleged strategy aimed to exploit Zhang Yimou while sidelining his more tactful and decisive partner, ultimately leading to a feud between Gong and the producer. After their break-up, Zhang invited Gong to star in his films Hero and House of Flying Daggers, but she declined both. They reunited in 2006 for the film Curse of the Golden Flower, during which Gong stipulated in her contract that she would not meet the producer Zhang Weiping.

==== Chen Ting ====
In 1999, 19-year-old Chen Ting met Zhang when she auditioned for his film Happy Times. The two began a secret relationship, and their first son, Zhang Yinan, was born in 2001, followed by their second son, Zhang Yiding, in 2004, and their daughter, Zhang Yijiao, in 2006. The couple married in December 2011 in Wuxi, Jiangsu, where Chen lives, in order to secure hukou for their children. Their secret marriage and children were first revealed on the evening of January 11, 2012, through an anonymous text message sent to Chinese journalists, which also included the residential address of Zhang's mother-in-law. On March 11, 2012, the rumor gained wider attention when actress He Jun—who had been a backup candidate for the cast of The Flowers of War but was dismissed after disclosing her involvement on Weibo in December 2010—made similar allegations on Weibo. It was suggested that He is a niece of the assistant to Zhang Weiping, Zhang Yimou's former business partner until their split in 2012, and that Weiping allegedly orchestrated He's revelation—a claim He denied. Further online allegations claimed that Zhang had fathered seven children with four different women. Zhang was subsequently investigated by the authorities for violating China's one-child policy. On 29 November 2013, under the public pressure, Zhang admitted in a statement that he and his wife, Chen Ting, have two sons and a daughter, and that they would cooperate with Wuxi's family planning authorities for an investigation and accept any legal consequences. The statement also suggested that certain individuals had used illegal means to expose Zhang's privacy. On January 9, 2014, the Wuxi Family Planning Bureau fined the couple 7,487,854 RMB (roughly US$1.2 million) for violating China's one-child policy. On May 31, 2021, as China promulgated a three-child policy, Chen posted a poster titled "The Three-Child Policy Is Here" on Weibo, with the caption "Mission accomplished ahead of time." Zhang Yimou's studio reposted her Weibo.

=== Feud ===
==== Zhang Weiping ====
Zhang Weiping (no relation) first met Zhang Yimou in 1989 while working in pharmaceutical procurement at a hospital in Beijing. At the time, Zhang Weiping's elder brother worked in customs, and Zhang Weiping himself later worked for the German company Siemens as a customs broker. This position facilitated the development of a close friendship with Zhang Yimou, as the latter's film reels frequently required customs clearance for overseas processing. In the 1990s, Zhang Weiping transitioned into business. In 1996, when Zhang Yimou's film Keep Cool faced a funding crisis following Gong Li's withdrawal due to her breakup with the director, which led other investors to pull out, Zhang Weiping stepped in with an investment of 26 million yuan. Keep Cool went on to gross 46 million yuan, becoming China's highest-grossing domestic film of the year. Despite incurring a personal loss of nearly 10 million yuan due to weak overseas copyright sales, Zhang Weiping's confidence in the potential of the Chinese film industry was bolstered by the film's domestic box office success. From that point onward, Zhang Weiping became Zhang Yimou's investor, producer, and business partner for 16 years. In 1997, they co-founded New Pictures and collaborated on 11 films. However, Zhang Yimou left the company in 2012 after an acrimonious split, stemming from years of business and creative disputes and precipitated by the critical and commercial underperformance of The Flowers of War.

After the split, according to Fate: Zhang Yimou the Lonely, a 2015 biography written by Zhou Xiaofeng, Zhang Yimou's script consultant since 2006, Zhang Weiping orchestrated the revelation of Zhang Yimou's secret remarriage and children, which violated China's one-child policy. Since 2015, Zhang Yimou filed three lawsuits against Zhang Weiping and his New Pictures company to recover unpaid earnings. In 2015, Zhang Yimou sought 15 million yuan in box office revenue share from A Woman, a Gun and a Noodle Shop. Meanwhile, his wife, Chen Ting, disclosed on Weibo that during the two men's 16-year collaboration, Zhang Yimou had only been paid 12 million yuan in total. She also accused Zhang Weiping of falsely claiming to the family planning authorities that Zhang Yimou earned an annual salary of millions of yuan, allegedly to increase fines imposed for violating the one-child policy. In 2019, the court awarded Zhang Yimou only 2.46 million yuan from his original claim of 15 million yuan. Zhang Weiping refused to comply, resulting in his placement on the list of judgment defaulters. The same year, New Pictures was shut down. In 2020, Zhang Yimou filed the second lawsuit against Zhang Weiping, seeking 2.59 million yuan in unpaid labor fees. Zhang Yimou won the case and the court dismissed Zhang Weiping's appeal. In 2021, Zhang Yimou filed the third lawsuit against Zhang Weiping, citing "shareholder liability for harming the interests of company creditors."

==== Yan Geling ====
In 2022, Chinese-born American novelist Yan Geling, who had previously collaborated with Zhang on The Flowers of War (2011) and Coming Home (2014), accused the director of copyright infringement for removing her name from the credits of One Second (2020), adapted from her novella The Criminal Lu Yanshi, after Yan was blacklisted in China for criticizing the government. Yan and her husband Lawrence Walker, who serves as her manager, stated that while they understood the constraints of the Chinese market, they found it unacceptable that distributors and festivals outside China had similarly declined to credit her. They filed suits in the United States, France, and Germany against the film's producer, Beijing Huanxi Media Group, and its international distributors.

== Filmography ==
=== Director ===
Year	English title	Chinese title	Notes/Ref.
1988	Red Sorghum	红高粱	
1989	Code Name: Cugar	代号美洲豹	Co-director with Yang Fengliang
1990	Ju Dou	菊豆	Co-director with Yang Fengliang
1991	Raise the Red Lantern	大红灯笼高高挂	
1992	The Story of Qiu Ju	秋菊打官司	
1994	To Live	活着	
1995	Shanghai Triad	摇啊摇，摇到外婆桥	
1995	Zhang Yimou	—N/a	Segment of Lumière and Company
1997	Keep Cool	有话好好说	
1999	Not One Less	一个都不能少	
1999	The Road Home	我的父亲母亲	
2000	Happy Times	幸福时光	
2002	Hero	英雄	Also co-screenplayer writer, story credits and producer
2004	House of Flying Daggers	十面埋伏	
2005	Riding Alone for Thousands of Miles	千里走单骑	
2006	Curse of the Golden Flower	满城尽带黄金甲	
2007	Movie Night	—N/a	Segment of To Each His Cinema
2009	A Woman, a Gun and a Noodle Shop	三枪拍案惊奇	
2010	Under the Hawthorn Tree	山楂树之恋	
2011	The Flowers of War	金陵十三钗	
2014	Coming Home	归来	
2016	The Great Wall	长城	
2018	Shadow	影	
2020	One Second	一秒钟	
2021	Cliff Walkers	悬崖之上	
2022	Sniper	狙击手	Co-director with Zhang Mo
2023	Full River Red	满江红	
2023	Under the Light	坚如磐石	
2024	Article 20	第二十条	
2026	Scare Out	惊蛰无声	

=== Cinematographer ===
Year	English title	Chinese title
1982	Red Elephant	红象
1983	One and Eight	一个和八个
1984	Yellow Earth	黄土地
1986	Old Well	老井
1986	The Big Parade	大阅兵

=== Actor ===
Year	English title	Chinese title	Role	Notes
1986	Old Well	老井	Sun Wangquan	Won the Golden Rooster Award for Best Actor
1988	Red Sorghum	红高粱		
1989	Fight and Love with a Terracotta Warrior	古今大战秦俑情	Tian Fong	
1997	Keep Cool	有话好好说	Junk Peddler	
2001	The Grand Mansion Gate	大宅门	Li Lianying	
2021	My Country, My Parents	我和我的父辈	Television president	Cameo in AD MAN (Segment 3)

== Awards, nominations, recognition ==
Zhang gained initial notability as the cameramanin Chen's Yellow Earth (1984), which won 11 international awards. His achievement of Best Actor at the 1987 Tokyo International Film Festival for his work in Wu's Old Well gave him the opportunity to start directing.

He went on to achieve awards such as the Golden Bear (best film) at the Berlin Film Festival for his directorial debut, Red Sorghum, the Golden Lion (best film) at the Venice Film Festival for both The Story of Qiu Ju and Not One Less, and the Grand Prix du Jury at Cannes for To Live.

Later, he was granted Lifetime Achievement Awards by the Tokyo International Film Festival and the Asian Film Awards, in 2023 and 2024 respectively.

Among other ways in which Zhang Yimou's achievements have been recognized, are two honorary doctorates from Western universities, one from Boston University in 2008, and another from Yale University in 2010.

Year	Title	Awards/Nominations
1988	Red Sorghum	Golden Bear
1990	Ju Dou	Golden Spike; Gold Hugo; Nominated- Chinese submission for the Academy Award for Best Foreign Language Film
1991	Raise the Red Lantern	Silver Lion; BAFTA Award for Best Foreign Language Film; National Society of Film Critics Award for Best Foreign Language Film; New York Film Critics Circle Award for Best Foreign Language Film; David di Donatello for Best Foreign Film; Nominated- Hong Kong submission for the Academy Award for Best Foreign Language Film
1992	The Story of Qiu Ju	Golden Lion; National Society of Film Critics Award for Best Foreign Language Film
1994	To Live	Grand Prix du Jury; Prize of the Ecumenical Jury; BAFTA Award for Best Foreign Language Film; Nominated- Palme d'Or; Nominated- Golden Globe Award for Best Foreign Language Film
1995	Shanghai Triad	National Board of Review Award for Best Foreign Language Film; Nominated- Golden Globe Award for Best Foreign Language Film
1999	Not One Less	Golden Lion
1999	The Road Home	Silver Bear Jury Grand Prix; Prize of the Ecumenical Jury
2002	Hero	Alfred Bauer Prize; Nominated- Chinese submission for the Academy Award for Best Foreign Language Film
2004	House of Flying Daggers	National Society of Film Critics Award for Best Director; Nominated- BAFTA Award for Best Film not in the English Language; Nominated- Golden Globe Award for Best Foreign Language Film
2011	The Flowers of War	Nominated- Golden Globe Award for Best Foreign Language Film
2018	Shadow	Golden Horse (Best Director)
2020	One Second	Asian Film Award (Best Director)

== See also ==
- Mou girls
- Cinema of China
- Fukuoka Asian Culture Prize
- Zhang Jigang
