= Yang Fengliang =

Chinese film director

Yang Fengliang is a Chinese film director. He is best known for co-directing the Oscar-nominated film Ju Dou (1990) with Zhang Yimou.
