= Gong Li =

Chinese-born Singaporean actress (born 1965)

- 鞏俐
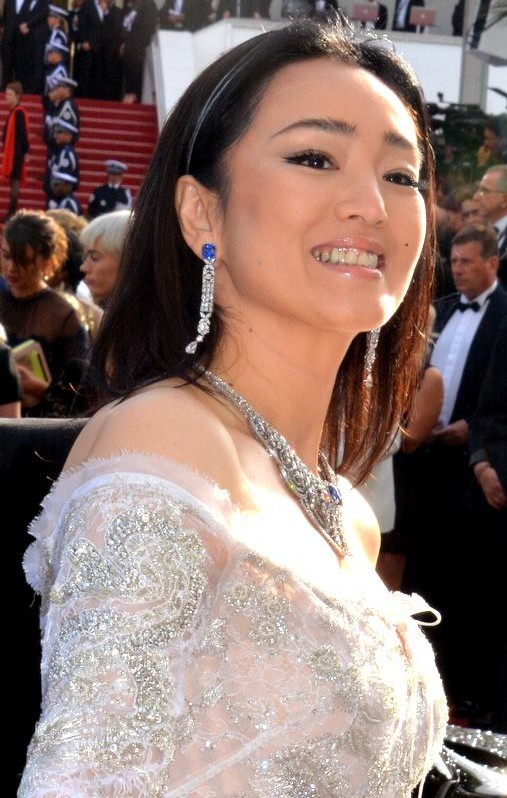
- Gong Li in 2016
- Born: 31 December 1965 (age 60); Shenyang, Liaoning, China
- Citizenship: China (1965–2008); Singapore (2008–)
- Education: Central Academy of Drama (BA)
- Occupations: Actress, model
- Years active: 1987–present
- Works: Filmography
- Spouses: Ooi Hoe Soeng (m. 1996; div. 2009) Jean-Michel Jarre (m. 2019)
- Awards: Full list

Chinese name
- Simplified Chinese: 巩俐
- Traditional Chinese: 鞏俐
Transcriptions
Standard Mandarin
- Hanyu Pinyin: Gǒng Lì
- Wade–Giles: Kung Li

Gong Li (simplified Chinese: 巩俐; traditional Chinese: 鞏俐; born 31 December 1965) is a Chinese-born Singaporean actress. Known for her versatility and naturalistic performances, she is regarded as one of the best actresses in Chinese cinema. She starred in three Chinese-language films that have been nominated for the Academy Award for Best International Feature Film.

Gong was born in Shenyang, Liaoning, and grew up in Jinan, Shandong. She enrolled at the Central Academy of Drama in Beijing, from where she graduated in 1989. While a student at the academy, she was spotted by director Zhang Yimou and debuted in Zhang's Red Sorghum in 1987. Gong and Zhang's professional and personal relationship received much coverage in the Chinese-speaking world, as they continued to collaborate on a string of critically acclaimed movies, including the Oscar-nominated features Ju Dou (1990) and Raise the Red Lantern (1991). For her role in the Zhang-directed The Story of Qiu Ju (1992), Gong won the Volpi Cup for Best Actress at the 49th Venice International Film Festival.

Gong also starred in the Chen Kaige-directed Oscar-nominated Farewell My Concubine (1993), for which she won Best Supporting Actress at the New York Film Critics Circle Awards. In English-language films, she won the National Board of Review Award for Best Supporting Actress for Memoirs of a Geisha (2005), directed by Rob Marshall. Other notable appearances include Flirting Scholar (1993), To Live (1994), Chinese Box (1997), The Emperor and the Assassin (1998), Breaking the Silence (2000), Zhou Yu's Train (2003), Eros (2004), Miami Vice (2006), Curse of the Golden Flower (2006) and Saturday Fiction (2019).

Gong was the head of jury at the 2000 Berlin Film and the 2002 Venice Film Festivals, the first Asian to hold such a position for either event. Over the course of her career, Gong won several accolades, including four Hundred Flowers Awards, a Hong Kong Film Award, two Golden Rooster Awards, a Berlin Film Festival, two Cannes Film Festival and Venice Film Festival honors and a David di Donatello Award nomination. She was appointed as a Commander (Commandeur) of the Ordre des Arts et des Lettres by the government of France in 2010.

== Early life ==
Gong Li was born in Shenyang, Liaoning, China, as the youngest of five children. Her father, Gong Lize, had been a professor of economics at Liaoning University until being transferred to Shandong University a few years before the Cultural Revolution. Her mother, Zhao Ying, originally a college teacher, followed her husband to Shandong and became an accountant at a state-run cotton mill.

Gong grew up in Jinan, the capital of Shandong. She studied in Jinan Sanhe Street Primary School (now Shandong Experimental Primary School). At school, she developed an interest in singing, dancing, and imitation. In Grade 2, she participated in her school's performing arts troupe. Later, she and her classmates were invited to Shandong People's Radio Station to sing children's songs in praise of the oil workers in Daqing.

Gong spent six years at Jinan No.2 Middle School. In 1983, she took her first Gaokao, applying to two art programs at Shandong Normal University and Qufu Normal University, but failed to gain admission. The following year, she applied to Shandong Art Academy and the People's Liberation Army Arts College, but was unsuccessful again. Her parents discouraged her from pursuing it further, but Gong persisted by working part-time while taking acting lessons from director Yin Dawei in Jinan. In 1985, encouraged by Yin, she applied to the Central Academy of Drama in Beijing. Despite scoring 11 points at Gaokao below the requirement, the academy petitioned for her special admission, which was eventually granted by the Ministry of Culture, the superior department then in charge of the academy. Gong was admitted to the Central Academy of Drama in 1985 and graduated in 1989.

== Acting career ==
=== 1987–1989: Career beginnings ===
In 1987, while at college, Gong was discovered by Zhang Yimou, who cast her for the lead role in Red Sorghum, his first film as a director. The film won the Golden Bear at the 38th Berlin International Film Festival, becoming the first Chinese film to win this award. It also won the Golden Rooster Awards and the Hundred Flowers Awards for Best Picture in 1988.

In 1989, Gong starred in Zhang Yimou's second counterterrorism film, Code Name: Cugar, for which she won the Hundred Flowers Awards for Best Supporting Actress, ushering in a new stage of exploring acting skills and style. On the same year, she took part in the 1989 Tiananmen Square protests and according to her, Tiananmen taught her that she should have her own opinion, "not just follow blindly."

=== 1990–1999: Fifth generation filmmakers and international spotlight ===
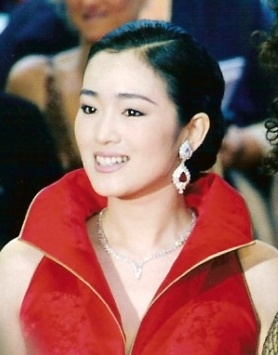
Gong at the 1998 Cannes Film Festival

Over the several years following her 1987 acting debut in Red Sorghum, Gong received international acclaim for her roles in several more Zhang Yimou films.

In 1990, Gong Continued to cooperate with Zhang Yimou and starred in his family ethics movie Ju Dou, which won the Luis Buñuel Special Award at the 1990 Cannes Film Festival, and was nominated for the Best Foreign Language Film at the 63rd Academy Awards, becoming the first Chinese film to be nominated for an Academy Award for Best Foreign Language Film. Gong also won the Best Actress award at the Varna International Film Festival.

In 1991, Gong starred in Zhang Yimou's film Raise the Red Lantern, which won the Silver Lion award at the 48th Venice Film Festival, and was nominated for the Best Foreign Language Film at the 64th Academy Awards. Gong, playing a rebellious mistress in the film, won the Hundred Flowers Awards for Best Actress and was nominated for the David di Donatello Awards and the NSFC for Best Actress. Her performance in the Raise the Red Lantern (1991) put her in the international spotlight again.

In 1992, Gong starred in the rural drama The Story of Qiu Ju, which won the Golden Lion award at the 49th Venice International Film Festival. Gong's portrayal of rural woman Qiu Ju not only won the Golden Rooster Awards and the Japanese Movie Critics Awards for Best Actress, but also helped her named Best Actress at the 49th Venice Film Festival.

In 1993, she received a New York Film Critics Circle award for her role in Farewell My Concubine (1993). Directed by Chen Kaige, the film was her first major role with a director other than Zhang Yimou. In the same year, she was awarded with the Berlinale Camera at the 43rd Berlin International Film Festival. Premiere ranked her performance in Farewell My Concubine as the 89th greatest performance of all time. She also worked with renowned director Stephen Chow in comedy films God of Gamblers III: Back to Shanghai (1991) and Flirting Scholar (1993). Immune to political repercussions because of her fame, Gong Li began criticizing the censorship policy in China. Her films Farewell My Concubine and The Story of Qiu Ju were initially banned in China for being thinly veiled critiques of the Chinese government. Regarding the sexual content in Ju Dou, Chinese censorship deemed the film "a bad influence on the physical and spiritual health of young people."

In 1994, Gong played Jiazhen, the wife of Xu Fugui, in the drama To Live, which won the Grand Prix at the 1994 Cannes Film Festival. She was also nominated for the Chlotrudis Awards for Best Actress. In 1995, Gong starred in Shanghai Triad, during her breakup with Zhang Yimou, in which she played a seductive stage queen. The film won the Technical Grand Prize of Cannes Film Festival, the National Board of Review for Best Foreign Language film, and was nominated for the Golden Globe Award for Best Foreign Language Film.

These roles established her reputation, according to Asiaweek, as

"one of the world's most glamorous movie stars and an elegant throwback to Hollywood's golden era".

In 1996, Gong and Chen Kaige collaborated again in the romantic film Temptress Moon, which was in competition for the Palme d'Or at the 1996 Cannes Film Festival. Gong has been nominated for her second best Actress at the Hong Kong Film Awards for her role as rebellious teenage girl Ru Yi. She also appeared on the cover of Time. In 1997, Gong worked with Jeremy Irons on the romantic drama Chinese Box, which won the Best Original Music award at the Venice Film Festival. In the same year, Gong was invited to be a jury at the 1997 Cannes Film Festival, becoming the first Chinese to be a jury at the festival. In June 1998, Gong Li became a recipient of France's Ordre des Arts et des Lettres. In 1999, Gong and Chen Kaige collaborated for the third film The Emperor and the Assassin, which won the Technical Grand Prize at the 1999 Cannes Film Festival. In many of her early movies, Gong represents a tragic victim and an abused soul (physically or emotionally), trying to release herself from an impossible maze of corruption, violence and suppression. In Raise the Red Lantern and Shanghai Triad, an additional tragic element is added to her being as she unintentionally becomes the executioner of new innocent victims, making her realize that she has assisted the dark cynical system.

=== 2000–2004: Worldwide recognition ===
In 2000, Gong won her second international Best Actress trophy for her performance as a struggling single mother in Breaking the Silence (2000) directed by Sun Zhou at the Montreal World Film Festival. She attended the Montreal World Film Festival that year, where she was awarded a special Grand Prix of the Americas for lifetime achievement for her outstanding achievement. In the same year, Gong was invited by the Berlin Film Festival to be the president of its international jury for the festival's 50th anniversary. Gong was nominated Goodwill Ambassador of the Food and Agriculture Organization of the United Nations (FAO) on 16 October 2000.

In 2002, Gong was invited to head the jury of the Venice Film Festival. In 2003, Gong served as the president of the jury of the 16th Tokyo International Film Festival, the first woman to do so. In the early 2000s, Gong also starred in two films directed by Wong Kar-wai, 2046 and Eros (both in 2004), which were seen as "an important opportunity to get rid of the influence of Zhang Yimou". She also attended the 2004 Cannes Film Festival, where she was awarded the Festival Trophy for her contributions to film industry.

=== 2005–2018: Hollywood and Chinese cinema ===
Despite her popularity, Gong avoided Hollywood for years, due to a lack of confidence in speaking English. She made her English speaking debut in 2005 when she starred as Hatsumomo in Memoirs of a Geisha. Her performance was met with generally positive reviews. Time's Richard Corliss to describe her as

"gloriously channeling Bette Davis"

Gong also won the National Board of Review for Best Supporting Actress for her role as Hatsumomo. Her other English-language roles to date included the Chinese Cuban Isabella of Miami Vice in 2006 and Lady Murasaki of Hannibal Rising in 2007. In all three films, she learned her English lines phonetically.

Through three English-language films, Gong has gradually established herself in Hollywood. Speaking of the Hollywood experience, Gong said it broadened her horizons, gave her a better idea of what she liked and allowed her to experiment with different acting styles.

In 2006, Gong worked again with Yimou for historical epic Curse of the Golden Flower, for which She won the best Actress at the 26th Hong Kong Film Awards. Time named her performance as the Empress as the seventh greatest performance of the year. In the same year, she was voted No.1 in the poll of "Most Beautiful Persons in China" held by The Beijing News.

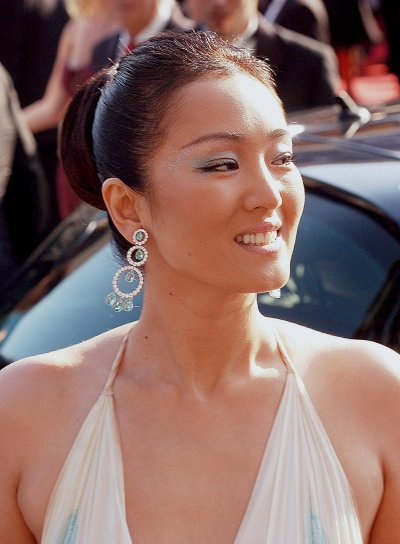
Gong Li at 2007 Cannes Film Festival.

She narrated Beijing (2008), an audio walking tour by Louis Vuitton and Soundwalk, which won an Audie Award for Best Original Work in 2009.

In 2010, Gong starred in the World War II-era thriller Shanghai as a spy who is disguised as the wife of a triad boss (played by Chow Yun-fat). She turned to documentaries and photographs about World War II, besides taking dancing classes three times a week, to ensure an accurate portrayal of the character. During a press junket for the film, she stated that she was becoming more selective with the Chinese language projects offered to her.

She also emphasized in the interview:

It takes time to create a good role, and it is not easy to meet a good role and one you like, so I am not in a hurry, nor need I be in such a hurry.

Shanghai was not a hit with critics, with critic Nick Allen writing that "Gong Li is put to a great amount of work as the most active member in the ensemble, but she has scant character aside from his intricate allegiances." That year, she was named by CNN as one of "Asia's 25 Greatest Actors of All Time."

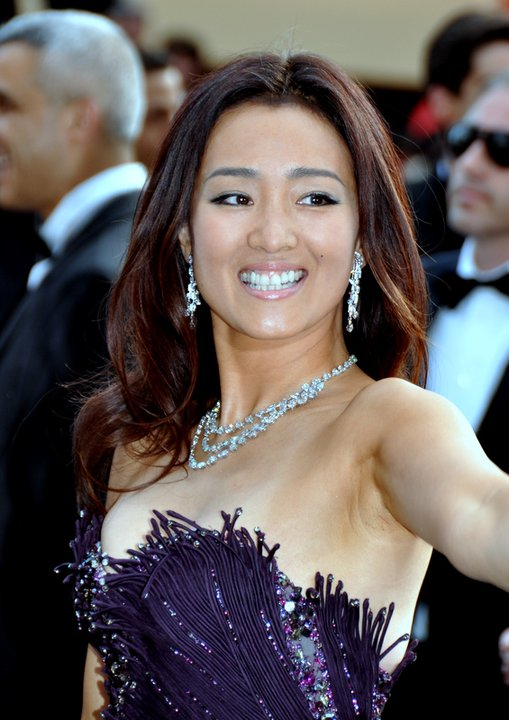
Gong at the 2011 Cannes Film Festival

In 2014, Gong was the president of the jury for the 17th Shanghai International Film Festival, becoming the first woman jury president in the festival's history. Later that same year, she reunited with Yimou for the film Coming Home, which is set during the throes of the Cultural Revolution; this film was their first collaboration since 2006. In 2016, Gong took on her first action role in The Monkey King 2, playing the White Bone Demon. In 2018, Gong served as the jury president of the 55th Golden Horse Awards.

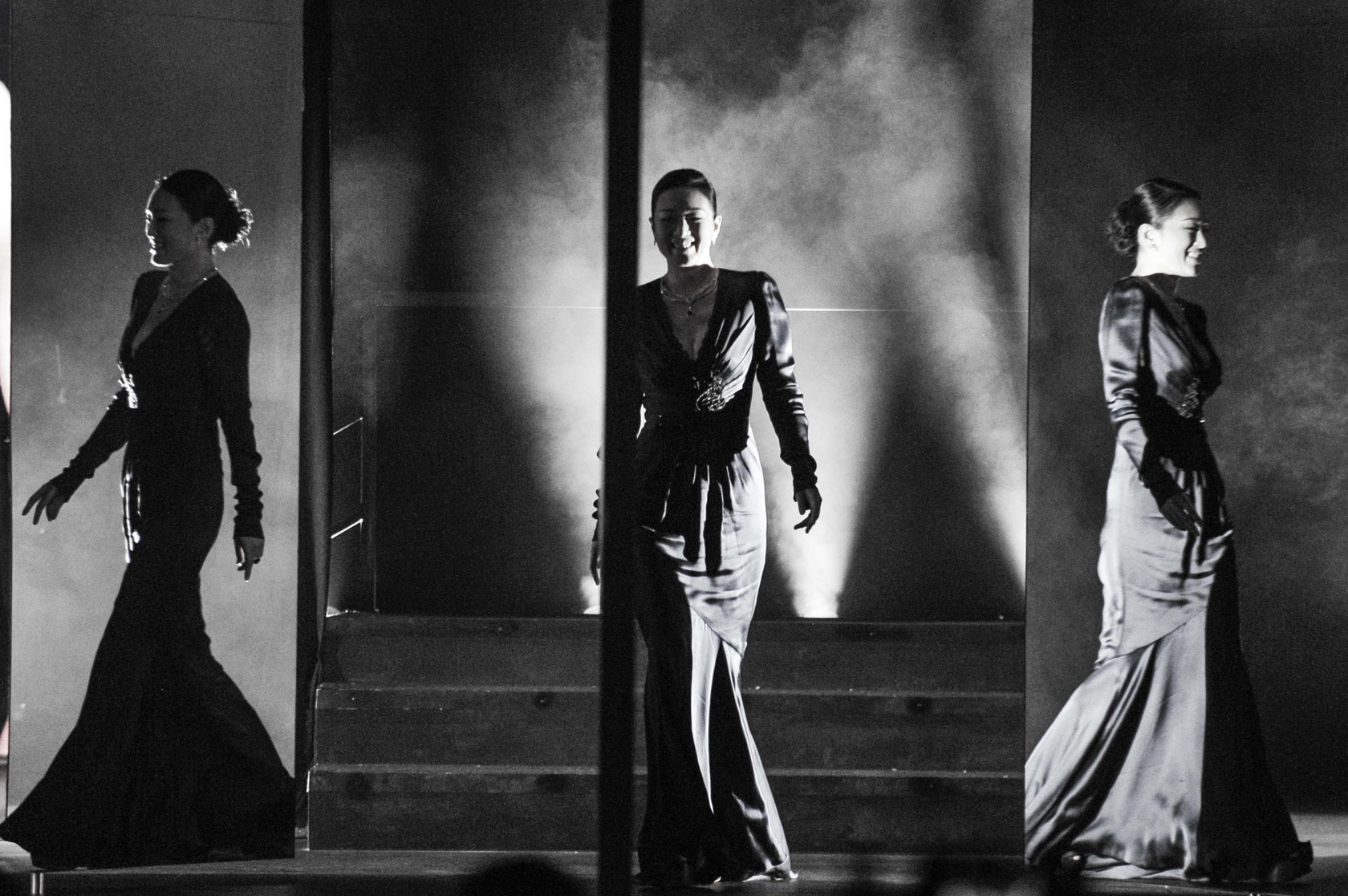
Gong in 2013

=== 2019–present ===
In 2019, Gong was cast in Lou Ye's period drama Saturday Fiction, where she plays an actress who is working undercover gathering intelligence for the Allies. The film was selected to compete for the Golden Lion at the 76th Venice International Film Festival. Gong learned shooting and hypnosis for the film. Saturday Fiction was a box office failure due to the delayed release, but the artistic value of the film and Gong's performance gained rave reviews. That year, she was also cast in the live-action adaptation of the 1998 Disney animated film Mulan, as a powerful witch. While the film, released in 2020, had a mixed reception, Gong's performance was widely praised by critics. Vanity Fair's chief critic, Richard Lawson, wrote in his review: "It is a pleasure as ever to watch Gong do her thing, slinking and thrashing around in a fabulous black witch's cloak."

The Hollywood Reporter commented:

the Chinese superstar marks her return to the spotlight with a pair of high-profile films: Lou Ye's period drama and Disney's live-action 'Mulan' remake.

In 2020, Gong was cast in Peter Chan's biographical film Leap, where she plays the hard-driving, real-life head coach of the Chinese women's national volleyball team Lang Ping. Leap grossed more than $100 million at the worldwide box office, and while the film received mixed reviews from critics, Gong's performance in the film was highly recognized. The performance swept all the major Hong Kong film industry awards in 2021, including the Hong Kong Film Critics Society Awards and the HKFDG Awards. She was also nominated for best actress at the Hong Kong Film Awards for the fourth time. The Hong Kong Film Critics Society described her performance as having an "astonishing aura" and wrote that "She fights with conviction in the face of a conservative educational establishment, former teammates and a new generation of young athletes."

In 2021, Gong was invited to be the jury president of the 11th Beijing International Film Festival, becoming the first female jury president in the festival's history. In 2022, Gong was invited to serve as the Art Chairman of the 12th Beijing Film Festival, responsible for the selected films, assisting in the invitation and recommendation of outstanding films and guests.

== Personal life ==
=== Relationships ===
Gong's personal and professional relationship with director Zhang Yimou has been highly publicised. Their relationship started in 1986 on the set of Red Sorghum, when Zhang was married to his first wife Xiao Hua while Gong was in another relationship. Gong's then-boyfriend was a classmate named Yang Jianxun, who had reportedly assaulted her after learning that, while acting in Red Sorghum, she worked predominantly with men. Gong Li also told Zhang that her boyfriend attacked her after finding out about their relationship. In 1988, Zhang divorced Xiao for Gong.

In 1995, soon after shooting Shanghai Triad, their seventh collaboration during their relationship, Zhang announced their break-up amidst rumors of Gong's affair with Singaporean businessman Ooi Hoe Seong, then managing director of British American Tobacco in China. According to Gong's mother, however, they split due to Zhang's reluctance to marry Gong after their nine-year relationship. After their break-up, Zhang invited Gong to star in his films Hero and House of Flying Daggers, but she declined both. They reunited in 2006 for the film Curse of the Golden Flower and in 2014 for Coming Home.

In November 1996, Gong married Ooi Hoe Seong at Hong Kong's China Club. The marriage was plagued by persistent rumors of discord. In early 2008, Gong applied for Singapore citizenship. When overseas professional obligations prevented her from showing up at her scheduled August citizenship ceremony, she was harshly criticized for not making it a priority. On Saturday 8 November 2008, in an effort to make amends, Gong attended a citizenship ceremony held at Teck Ghee Community Club and received her Singapore citizenship certificate from Member of Parliament Lee Bee Wah.

Gong was reportedly considering renouncing her Singaporean citizenship after China blacklisted celebrities with foreign passports, but there is no evidence that she went through with the renunciation. In 2009, Gong and Ooi quietly divorced, though they did not make the news public until three years later.

In 2006, Gong began a relationship with a French photographer, whom she met on the Prague set of Hannibal Rising. The relationship lasted for over eight years.

In 2016, Gong started dating the French composer and musician Jean-Michel Jarre. They married in 2019.

== Filmography ==
=== Films ===
Year	Title	Role	Notes	Ref.
1987	Red Sorghum	Jiu'er		
1989	The Empress Dowager 西太后	Guilian		
1989	Code Name: Cugar	Ah Li		
1989	A Terracotta Warrior	Winter/Lili Chu		
1990	Ju Dou	Ju Dou		
1991	God of Gamblers III: Back to Shanghai	Yu-Sin/Yu-Mong		
1991	Raise the Red Lantern	Songlian		
1991	The Banquet	Herself/Waitress at banquet		
1992	The Story of Qiu Ju	Qiu Ju		
1992	Mary from Beijing	Mary		
1993	Farewell My Concubine	Juxian		
1993	Flirting Scholar	Chou Heung		
1994	Dragon Chronicles: The Maidens of Heavenly Mountain	Mo Han-Wen		
1994	A Soul Haunted by Painting	Pan Yuliang		
1994	To Live	Jiazhen		
1994	The Great Conqueror's Concubine	Lü Zhi		
1995	Shanghai Triad	Xiao Jinbao		
1996	Temptress Moon	Pan Ruyi		
1997	Chinese Box	Vivian		
1998	The Emperor and the Assassin	Lady Zhao		
2000	Breaking the Silence	Sun Liying		
2002	Zhou Yu's Train	Zhou Yu		
2004	2046	Su Li Zhen		
2004	Eros: The Hand	Miss Hua		
2005	Memoirs of a Geisha	Hatsumomo		
2006	Miami Vice	Isabella		
2006	Curse of the Golden Flower	Empress Phoenix		
2007	Hannibal Rising	Lady Murasaki Shikibu Lecter		
2010	Shanghai	Anna Lan-Ting		
2011	What Women Want	Li Yilong		
2014	Coming Home	Feng Wanyu		
2016	The Monkey King 2	White Bone Demon		
2019	Saturday Fiction	Yu Jin		
2020	Mulan	Xianniang		
2020	Leap	Lang Ping		

=== Dubbing ===
Year	Title	Director
2007	My Blueberry Nights	Wong Kar-wai

=== Talk shows ===
Year	English title	Host
1989	Celebrity Talk Show 今夜不设防	James Wong Jim, Ni Kuang, Chua Lam
2003	Starface 名人面对面	许戈辉
2009	YANG LAN ONE ON ONE 杨澜访谈录	Yang Lan
2011	Star show 巨星秀	Zhang Yi
2013	Telling Maria 2 最佳女主角	黎芷珊
2014	YANG LAN ONE ON ONE 杨澜访谈录	Yang Lan

=== Music video appearances ===
Year	Song title
1987	"Don't Come at Dawn" (黎明不要来)
2001	"New Beijing, Great Olympics" (新北京，新奥运)

== Discography ==
Year	Song title	Notes
1994	"Hate this Life" (恨今生)	The Great Conqueror's Concubine OST
1995	"Shanghai Triad" (摇啊摇，摇到外婆桥)	Shanghai Triad OST
1995	"Get Out of Here" (滚出去)	Shanghai Triad OST
1995	"Take a Full Moon" (月圆花好)	Shanghai Triad OST
1995	"Special Express" (特别快车)	Shanghai Triad OST
1995	"The Prudish" (假正经)	Shanghai Triad OST
2001	"New Beijing, Great Olympics" (新北京，新奥运)	with Jackie Chan, Coco Lee

== Endorsements ==
Gong is the first Chinese ambassador for L'Oreal Paris in 1997. She also served as ambassador for Midea and Osim International. From 2013 to 2018, Gong served as the global ambassadors for Piaget. Gong was announced as the global brand ambassador for Hisense on September 27, 2020. Since 2021, Gong has been the first Chinese artist to become the global high jewelry ambassador for Cartier.

== Charities ==
- Gong was appointed UNESCO Artist for Peace in 2000.
- Gong was appointed FAO Goodwill Ambassador on World Food Day 2000. "To launch an appeal against hunger is not a waste of time.
- Gong has been invited by the United Nations Environment Program (UNEP) to be Global Environmental Ambassador, and to urge the public to give up bad habits that are harmful to the environment and to reduce the discharge of carbon dioxide in 2008.
- Gong's portrait on display at "The Transformative Power of Art" Exhibition, at the United Nations headquarters in 2016.

== Awards and nominations ==
Year	Award	Category	Nominated work	Result	Ref.
1989	Hundred Flowers Award	Best Supporting Actress	Code Name: Cugar	Won	
1991	Hong Kong Film Awards	Best Actress	A Terracotta Warrior	Nominated	
1992	Venice Film Festival	Volpi Cup for Best Actress	The Story of Qiu Ju	Won	
1992	Venice Film Festival	Golden Ciak – Best Actress	The Story of Qiu Ju	Won	
1993	Golden Rooster Awards	Best Actress	The Story of Qiu Ju	Won	
1993	Golden Phoenix Awards	Society Award	The Story of Qiu Ju	Won	
1993	Japanese Movie Critics Awards	Best Actress	The Story of Qiu Ju	Won	
1993	Hundred Flowers Awards	Best Actress	The Story of Qiu Ju	Nominated	
1993	New York Film Critics Circle Award	Best Supporting Actress	Farewell My Concubine	Won	
1993	Berlin International Film Festival	Berlinale Camera	—N/a	Honored	
1993	Hundred Flowers Awards	Best Actress	Raise the Red Lantern	Won	
1993	National Society of Film Critics	Best Actress	Raise the Red Lantern	3rd place	
1993	Varna 'Love Is Folly' International Film Festival	Best Actress	Ju Dou	Won	
1994	Chlotrudis Awards	Best Actress	To Live	Nominated	
1996	David di Donatello Awards	Best Foreign Actress	Raise the Red Lantern	Nominated	
1997	Hong Kong Film Award	Best Actress	Temptress Moon	Nominated	
1998	Ordre des Arts et des Lettres	Officier (Officer)	—N/a	Honored	
2000	Montreal World Film Festival	Grand Prix des Amériques	—N/a	Honored	
2000	Golden Rooster Awards	Best Actress	Breaking the Silence	Won	
2000	Montreal World Film Festival	Best Actress	Breaking the Silence	Won	
2001	Hundred Flowers Awards	Best Actress	Breaking the Silence	Won	
2001	Shanghai Film Critics Awards	Best Actress	Breaking the Silence	Won	
2001	Golden Phoenix Awards	Society Award	Breaking the Silence	Won	
2001	Hundred Flowers Awards	Most Popular Actress	—N/a	Honored	
2003	Beijing College Student Film Festival	Favorite Actress	Zhou Yu's Train	Won	
2004	Chinese Film Media Awards	Best Actress	Zhou Yu's Train	Nominated	
2004	Cannes Film Festival	Festival Trophy	—N/a	Honored	
2005	National Board of Review	Best Supporting Actress	Memoirs of a Geisha	Won	
2005	Satellite Award	Best Supporting Actress – Motion Picture	Memoirs of a Geisha	Nominated	
2007	Hong Kong Film Award	Best Actress	Curse of the Golden Flower	Won	
2007	Hong Kong Film Critics Society Award	Best Actress	Curse of the Golden Flower	Won	
2007	Asian Film Awards	Best Actress	Curse of the Golden Flower	Nominated	
2007	Golden Bauhinia Awards	Best Actress	Curse of the Golden Flower	Won	
2007	Chinese Film Media Awards	Best Actress	Curse of the Golden Flower	Nominated	
2008	Italian Online Movie Awards	Best Actress	Curse of the Golden Flower	Nominated	
2010	Ordre des Arts et des Lettres	Commandeur (Commander)	—N/a	Honored	
2014	FIRST International Film Festival	Most watched actress	Coming Home	Won	
2014	Shanghai Film Critics Awards	Best Actress	Coming Home	Won	
2014	Golden Deer Awards	Best Actress	Coming Home	Won	
2014	Golden Horse Awards	Best Actress	Coming Home	Nominated	
2014	Macau International Movie Festival	Best Actress	Coming Home	Nominated	
2015	Asian Film Awards	Best Actress	Coming Home	Nominated	
2015	China Film Directors' Guild Awards	Best Actress	Coming Home	Won	
2015	Chinese Film Media Awards	Best Actress	Coming Home	Nominated	
2016	Huabiao Awards	Outstanding Actress	Coming Home	Nominated	
2016	China Britain Film Festival	Best Actress	The Monkey King 2	Won	
2017	Top Ten Chinese Films Festival	Best Actress	The Monkey King 2	Nominated	
2019	Cannes Film Festival	Women in Motion Award (Note: Presented by Kering and Cannes Film Festival)	—N/a	Honored	
2020	Hong Kong Film Critics Society Award	Best Actress	Leap	Won	
2021	Huading Awards	Best Actress	Leap	Won	
2021	Hong Kong Film Directors' Guild Awards	Best Actress	Leap	Won	
2021	China Film Director's Guild Awards	Best Actress	Leap	Won	
2022	Hong Kong Film Awards	Best Actress	Leap	Nominated	
2022	China Film Director's Guild Awards	Best Actress	Saturday Fiction	Nominated	

=== Jury ===
- 1997 – 50th Cannes Film Festival
- 2000 – 50th Berlin International Film Festival
- 2002 – 59th Venice International Film Festival
- 2003 – 16th Tokyo International Film Festival
- 2014 – 17th Shanghai International Film Festival
- 2018 – 55th Golden Horse Film Festival and Awards
- 2021 – 11th Beijing International Film Festival

== See also ==
- Cinema of China
