= 2012 Nobel Prize in Literature =

- Mo Yan
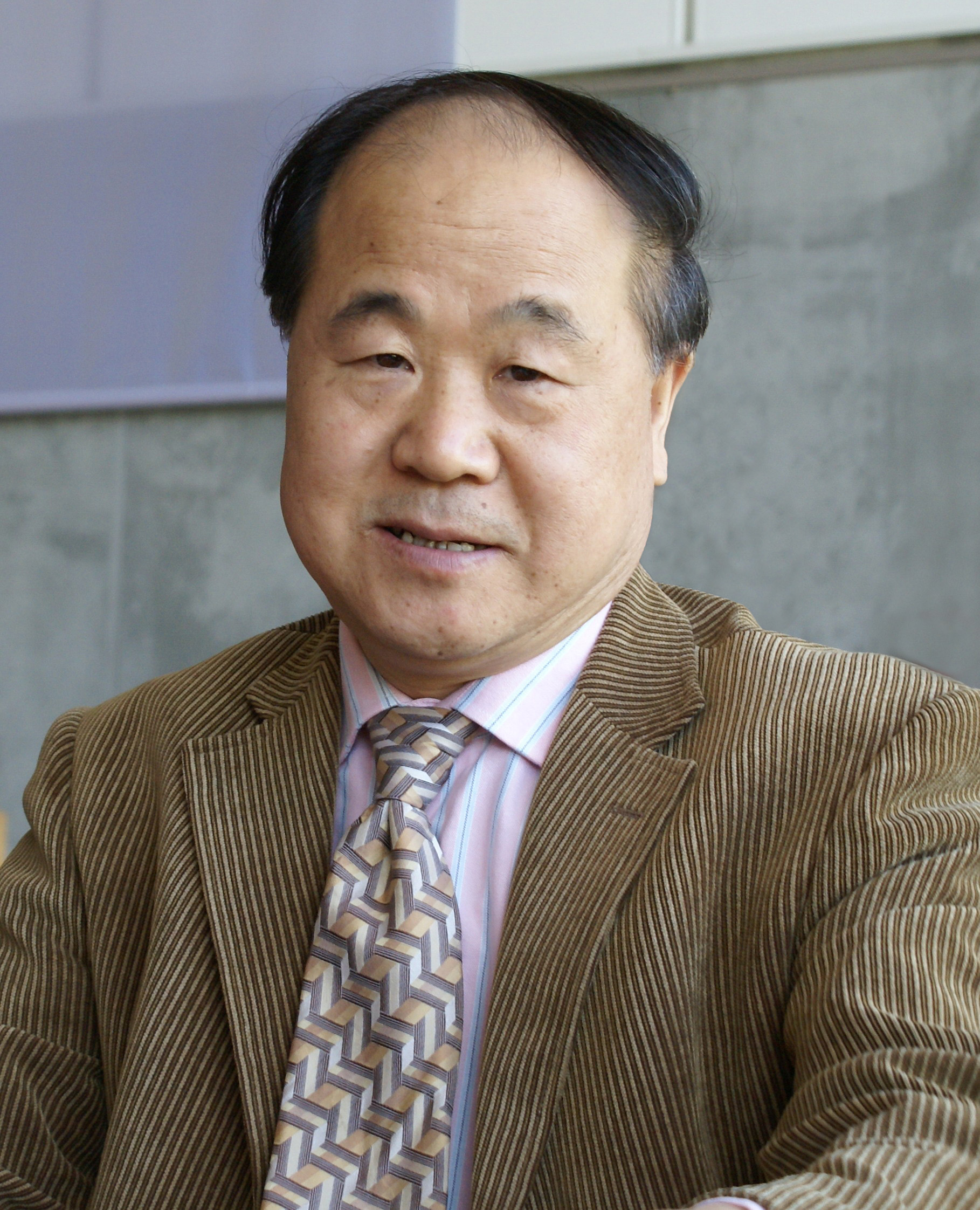
- "who with hallucinatory realism merges folk tales, history and the contemporary."
- Date: 11 October 2012 (announcement); 10 December 2012 (ceremony)
- Location: Stockholm, Sweden
- Presented by: Swedish Academy
- First award: 1901
- Website: Official website

The 2012 Nobel Prize in Literature was awarded to the Chinese writer Mo Yan (born 1955) "who with hallucinatory realism merges folk tales, history and the contemporary." He is the second Chinese author to win the prize after the exiled Gao Xingjian.

== Laureate ==
Mo Yan's writings cover a wide span from short stories, to novels and essays. His earlier works such as Bái gǒu qiūqiān jià ("White Dog and the Swing", 1981–1989) – were written according to the prevailing literary dictates of the ruling regime. Over time, however, his storytelling began to seek out its own, more independent paths. His works include Hóng gāoliang jiāzú ("Red Sorghum", 1986), Tiantàng suàntái zhī gē ("The Garlic Ballads", 1988) and Shéngsi píláo ("Life and Death are Wearing Me Out", 2006). His narrative style bears the hallmarks of magical realism and often use older Chinese literature and popular oral traditions as a starting point, combining these with contemporary social issues. Among his other famous literary works include Shí cǎo jiāzú ("The Herbivorous Family", 1993) and Fēng rǔ féi tún ("Big Breasts & Wide Hips", 1995).

== Candidates ==
On Ladbrokes, Japanese novelist Haruki Murakami and Hungarian author Péter Nádas were the favourites to win the 2012 Nobel Prize in Literature, followed by Irish author William Trevor, Canadian Alice Munro (awarded the 2013 Nobel Prize in Literature) and Mo Yan at a 9/1 odds. Other favourites included Albanian Ismail Kadare, Americans Philip Roth and Cormac McCarthy, Dutch Cees Nooteboom, Israeli Amos Oz, Italian Dacia Maraini, Korean Ko Un and Syrian Adonis.

== Reactions ==
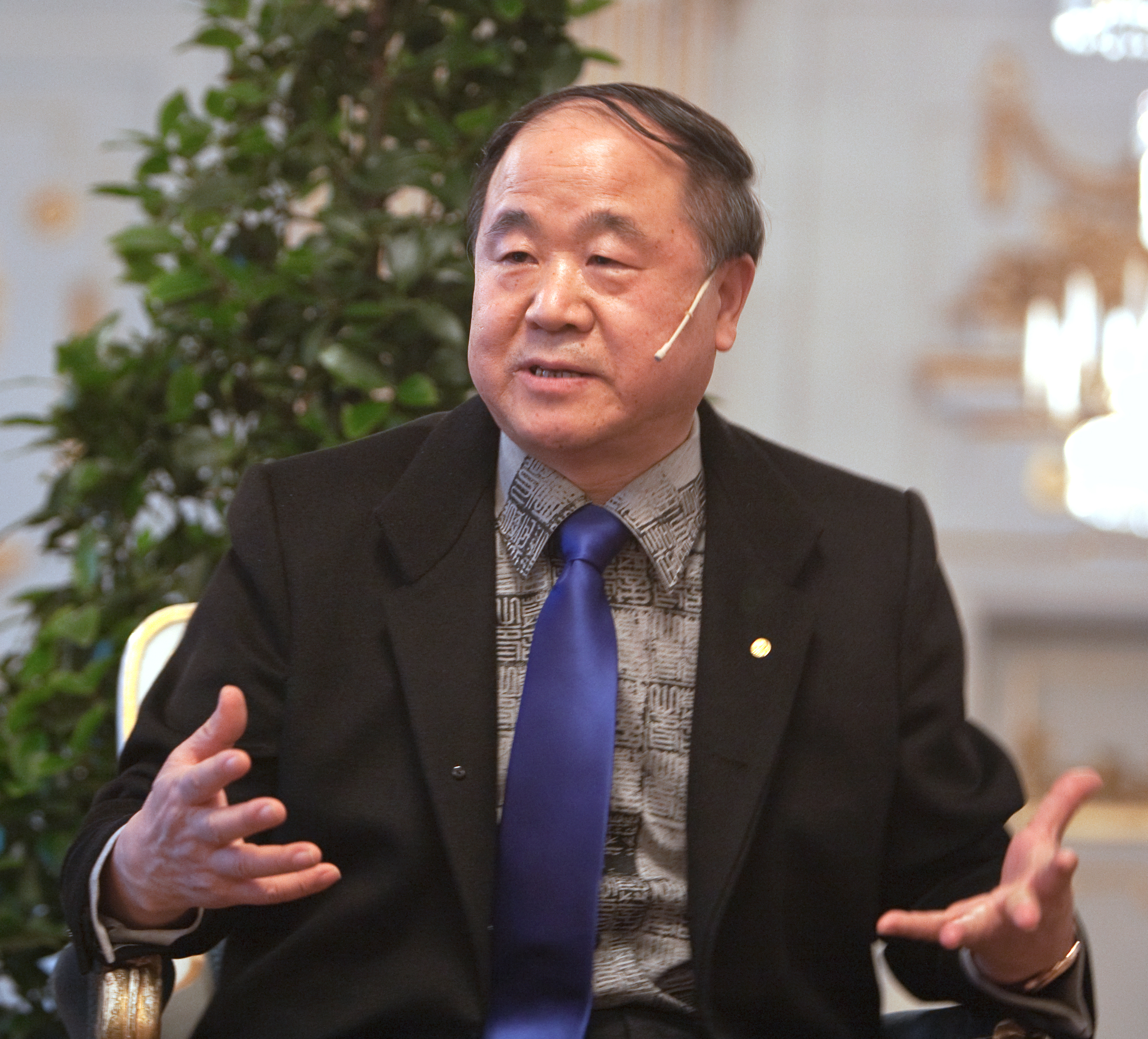
Mo Yan in Stockholm to receive the Nobel Prize in Literature 2012

Aged 57 at the time of the announcement, he was the 109th recipient of the award and the first ever resident of mainland China to receive it. In his Award Ceremony Speech, Per Wästberg explained: "Mo Yan is a poet who tears down stereotypical propaganda posters, elevating the individual from an anonymous human mass. Using ridicule and sarcasm Mo Yan attacks history and its falsifications as well as deprivation and political hypocrisy."

Swedish Academy's permanent secretary Peter Englund said less formally, "He has such a damn unique way of writing. If you read half a page of Mo Yan you immediately recognize it as him". During a seminar on Mo Yan at Beijing Normal University in April 2011, executive director of CLT and WLT, revealed that he had proposed Mo Yan for the 2012 Nobel Prize in Literature. Davis address that, given Mo Yan's fame and production, his work should serve as the best ground in quality and depth of modern Chinese literature for Westerners.

== Controversies and criticism ==
Winning the Nobel Prize occasioned both support and criticism. Firstly, it won warm welcome from the Chinese government immediately after the announcement of the Nobel Prize. The People's Daily Online, the official newspaper of the Chinese Communist Party, published on 11 October 2012: "Congratulations to Mo Yan for winning the Nobel Prize in Literature! It is the first time for a writer of Chinese nationality to win the Nobel Prize in Literature. Today is the day that Chinese writers have awaited for too long and that Chinese people have awaited for too long."

The Chinese writer Ma Jian deplored Mo Yan's lack of solidarity and commitment to other Chinese writers and intellectuals who were punished or detained in violation of their constitutionally protected freedom of expression. Several other Chinese dissidents such as Ye Du and Ai Weiwei also criticized him, as did 2009 Nobel Laureate Herta Müller who called the decision a "catastrophe". A specific criticism was that Mo hand-copied Mao Zedong's influential Yan'an Talks on Literature and Art in commemoration of the 70th anniversary of the speech, which described the writer's responsibility to place politics before art. These "Talks"—which were the intellectual handcuffs of Chinese writers throughout the Mao era and were almost universally reviled by writers during the years between Mao's death in 1976 and the 1989 Tiananmen Square protests and massacre—were now again being held up for adulation. Mo Yan not only agreed but has gone further than others to explain that the "Talks," in their time, had "historical necessity" and "played a positive role." He has also attracted criticism for his supposed good relationship with the Chinese Communist Party in general.

Mo Yan released a publication by the name of Big Breasts and Wide Hips that caught criticism and came under fire for its sexual content and how it portrayed the Communist Party in early 20th century China. Due to the abundance of negative feedback from the community, Mo Yan was forced to withdraw this short story from publication.

Anna Sun, an assistant professor of Sociology and Asian studies at Kenyon College, criticized Mo's writing as coarse, predictable, and lacking in aesthetic conviction. "Mo Yan's language is striking indeed," she writes, but it is striking because "it is diseased. The disease is caused by the conscious renunciation of China's cultural past at the founding of the People's Republic of China in 1949." Charles Laughlin of the University of Virginia, however, accuses Sun of "piling up aesthetic objections to conceal ideological conflict," comparing her characterization of Mo to the official China Writers Association's characterization of Gao Xingjian as a mediocre writer when Gao won the Nobel Prize in 2000.

Perry Link, describing Mo Yan's fiction and politics in the New York Review of Books, asked, "Does this writer deserve the prize?" Link commented that Chinese writers, whether "inside the system" or not, "all must choose how they will relate to their country's authoritarian government." This "inevitably involves calculations, trade-offs, and the playing of cards in various ways." Link's main criticism was that Mo Yan "invoke(d) a kind of daft hilarity when treating 'sensitive' events" such as the Great Chinese Famine and the Cultural Revolution. Link believed that the regime approved it because "this mode of writing is useful not just because it diverts a square look at history but because of its function as a safety valve." As Link pointed out, to treat sensitive topics as jokes might be better than banning them outright. Link compared Mo to Liu Xiaobo, winner of the 2010 Nobel Peace Prize, who was jailed for dissidence, whose moral choices were "highly unusual." It would be wrong, Link concludes, "for spectators like you and me, who enjoy the comfort of distance, to demand that Mo Yan risk all and be another Liu Xiaobo. But it would be even more wrong to mistake the clear difference between the two."

Charles Laughlin, however, published an article called What Mo Yan's Detractors Get Wrong on ChinaFile against Link's argument. As a response to Link's criticism that Mo Yan trivialized serious historical tragedies by using black humor and what he called "daft hilarity", Laughlin emphasized the distinction between documentary and art and literature: "art and literature, particularly since the traumas of the twentieth century, never simply document experience." Laughlin argued that Mo Yan's intended readers already know that "the Great Leap Forward led to a catastrophic famine, and any artistic approach to historical trauma is inflected or refracted." According to him, "Mo Yan writes about the period he writes about because they were traumatic, not because they were hilarious."

Salman Rushdie called Mo Yan a "patsy" for refusing to sign a petition asking for Liu Xiaobo's freedom. Pankaj Mishra saw an "unexamined assumption" lurking in the "western scorn" for these choices, namely that "Anglo-American writers" were not criticized for similarly apolitical attitudes.

In a rare interview with German newspaper Der Spiegel, Mo Yan, using a translator said "I know he envies me for this award and I understand this. But his criticism is unjustified," about fellow Chinese writer and musician Liao Yiwu. He also stated that his major critics, "use magnifying glasses to look for my flaws and they even distort the meaning of my poems".

In his Nobel Lecture, Mo Yan himself commented, "At first I thought I was the target of the disputes, but over time I've come to realize that the real target was a person who had nothing to do with me. Like someone watching a play in a theater, I observed the performances around me. I saw the winner of the prize both garlanded with flowers and besieged by stone-throwers and mudslingers." He concluded that "for a writer, the best way to speak is by writing. You will find everything I need to say in my works. Speech is carried off by the wind; the written word can never be obliterated."

Following the awarding of the prize to Mo Yan in 2012, Göran Malmqvist, a member of the Swedish Academy, was criticized for a possible conflict of interest, as he had close personal and economic relations to Mo Yan. He had translated several of Mo Yan's works into Swedish and published some through his own publishing house. Mo Yan had also written a laudatory preface to one of Malmqvist's own books, and been a close friend of Malmqvist's wife for 15 years. The Nobel committee denied that this constituted a conflict of interest, and said that it would have been absurd for Malmqvist to recuse.

== Gallery ==
- 11 October 2012: Permanent secretary Peter Englund's announcement of the 2012 Nobel Prize laureate in Literature
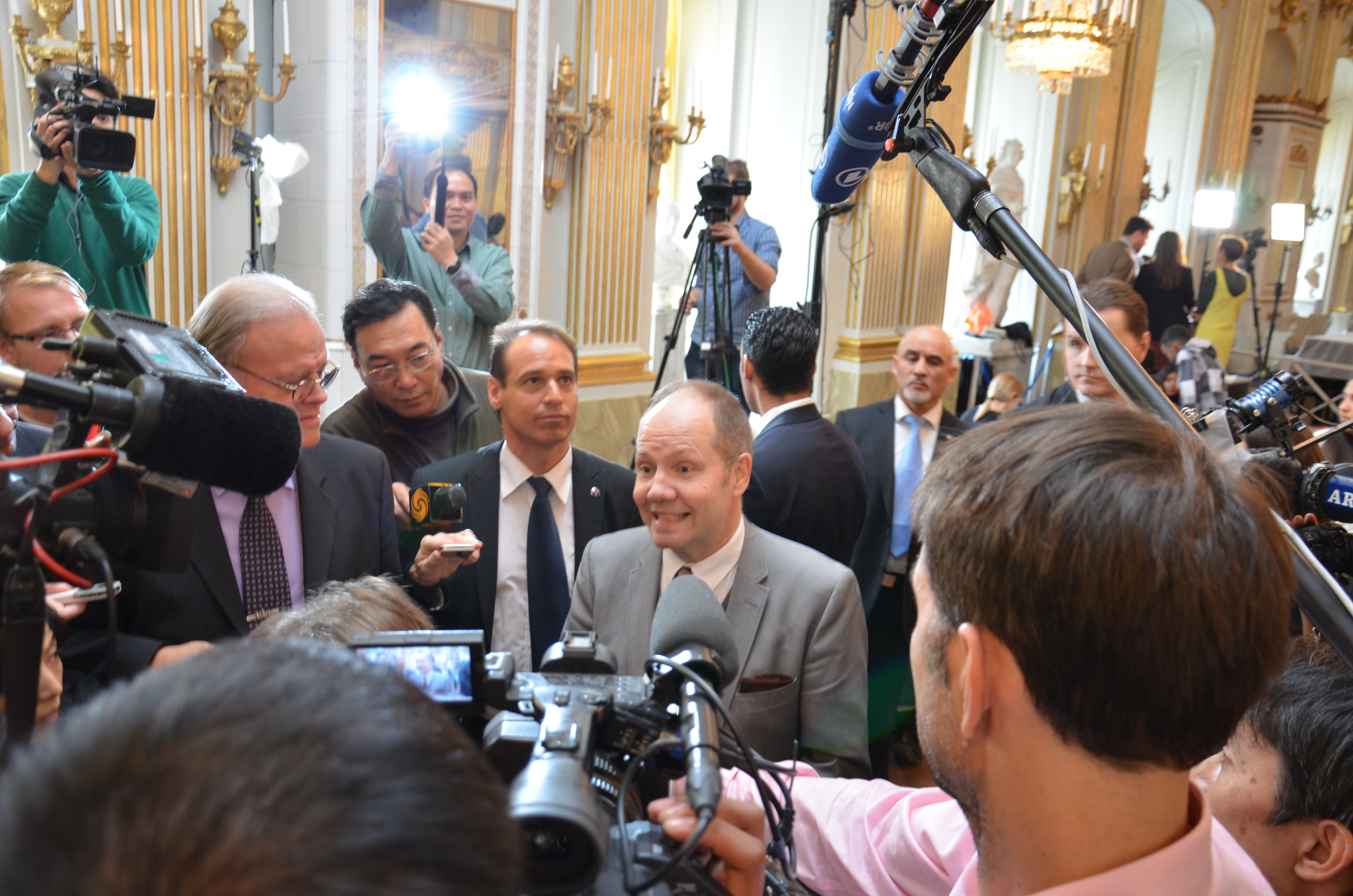

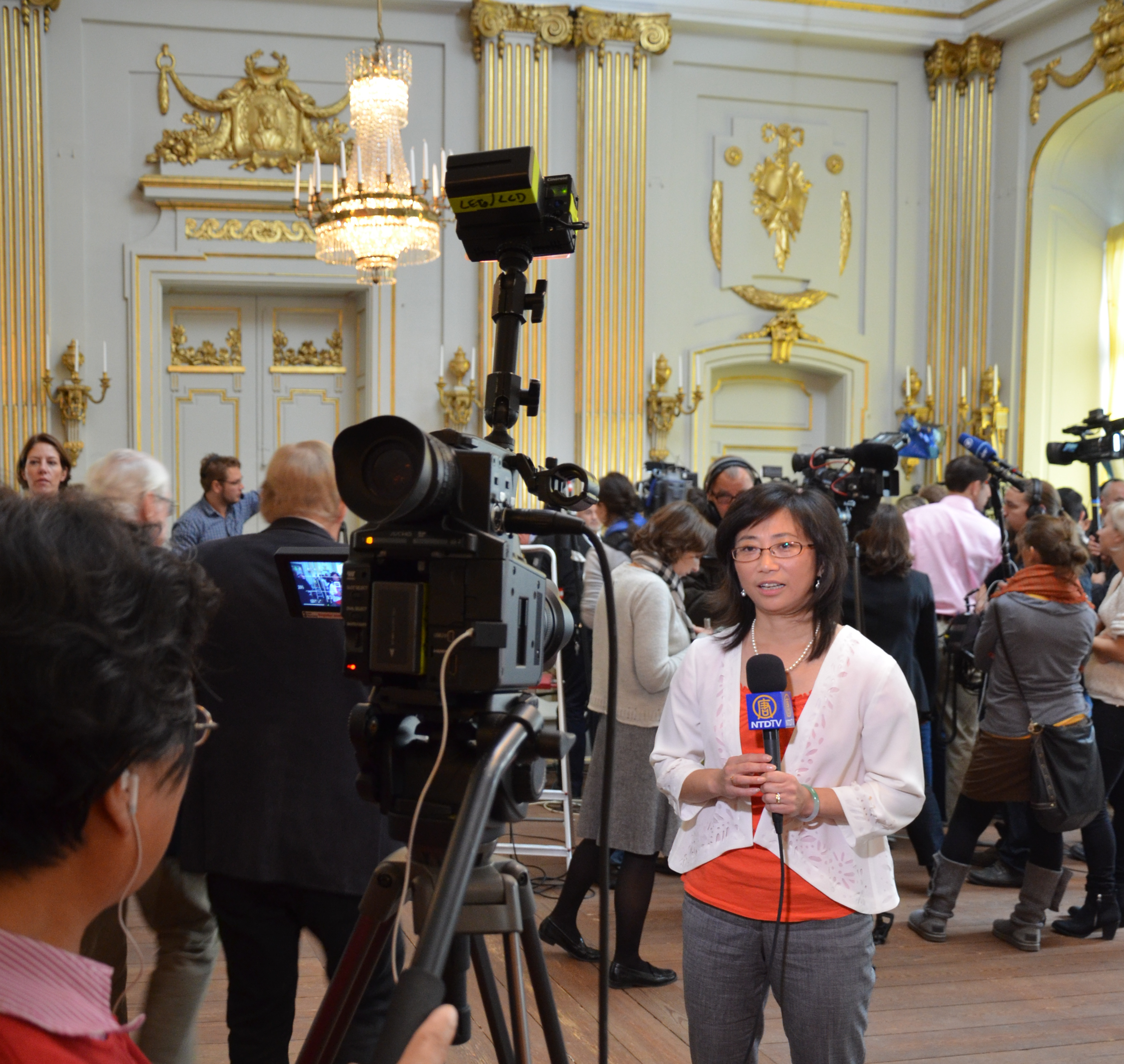

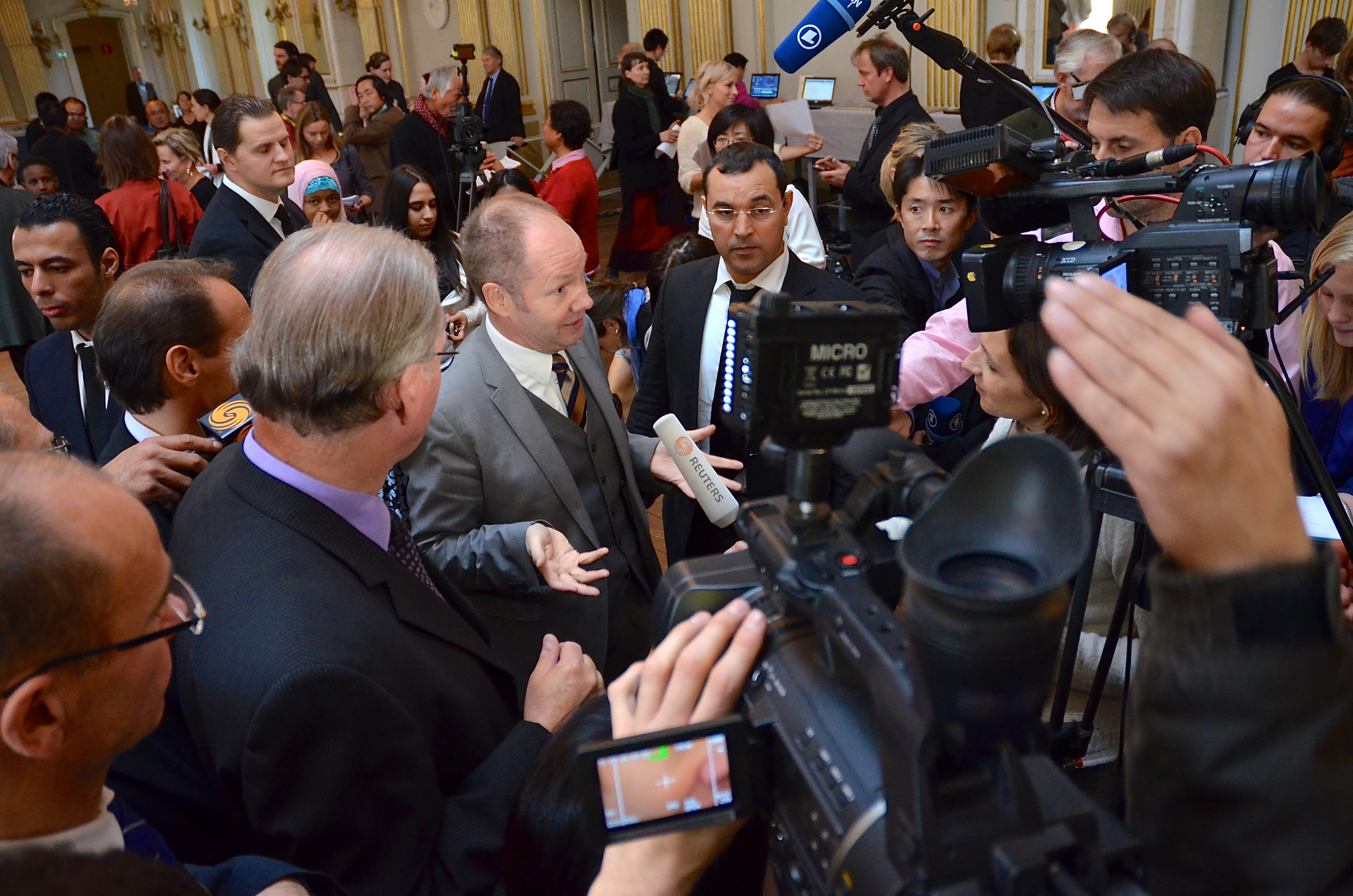

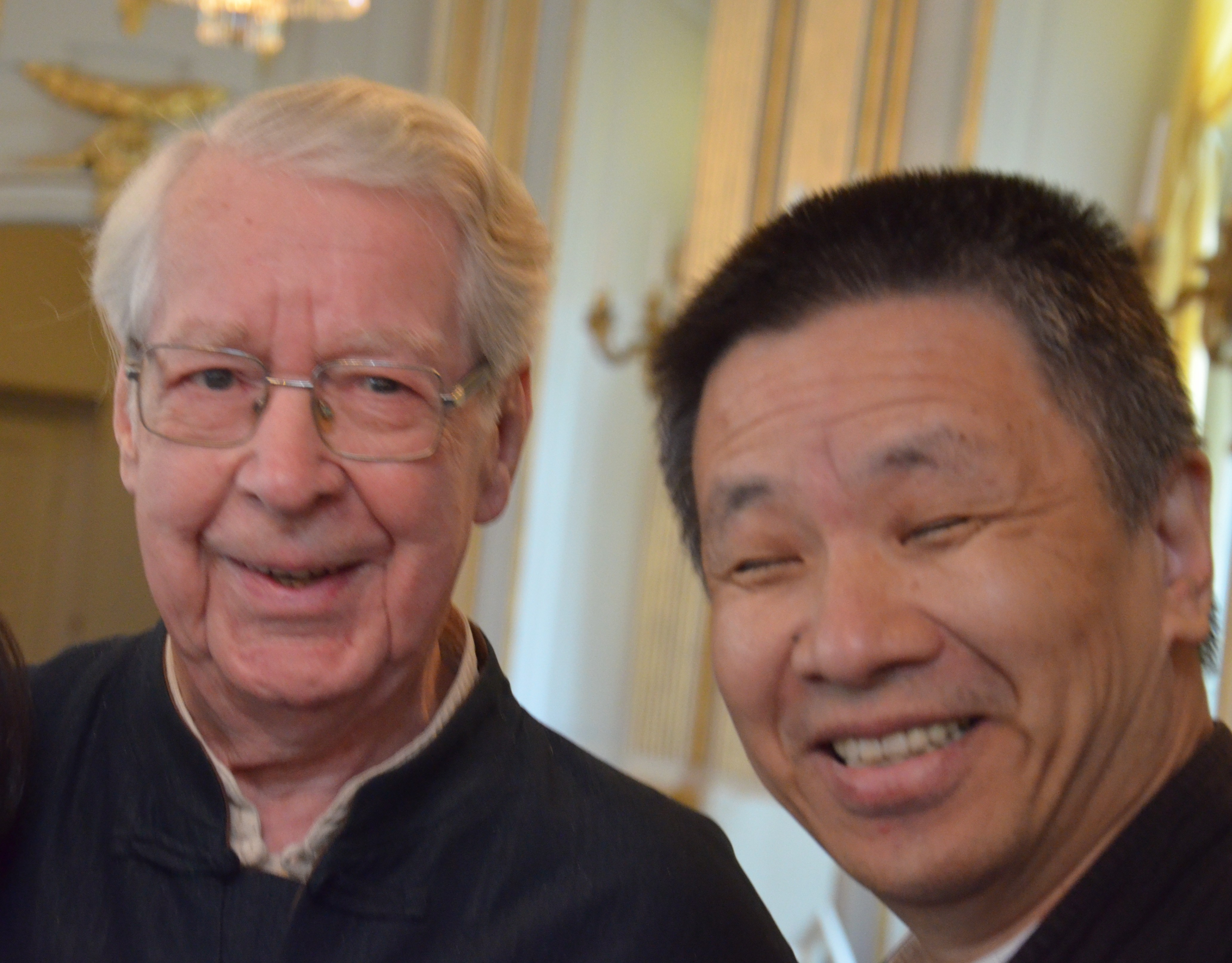

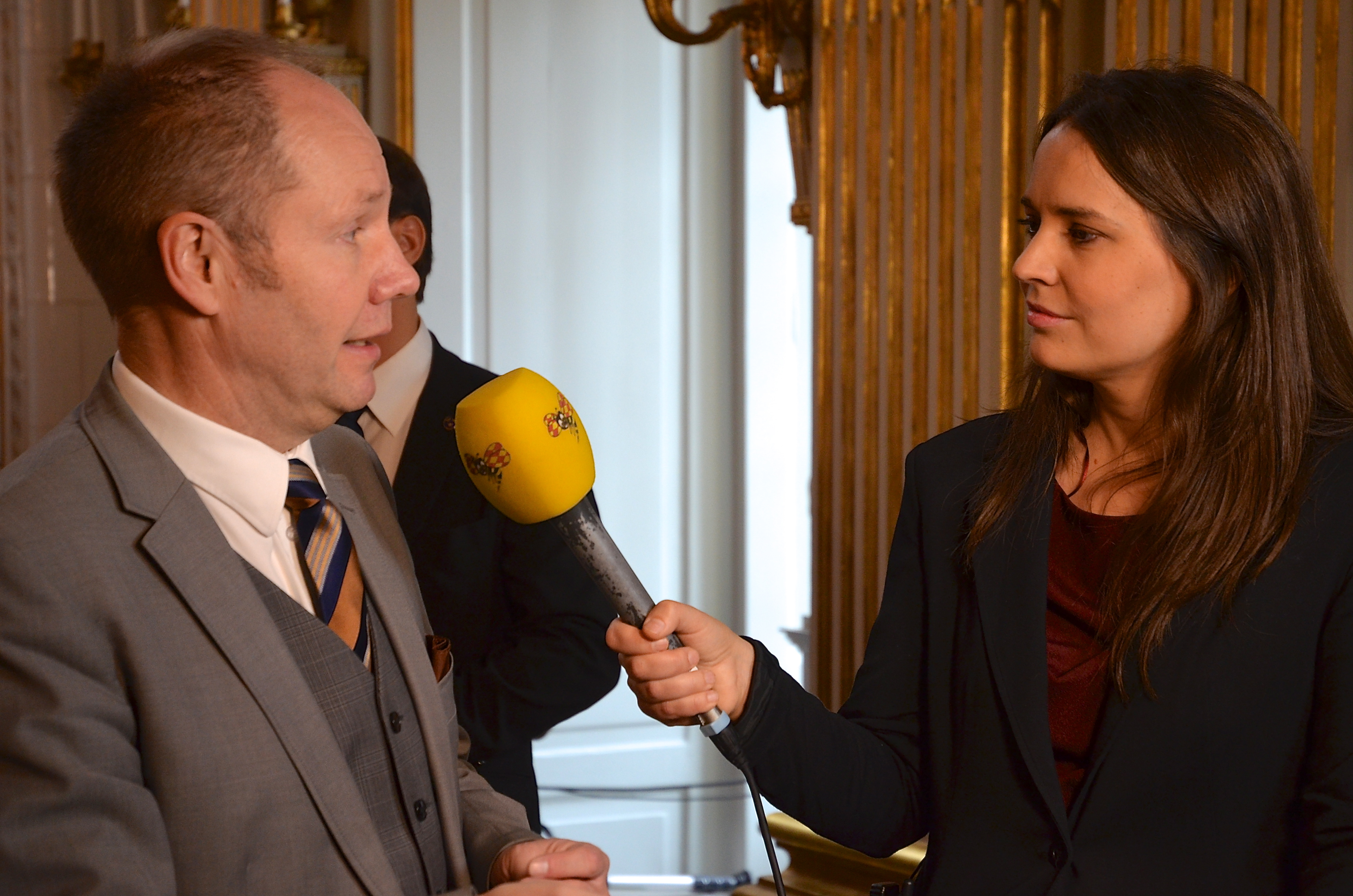
- 6 December 2012: Nobel laureate Mo Yan during the academy's press conference.
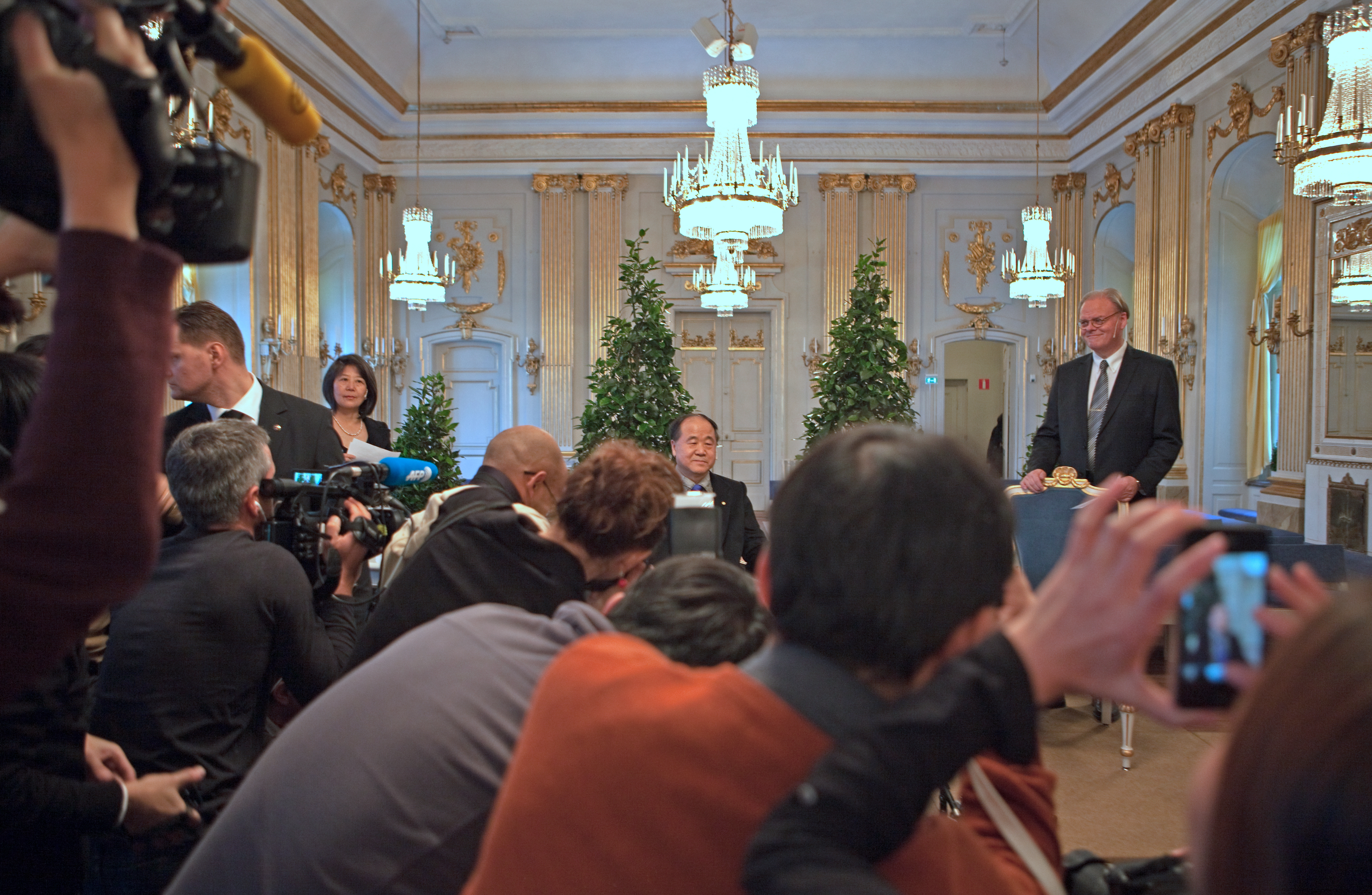

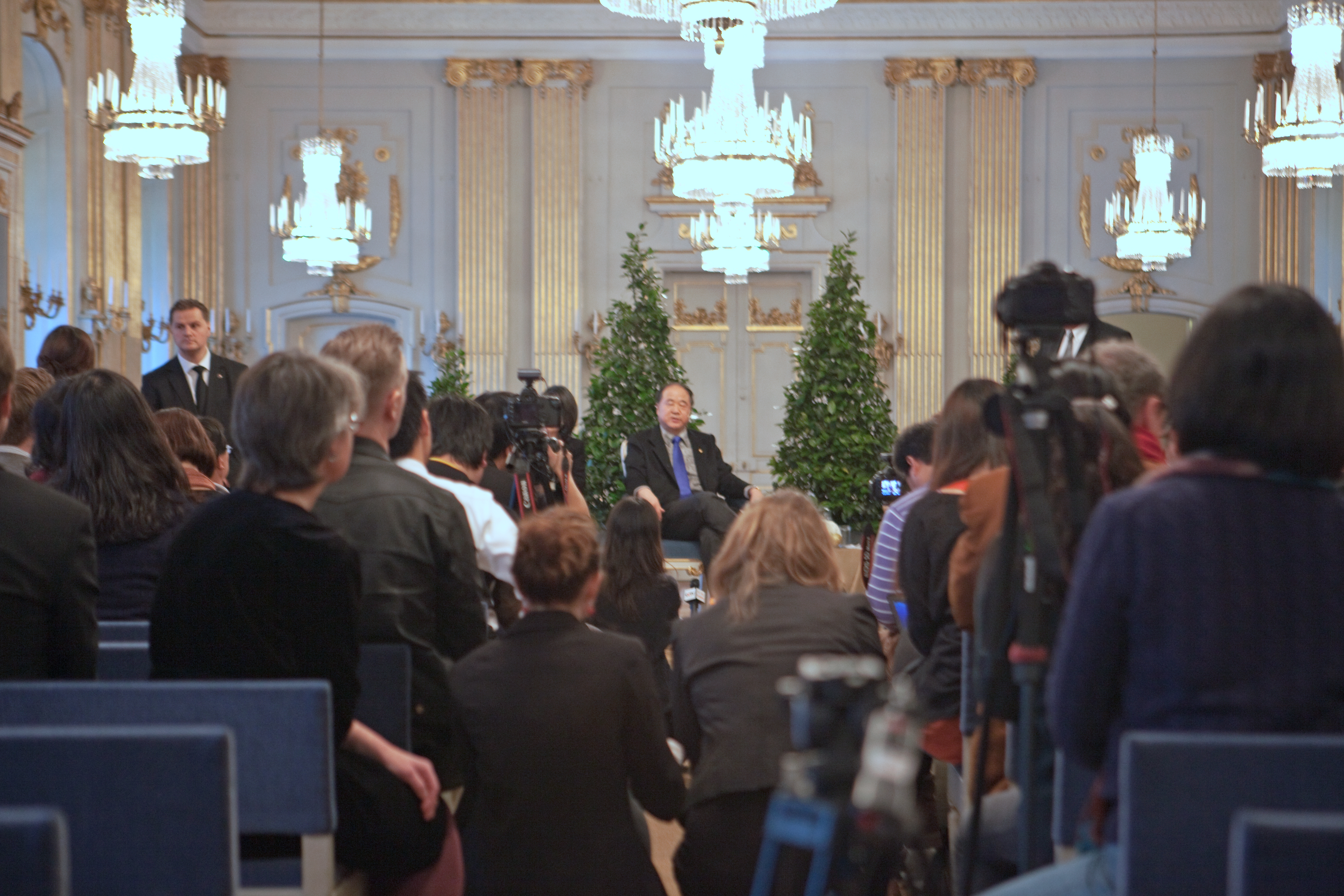

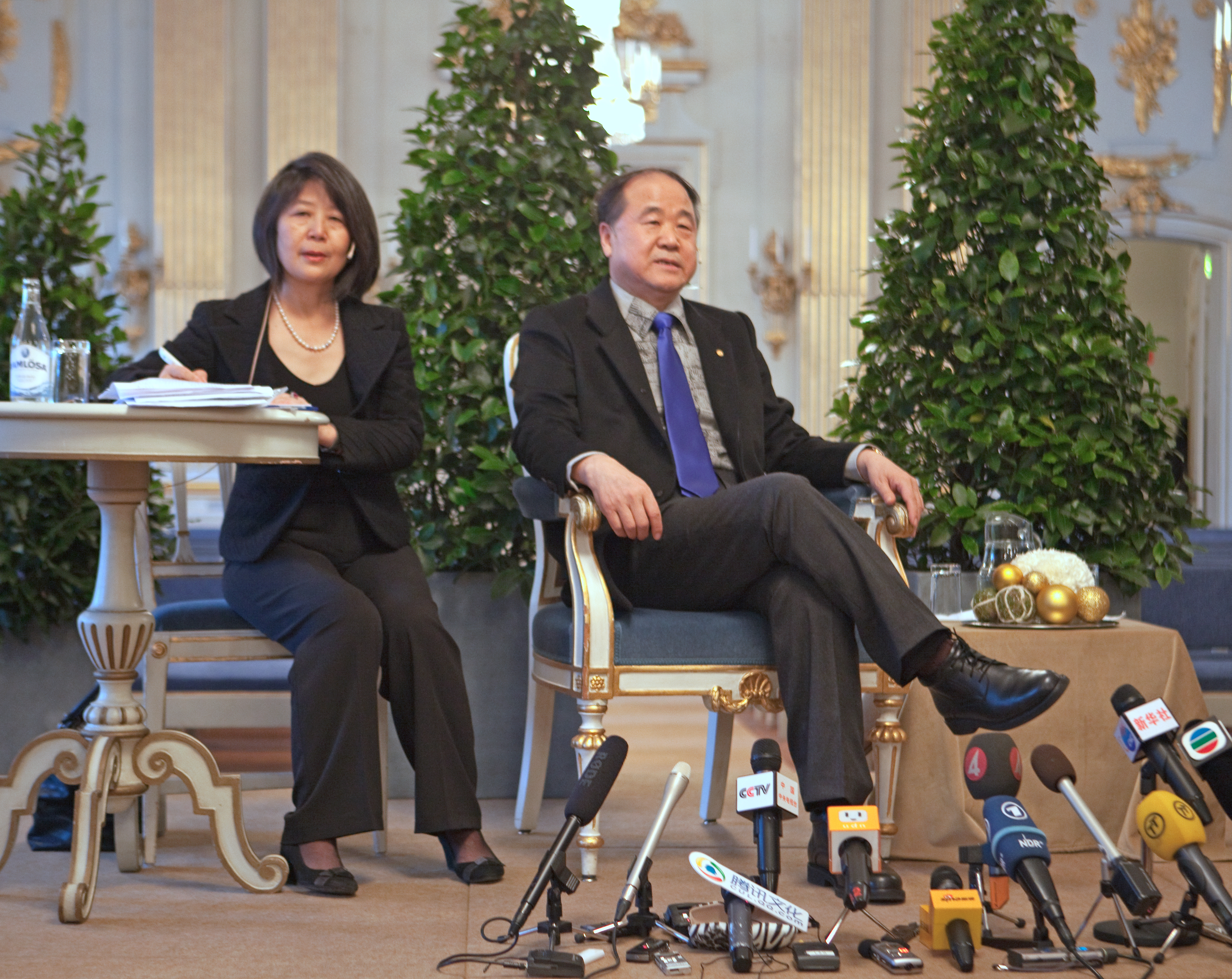

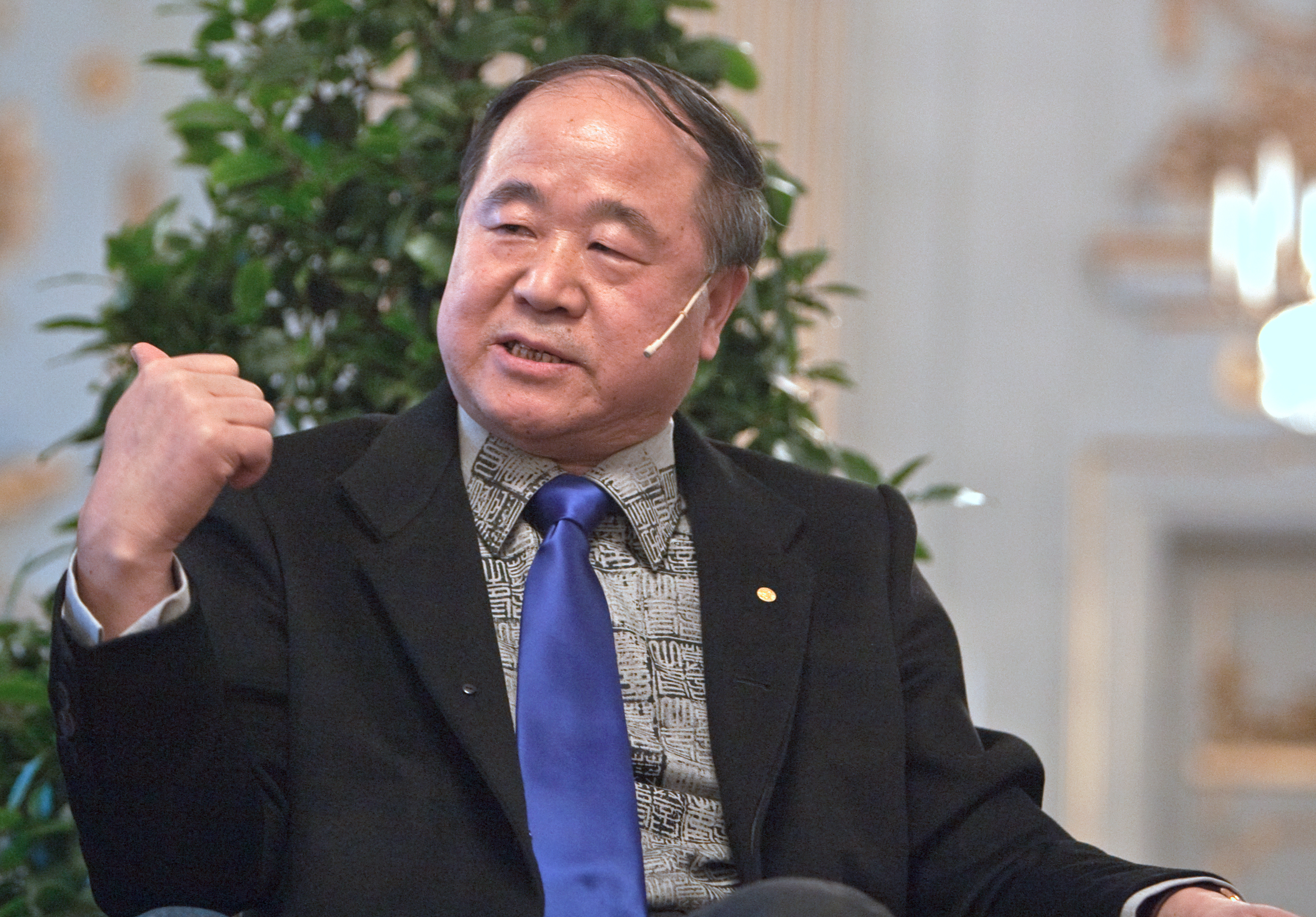

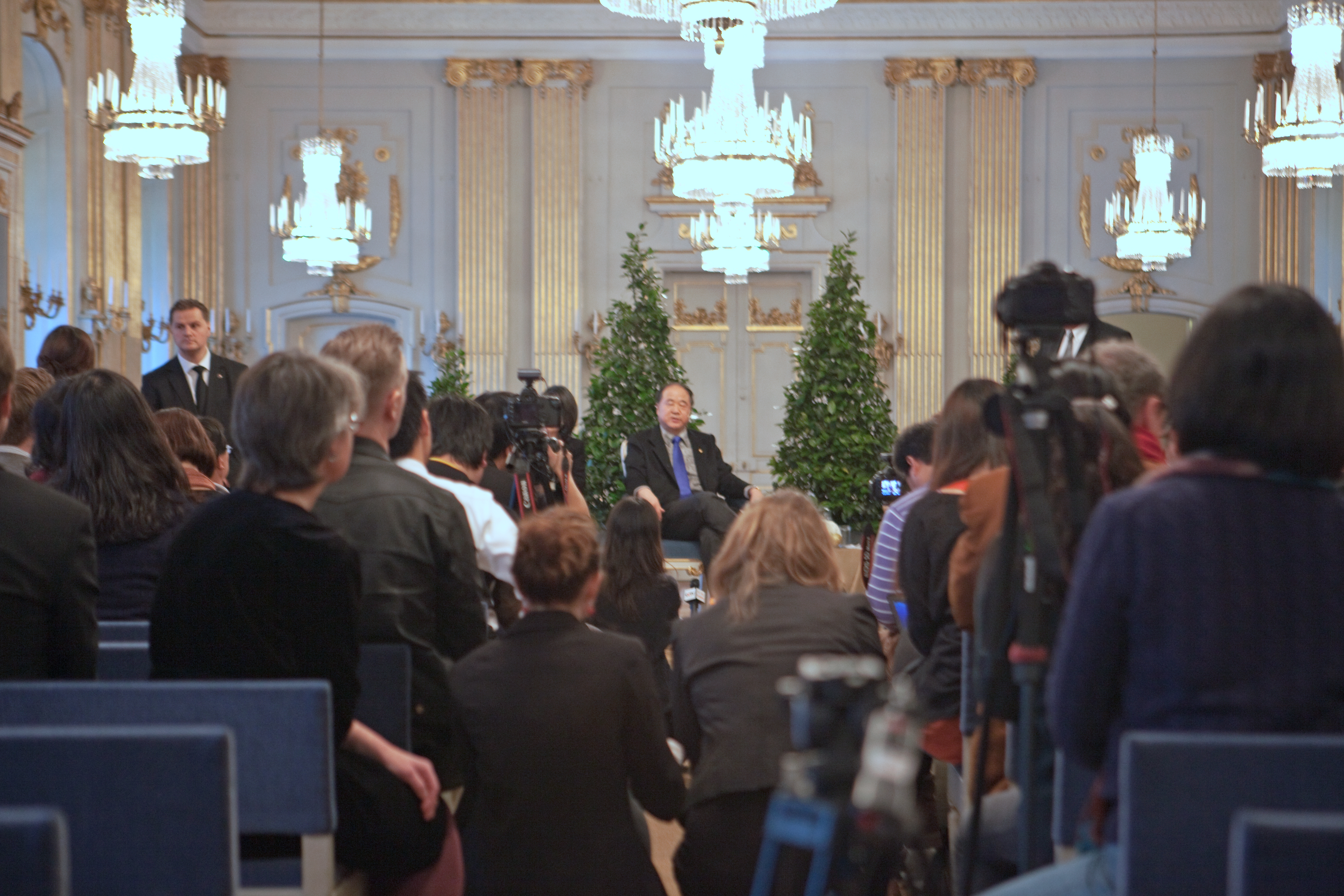
