= Shiyue =

Chinese literary magazine

- Frequency: Bimonthly
- Publisher: Beijing Publishing House
- First issue: August 1978
- Country: China
- Based in: Beijing
- Language: Chinese
- ISSN: 0257-5841

Shiyue (Chinese: 十月; Mandarin: [ʂɨ ɥy̯œ]) is a Chinese literary magazine. It was established in August 1978 as a quarterly periodical in Beijing. Since 1980 Shiyue has been published bimonthly.

== History ==
The main founder, Wang Shimin, was director of the Literature and Art Department of "Beijing Publishing House". Mao Dun, a Chinese novelist and journalist, wrote a foreword for the first issue. Several other editors contributed to the founding.

Shiyue concentrated on novellas in its early phase. The novella was unlike literary periodicals that people had known in the past, which generally published short stories. When the first issue was launched, it drew readers from all classes of society and was considered the first literary magazine published after the Cultural Revolution.

It published many important Chinese literary works, including Gao Xingjian's early drama works, such as Station and Absolute Signal. Mo Yan, a Nobel Prize-winning Chinese novelist, had his novels 'Life and Death Are Wearing Me Out' and 'The Garlic Ballads' published in the magazine.

== Events ==
- Deserted City

Jia Pingwa's novel Deserted City, which proved to be a smash hit in China, was published in the magazines 4th issue in 1993. The book was published by "Beijing Publishing House", a bestseller, but soon afterwards was banned throughout China. Due to threat of prosecution, the former associate editor of Shiyue magazine and the executive editor of Deserted City Tian Zhenying, was forced to take early retirement. Xie Dajun, the former chief editor of Shiyue Magazine, was removed from the magazine office.

== Notable works ==
- Jia Pingwa's novel Ruined City
- Zhang Chengzhi's novel Rivers of the Northand The Black Steed
- Zhang Xianliang's novel My Bodhi Tree
- Yan Lianke's novel Dream of Ding Village

== Awards and honours ==
- 1999, won the 1st National Periodical Prize.
- 2000, won Top10 Periodicals of North China.
- 2003, won the 2nd National Periodical Prize.
- 2005, won the 3rd National Periodical Prize.
- 2008, won the 1st Governmental Publishing Award.
