= Red Sorghum =

Red Sorghum may refer to:

- Sorghum bicolor, a grass usually cultivated for food
- Red Sorghum (novel), a 1986 Chinese novel by Mo Yan
  - Red Sorghum (film), a 1987 Chinese film based on Mo Yan's novel
  - Red Sorghum (TV series), a 2014 Chinese TV series based on Mo Yan's novel

== See also ==
- Sorghum (disambiguation)
