= Zhu Yawen =

Chinese actor

- 朱亚文
- Born: April 21, 1984 (age 42); Yangcheng, Jiangsu, China
- Education: Beijing Film Academy
- Occupation: Actor
- Years active: 2002–present
- Agent: Easy Entertainment
- Spouse: Shen Jiani (m. 2016)
- Children: 2

Chinese name
- Simplified Chinese: 朱亚文
- Traditional Chinese: 朱亞文
Transcriptions
Standard Mandarin
- Hanyu Pinyin: Zhū Yàwén

Zhu Yawen (Chinese: 朱亚文; born April 21, 1984) is a Chinese actor. He appeared in the films The Witness and The Founding of an Army; and the television series Red Sorghum and Empress of the Ming. In 2018, he took part in variety show The Sound and became champion. In 2019, he joined the variety show Keep Running as a cast member.

Zhu ranked 80th on Forbes China Celebrity 100 list in 2019.

== Early life ==
Zhu attended Beijing Film Academy.

== Personal life ==
Zhu married Shen Jiani in 2016. They have two children together.

== Career ==
Zhu rose to fame for his role in the 2006 war drama Pathfinding to the Northeast. The drama was critically acclaimed, and received the Golden Eagle Award for Best Television Series (China) and the Flying Apsaras Award for Outstanding Television Series.

This was followed with a leading role in another war drama The Ultimate Master of War in 2009, which established his popularity in China. The same year, he starred in the military drama Great Northern Wilderness, which received the Flying Apsaras Awards for Outstanding Television Series.

In 2010, Zhu starred in the romance drama Army Stories in Highland and received acclaim for his performance.

In 2011, Zhu was awarded the Asian New Talent award at the Shanghai International Film Festival.

In 2012, Zhu was nominated at the International Emmy Award for his performance in the aviation war drama Flying Eagle.

In 2014, Zhu starred alongside Zhou Xun in the television adaptation of Red Sorghum by Mo Yan. However, his portrayal of the male lead Yu Zhan'ao, was criticized as stiff and unnatural. The same year, he featured in the biographical film The Golden Era directed by Ann Hui, playing the role of Duanmu Hongliang.

In 2015, Zhu starred alongside Ma Yili in Swan Dive for Love, a modern drama which narrates the story of a white-collar couple striving to make themselves richer amid a series of challenges. Zhu won the Best Actor award in the contemporary drama category for his performance. The same year, he played the antagonist in crime thriller The Witness.

In 2019, Zhu starred in the historical drama Empress of the Ming, portraying Zhu Zhanji.

== Filmography ==
=== Film ===
| Year | English title | Chinese title | Role | Notes/Ref. |
|---|---|---|---|---|
| 2007 | A Revolutionist and His Mother | 星星之火 | Wang Jinmei | |
| 2011 | You Are My Brother | 你是我兄弟 | Zheng Shiyi | |
| 2012 | Mystery | 浮城謎事 | Qin Feng | |
| 2014 | The Golden Era | 黃金時代 | Duanmu Hongliang | |
| 2015 | Bride Wars | 新娘大作战 | Luo Dan | |
| 2015 | The Witness | 我是证人 | Tang Zheng | |
| 2016 | When Larry Met Mary | 陆垚知马俐 | Zhao Ben | |
| 2017 | The Founding of an Army | 建军大业 | Zhou Enlai | |
| 2018 | The Poet | 诗人 | Li Wu | |
| 2019 | Welcome to Bear Town | 欢迎来到熊仁镇 | He Bi | |
| 2019 | The Captain | 中国机长 | | |
| 2021 | Cliff Walkers | 悬崖之上 | Chu Liang | |
| 2021 | The Battle at Lake Changjin | 长津湖 | Mei Sheng | |
| 2022 | The Battle at Lake Changjin II | 长津湖之水门桥 | Mei Sheng | |
| 2023 | The Volunteers: To the War | 志愿军：雄兵出击 | Wu Benzheng | |

=== Television series ===
| Year | English title | Chinese title | Role | Notes/Ref. |
|---|---|---|---|---|
| 2004 | Winter Passing | 走过冬季 | Ling Lingling | |
| 2005 | | 阳光雨季 | Yue Chaofei | |
| 2006 | Step Brothers | 非亲兄弟 | Chen Tianyu | |
| 2007 | | 雪琉璃 | Li Ke | |
| 2008 | Pathfinding to the Northeast | 闯关东 | Zhu Chuanwu | |
| 2008 | | 豪门金枝 | Zhong Lin | |
| 2009 | Army Stories in Highland | 高地 | Wang Qi | |
| 2009 | Great Northern Wilderness | 情系北大荒 | Chi Pao | |
| 2009 | Memories of The Golden Flame | 烽火影人 | Ouyang Pusheng | |
| 2009 | The Ultimate Master of War | 兵圣 | Sun Wu | |
| 2010 | | 市委书记日记 | Han Xia | |
| 2010 | Red Sorghum | 高粱红了 | Lin Yusheng | |
| 2010 | Love in the Vast Land | 爱在苍茫大地 | Wen Mingyuan | |
| 2011 | The Distant Eagle “Yuaqu de Feiying” | 远去的飞鹰 | Gao Zhihang | |
| 2012 | My Natasha | 我的娜塔莎 | Chong Tiande | |
| 2012 | Nos Annees Francaises | 我们的法兰西岁月 | Zhou Enlai | |
| 2013 | The Blood Brothers | 铁血兄弟 | Jiang Liu | |
| 2013 | The Story of Zheng Yang Gate | 正阳门下 | Han Chunming | |
| 2014 | | 地火 | Li Zhongming | |
| 2014 | Red Sorghum | 红高粱 | Yu Zhanao | |
| 2015 | Say No For Youth | 天生要完美 | Yun Tianyao | |
| 2015 | Swan Dive for Love | 北上广不相信眼泪 | Zhao Xiaoliang | |
| 2016 | Two Families | 姐妹兄弟 | Song Jianguo | |
| 2016 | Happy Mitan | 欢喜密探 | | Cameo |
| 2016 | City Still Believe in Love | 北上广依然相信爱情 | Wang Mao | |
| 2017 | Across The Ocean To See You | 漂洋过海来看你 | Zheng Chu | |
| 2018 | Partners | 合伙人 | Gu Dongqing | |
| 2019 | Empress of the Ming | 大明风华 | Zhu Zhanji | |
| 2020 | Kidnapping Game | 绑架游戏 | Yu Hai | |
| 2020 | Together | 在一起 | Dr. Li Jian Hui | |
| 2021 | The Lion's Secret | 赖猫的狮子倒影 | Liu Qing | |
| 2025 | A Love Never Lost | 人生若如初见 | Wu Tianbai | |
| 2026 | Swords Into Plowshares | 太平年 | Zhao Kuangyin | |
| TBA | The Investigator | 商业调查师 | Xia Dong | |

=== Variety show ===
| Year | English title | Chinese title | Role | Notes/Ref. |
|---|---|---|---|---|
| 2015 | Real Hero | 真心英雄 | Cast member | |
| 2019 | Keep Running | 奔跑吧 | Cast member | |

== Discography ==
=== Singles ===
| Year | English title | Chinese title | Album | Notes/Ref. |
|---|---|---|---|---|
| 2015 | "Today You Will Marry Me" | 今天你要嫁给我 | Bride Wars OST | with Angelababy, Chen Xiao and Ni Ni |
| 2019 | —N/a | "造亿万吨光芒" | Keep Running theme song | With Li Chen, Angelababy, Zheng Kai, Wang Yanlin, Lucas Wong and Song Yuqi |

== Awards and nominations ==
| Year | Award | Category | Nominated work | Result | Ref. |
|---|---|---|---|---|---|
| 2011 | 14th Shanghai International Film Festival | Asian New Talent Award | —N/a | Won | |
| 2012 | 40th International Emmy Award | Best Performance by an Actor | Flying Eagle | Nominated | |
| 2014 | 21st Shanghai Television Festival | Best Actor | Red Sorghum | Nominated | |
| 2016 | 3rd Asia Rainbow TV Awards | Best Actor (Modern Drama) | Red Sorghum | Won | |
| 2016 | 19th Huading Awards | Best Actor (Contemporary Drama) | Swan Dive for Love | Won | |
| 2017 | 31st Golden Rooster Awards | Best Supporting Actor | When Larry Met Mary | Nominated | |
| 2018 | 34th Hundred Flowers Awards | Best Actor | The Founding of an Army | Nominated | |
| 2019 | 17th Golden Phoenix Awards | Society Award | The Founding of an Army | Won | |
| 2019 | 6th The Actors of China Award Ceremony | Best Actor (Emerald Category) | Partners | Nominated | |
| 2020 | 7th The Actors of China Award Ceremony | Best Actor (Sapphire) | —N/a | Pending | |
