= The Republic of Wine =

Satirical novel by Mo Yan

The Republic of Wine: A Novel
- First edition (Chinese)
- Author: Mo Yan
- Original title: 酒国/酒國
- Translator: Howard Goldblatt
- Language: Chinese
- Genre: Satire, Detective novel, Comedy, social commentary
- Publisher: Hong Fan (China); Hamish Hamilton (UK)
- Publication date: 1992
- Publication place: China
- English publication date: 2000
- Media type: Print
- Pages: 356 (English)
- ISBN: 0-14-025677-6
- OCLC: 59544313

The Republic of Wine: A Novel (simplified Chinese: 酒国; traditional Chinese: 酒國; pinyin: Jiǔguó) is a satirical novel by Mo Yan, which was first published in 1992. The novel explores the relationship between Chinese people and food and drink, and comments on government corruption and excesses. It was translated to English by Howard Goldblatt.

The novel has two distinct narrative threads, one of a standard fiction form following a detective, and the other a series of letters between "Mo Yan" and an aspiring author who is a fan of his work. The book contains ten chapters; each chapter contains several parts. The "detective" thread follows a special investigator, Ding Gou'er, sent to rural China to investigate claims of cannibalism. The "letters" thread contains letters exchanged between Li Yidou, an aspiring author, and "Mo Yan", as well as short stories that Li Yidou sends to "Mo Yan". As the novel progresses, the focus shifts from the Ding Gou'er standard narrative thread to the Li Yidou/Mo Yan thread. Some characters appear in both threads.

== Plot summary ==
=== Chapter one ===
1
Ding Gou'er, 48-year-old special investigator, gets a lift with a "lady trucker" (that he is quite taken with) to the Mount Luo Coal Mine, Liquorland (a fictional Chinese province), where he has been sent to investigate claims of cannibalism: claims of baby boys prepared as gourmet dishes. He is greeted by the Mine Director and Party Secretary and immediately taken to a banquet in his honour.
2
Introductory letter from Li Yidou ("one-pint Li") to Mo Yan. Li is a PhD candidate in liquor studies at Brewers College in Liquorland, and aspiring author. He includes a short story (Alcohol) that he wrote after watching Red Sorghum, the film adaption of Mo Yan's novel of the same name.
3
Mo Yan's reply to Li Yidou. Mo informs Li that he has sent his story to the editors of Citizens' Literature.
4
Li Yidou's short story, Alcohol.

=== Chapter two ===
1
The Mine Director and Party Secretary treat Ding to an expansive feast, and goad him into drinking copious amounts of alcohol. Ding does not hold his alcohol well. Deputy Head Diamond Jin, a Party official with a notorious capacity for drink, also joins them.
2
Second letter from Li to Mo, and Li's second story, Meat Boy, which he calls "grim realism". Li is now bolder, in his requests to Mo's assistance to become a published author, comparing himself to Lu Xun and saying, "If you have to host a meal [to get it published], go ahead. If a gift is required, you have my blessing.""
3
Mo's reply to Li, commenting on Meat Boy.
4
Li's short story, Meat Boy. One day two parents prepare their baby boy for a special event. The father, Jin Yuanbao, takes the boy on a journey to the Special Purchasing Section of the Culinary Academy in a village across the river. He waits with other parents and sons, perturbed by the presence of a small red demon. His son is eventually assessed by the staff there and judged to be "top grade." Jin is paid 2140 yuan.

=== Chapter three ===
1
The centrepiece of the banquet is revealed, "Stork Delivering a Son". It appears to be a whole human baby boy, sitting up in a dish, and smells delicious. Ding draws his gun and accuses his company of cannibalism. Diamond Jin insists the dish is a culinary masterpiece -- a fake child. Ding panics and fires his gun wildly, shooting the baby boy in the head and collapses, drunk. The serving girls bring him sobering-up soup and he recovers somewhat. Diamond Jin explains how the fake boy is created and convinces Ding to eat a lotus root arm.
After further drinking, Ding has an out of body experience where he witnesses the serving girls taking his comatose body to an underground hotel room. While his body is there, a "scaly-skinned demon" enters the room and strips his body of useful implements.
2
Third letter from Li to Mo.
3
Short story Child Prodigy by Li, in the style of "demonic realism" (according to Li). It follows the children who were sold at the Special Purchasing Section, and the little demon's attempt to lead them away. The children are caught by authorities at the Special Purchasing Section, but the little demon escapes.
4
Mo's reply to Li.

== Characters ==
- Ding Gou'er, special investigator
- The lady trucker
- Deputy Head Diamond Jin
- Li Yidou
- Mo Yan
- Little red devil/man with scales
- Yuan Shuangyu, Li Yidou's academic advisor and father-in-law
- Li Yidou's mother-in-law
- Yu Yichi, a dwarf hotelier

== Reception and interpretation ==
The Republic of Wine received near unanimous praise from Western literary critics. Phillip Gabone of The New York Times wrote, “The Republic of Wine is a fantastical postmodernist hodgepodge that borrows elements from kung fu novels, detective thrillers, traditional Chinese tales of the supernatural, American westerns and magic realist fiction. Some readers may find, as Mo says of one of the student's stories, that this novel suffers from "overly loose organization and relative lack of authorial restraint," but there's no denying that in his juxtapositions of the horrific and the comic, the lyric and the scatological, Mo is poking fun at China's post-Mao reformist era while letting out a wrenching cri de coeur for the lost soul of his country.”

Literary magazine Publishers Weekly praised the novel writing that Mo Yan, "fashions a complex, self-conscious narrative structure full of echoes and reflections. The novel grows progressively more febrile in tone, with pervasive, striking imagery and wildly imaginative digressions that cumulatively reveal the tremendous scope of his vision.”

Yun-Chu Tsai has interpreted the novel as criticizing the increasing disparities in wealth and status in Chinese society and the increasing commodification of life. The book depicts a society where the "pleasure and desire for delicacies" of the wealthy matter more than the lives of the poor, until "the inferior in social rank becomes food". Likewise, the satirical exaggeration of the novel shows where commodification might lead. In one of the embedded stories, the inventor of the "braised baby" argues that "the babies we are about to slaughter and cook are small animals in human form that are, based upon strict, mutual agreement, produced to meet the special needs of Liquorland's developing economy and prosperity", not essentially different from other animals raised for consumption or other goods produced for sale. If anything can become a commodity based on the mutual consent of buyer and seller, then Liquorland's cannibalism is just the logical consequence.

== See also ==
- Child cannibalism
- Life and Death Are Wearing Me Out
- A Modest Proposal
