= Red Forest (disambiguation) =

The Red Forest is a forest destroyed by nuclear fallout from the Chernobyl disaster in the exclusion zone.

Red Forest may also refer to:

- The Red Forest, a sculpture in Denver, Colorado, U.S.
- Red Forest (album), a 2012 album by If These Trees Could Talk, or the title song
- Red Forest (novel), a 1999 novel by Mo Yan
- "The Red Forest" (12 Monkeys), a 2015 television episode

== See also ==
- Reducing emissions from deforestation and forest degradation (REDD)
