= The Woman with Flowers =

First edition

The Woman with Flowers is a 2012 collection of novellas by Nobel Prize in Literature winning author Mo Yan.
