= Red Sorghum (TV series) =

- poster
- Genre: War drama Period
- Based on: Red Sorghum by Mo Yan
- Written by: Zhao Dongling
- Directed by: Zheng Xiaolong
- Starring: Zhou Xun; Zhu Yawen; Huang Xuan; Yu Rongguang; Qin Hailu
- Ending theme: Jiu'er (九兒) by Han Hong & Hu Shasha
- No. of episodes: 60

Production
- Producer: Cao Ping
- Production companies: Shandong TV; Qingdao Golden Phoenix Film & Television Culture Company; Flower Film & TV

Original release
- Network: Beijing TV; Shandong TV; Zhejiang TV; Dragon TV
- Release: 27 October – 17 November 2014

Red Sorghum (Chinese: 红高粱; pinyin: Hóng Gāoliang) is a 2014 Chinese television series based on Nobel laureate Mo Yan's 1986 novel of the same name. Directed by Zheng Xiaolong, it also features the highly anticipated return of actress Zhou Xun to television after 10 years. The series chronicles the struggles of the protagonist Jiu'er (played by Zhou) in rural Shandong province in early 1930s. It aired simultaneously on four satellite television channels from 27 October to 17 November 2014 for 60 episodes.

== Cast ==
- Zhou Xun as Jiu'er / Dai Jiulian
- Zhu Yawen as Yu Zhan'ao
- Huang Xuan as Zhang Junjie
- Yu Rongguang as Zhu Haosan
- Qin Hailu as Shu Xian
- Matt William Knowles as AP Press Reporter

== Production ==
To reproduce the scenes of the novel, the Gaomi local government planted more than 200 hectares of sorghum. The field, now known as "Red Sorghum TV Production Base", became a shooting site for the TV series. More than 500 local residents performed as extras in the TV show.

== Reception ==
The series premiered to rave reviews online on Weibo and has enjoyed good ratings. It topped the ratings on four satellite TV channels for three weeks during its broadcast; and has been viewed more than 1.4 billion times on major streaming site iQiyi. According to Qilu Evening Post, the series also spawned viral greetings. Xinhua News Agency praised the drama, calling it a "classic in Chinese television history" and Hainan Daily called Zhou an "impeccable performer".

However, the series has been criticized the series as "too commercial" and "losing the touch of authenticity." The casting of Zhou in the role of the 19-year-old protagonist has also sparked a controversy.

== Ratings ==
CSM50 City Ratings
Air date	Episode	Beijing TV		Shandong TV		Zhejiang TV		Dragon TV	
Air date	Episode	Ratings	Rank	Ratings	Rank	Ratings	Rank	Ratings	Rank
October 27	01–03	1.151	2	1.099	3	0.659	8	0.729	7
October 28	04–06	1.158	3	1.236	2	0.942	5	0.752	7
October 29	07–09	1.195	3	1.298	2	0.921	5	0.780	7
October 30	10–12	1.154	3	1.380	2	0.971	4	0.781	7
October 31	13–15	1.264	2	1.392	1	0.850	7	0.976	6
November 1	16–17	1.468	3	1.548	1	0.842	7	1.154	4
November 2	18–19	1.474	3	1.684	1	0.899	6	1.111	4
November 3	20–22	1.505	1	1.428	3	0.905	6	1.000	5
November 4	23–25	1.528	1	1.390	3	1.222	4	0.994	5
November 5	26–28	1.472	3	1.478	2	1.270	4	1.078	5
November 6	29–31	1.645	1	1.463	4	1.481	3	0.910	7
November 7	32–34	1.666	1	1.569	2	1.290	4	0.945	7
November 8	35–36	1.796	1	1.757	2	1.093	5	1.108	4
November 9	37–38	1.594	2	1.781	1	1.412	4	1.202	5
November 10	39–41	1.415	3	1.563	2	1.409	4	0.976	6
November 11	42–44	1.655	2	1.614	3	1.374	4	1.029	5
November 12	45–47	1.668	2	1.617	3	1.387	4	1.055	5
November 13	48–50	1.710	2	1.584	3	1.440	4	1.030	5
November 14	51–53	1.685	2	1.711	1	1.324	4	1.027	5
November 15	54–55	1.920	1	1.884	2	1.145	4	1.105	5
November 16	56–57	1.939	1	1.910	2	1.345	4	1.184	5
November 17	58–60	1.949	1	1.870	3	1.494	4	1.178	5
Total		34.011	-	34.256	-	25.675	-	22.104	-
Average		1.546	-	1.557	-	1.167	-	1.005	-

- Highest ratings are marked in red, lowest ratings are marked in blue

== Awards and nominations ==
Year	Award	Category	Nominated work	Result
2014	China TV Drama Awards	Top Ten Television Series	Red Sorghum	Won
2014	China TV Drama Awards	Best Actress	Zhou Xun	Won
2014	China TV Drama Awards	Outstanding Contribution Award	Zheng Xiaolong	Won
2015	Shanghai Television Festival	Best Television Series	Red Sorghum	Nominated
2015	Shanghai Television Festival	Best Director	Zheng Xiaolong	Nominated
2015	Shanghai Television Festival	Best Actor	Zhu Yawen	Nominated
2015	Shanghai Television Festival	Best Actress	Zhou Xun	Won
2015	Shanghai Television Festival	Best Supporting Actor	Huang Xuan	Nominated
2015	Shanghai Television Festival	Best Supporting Actress	Qin Hailu	Won
2015	Huading Awards	Best Television Series	Red Sorghum	Won
2015	Huading Awards	Best Director	Zheng Xiaolong	Won
2015	Huading Awards	Best Actress	Zhou Xun	Won
2015	Huading Awards	Best Actor (Revolution-Era Drama)	Zhu Yawen	Nominated
2015	Huading Awards	Best Supporting Actress	Qin Hailu	Nominated
2015	Huading Awards	Best Supporting Actor	Huang Xuan	Nominated
2015	Huading Awards	Best Newcomer	Huang Xuan	Nominated
2015	Huading Awards	Best Producer	Cao Ping	Nominated
2015	Flying Apsaras Awards	Best Director	Zheng Xiaolong	Nominated
2015	Flying Apsaras Awards	Best Actress	Zhou Xun	Nominated
2015	Hengdian Film and TV Festival of China	Best Actress	Zhou Xun	Won
2016	China TV Golden Eagle Award	Best Director	Zheng Xiaolong	Won
2016	China TV Golden Eagle Award	Best Cinematography	Yu Fei, Wang He, Yang Haipeng	Won
2016	China TV Golden Eagle Award	Best Art Direction	Wang Shaolin, Yao Zhijie, Yang Kaiqiang	Nominated
2016	China TV Golden Eagle Award	Best Lightning	Zhang Xin'an, Chen Li	Nominated

== International broadcast ==
Country	Network(s)/Station(s)	Series premiere	Title
Thailand	Modernine TV	August 1, 2015	Tamnan Rak Thung Si Plerng (ตำนานรักทุ่งสีเพลิง, lit: Fire-Colored Field Love Legend)
Singapore; Malaysia; Indonesia; Cambodia; Thailand	Oh!K	Oct 13,2017	Wed To Fri 17:50 (SIN); 16:50 (JKT/BKK); 18:55 (HK)
