= Sandalwood Death =

Novel by Mo Yan

- First edition (Chinese)
- Author: Mo Yan
- Original title: 檀香刑
- Published: 2001
- English publication date: 2013

Sandalwood Death (Chinese: 檀香刑) is a 2001 novel by Nobel Prize in Literature winning author Mo Yan. The English version, translated by Howard Goldblatt, was released in 2013 by the University of Oklahoma Press.

== Plot summary ==
The novel addresses violence and chaos during the Boxer Rebellion.

Maoqiang (茂腔) opera singer Sun Bing, a leader of the Boxer Rebellion, is sentenced to death for attacking at the hands of his daughter's father-in-law, an executioner known for killing by "sandalwood death," a slow method of punishment in which the victim is skewered with a cured sandalwood rod.

In his author's note, Yan writes that he had difficulty telling friends what his book was about, eventually electing to tell them it was "all about sound."

== Background and social context ==
Mo Yan’s historical novel Sandalwood Death is set against the backdrop of the Boxer Uprising (1898-1900). According to the scholar Adrea Riemenschnitter, “The story challenges the ingrained dualism between foreign, modern imperialism and nationalist forms of rationality, and pre-modern, local patterns of behavior and thought.”

Mo Yan is particularly interested in the social class of his fictional characters and how others view them. For example, Zhao Xiaojia the husband of Meiniang, the novel’s main female character, is ostracized and looked down upon not only for being a butcher but also for being a fool.

So too is Meiniang herself, who because of her poor background does not have bound feet. As she says, “Big feet are the only thing holding me back.”
