= Shifu, You'll Do Anything for a Laugh =

Collection of novellas by Mo Yan

First edition (publ. Arcade Publishing)

Shifu, You'll Do Anything for a Laugh (original title: 师傅越来越幽默）is a 2001 collection of novellas by Nobel Prize in Literature winning author Mo Yan. The collection was translated from Chinese to English by Howard Goldblatt.

The novellas collected within this volume include:

- 'Shifu, You'll Do Anything for a Laugh'
- 'Man and Beast'
- 'Soaring'
- 'Iron Child'
- 'The Cure'
- 'Love Story'
- 'Shen Garden'
- 'Abandoned Child'

The title story follows Ding Shikou, a former factory worker abruptly laid off from his job. After failing to receive compensation from the government and other local authorities, Ding sets up a cottage in a graveyard and charges money for couples to enter and have sexual intercourse.

The title story acts as loose inspiration for the film Happy Times, directed by Zhang Yimou, starring Zhao Benshan and Dong Jie.
