= Meeting the Masters =

Collection of short stories by Mo Yan

- First edition
- Author: Mo Yan
- Published: 2012
- Publisher: Shanghai Art and Culture Press
- Publication place: China
- Pages: 510
- ISBN: 9787532146383

Meeting the Masters (simplified Chinese: 会见大师; traditional Chinese: 會見大師; pinyin: Huìjiàn dàshī) is a collection of 45 short stories by Nobel Prize in Literature-winning author Mo Yan. It was split into two parts, with the second half being subtitled "Dating with the Master" (Chinese: 与大师约会; pinyin: Yǔ dàshī yuēhuì ).

Stories include:

- "Fire Burning Flower Basket"
- "Moonlight"
- "Big Mouth"
- "Lover's Lover"
- "Fiction 9"
