= The Wall Can Sing =

2012 Chinese edition

The Wall Can Sing is a collection of 60 essays by Nobel Prize in Literature winning author Mo Yan.
