= Thirteen Steps =

Novel by Mo Yan

Chinese edition

Thirteen Steps is a novel by Nobel Prize in Literature winning author Mo Yan. It first appeared in 1988 in the literary magazine Wenxue si ji. It later appeared in book form in April 1989.

Sylvie Gentil translated the French version, Les treize pas, which was published by Éditions du Seuil in 1995.

== Plot ==
The protagonist is a madman locked in an iron cage. He relies upon the audience (or listeners) to feed him chalk so that he can prolong his own life and spit out tales of the miraculous and inconceivable about the lives of others. Through these unreliable narrative bits and pieces, community histories are being reinvented, creating "a grotesque and unpleasant aura" as it critiques the excesses of China's capitalist development.

== Reception ==
Bettina L. Knapp of Hunter College reviewed the French translation; Knapp stated that the author, referring to his intent to "brutalize" the people reading the book along with the characters within, "succeeds most admirably[...]in unadulterated, brilliant verbal arrays." According to Knapp, "macabre humor" is present.
