= Real Hero =

- Also known as: Chinese: 真心英雄; pinyin: Zhēnxīn Yīngxióng
- 真心英雄; Zhēnxīn Yīngxióng
- Genre: Psychological Game-variety show
- Starring: Yang Kun; Tong Dawei; Joe Cheng Yuan-chang; Jason Zhang; Zhu Yawen; Chen Xuedong
- Country of origin: China
- Original language: Chinese
- No. of seasons: 1

Production
- Running time: About 90 minutes

Original release
- Network: JSBC: Jiangsu Television
- Release: 24 July 2015 – present

Related
- The Exploration of The World

Real Hero (Chinese: 真心英雄; pinyin: Zhēnxīn Yīngxióng) is a Chinese variety show broadcast on JSBC: Jiangsu Television. It was first aired on 24 July 2015. This show is classified as a game-variety show, where at the start of each episode, one celebrity would be chosen by the producer to be the mole, whose main mission was to disrupt teamwork in his or her team and purposely throw challenges while keeping his or her identity a secret. After all the missions, the guests then voted on who they think is the mole and face punishment if voted correctly or not.

== Cast ==
Name	Age	Duration	Notes
Yang Kun	42	1 - present	Main Host
Tong Dawei	36	1 - present	
"Joe" Cheng Yuan-chang	33	1 - present	
"Jason" Zhang Jie	32	1 - present	
Zhu Yawen	31	1 - present	
"Cheney" Chen Xuedong	25	1 - present	

== List of episodes and guests ==
=== First Season ===
List of episodes in first season (episode 1/01 to 1/12)

Episode #	Broadcast Date (Filming Date)	Guest(s)	Teams & the Mole		Mission	Results
1/01	24 June 2015	Guo Jingming; Lee Hyun-jae	Real Team; Zhang Jie, Yang Kun, Chen Xuedong, Lee Hyun-jae The mole Yang Kun exposed	Hero Team; Zhu Yawen, Tong Dawei, Cheng Yuan-chang, Guo Jingming The mole Tong Dawei exposed	Find the real hero among the group fake heroes	Result Hero Team Wins

== List of guests ==
The following is a compilation of guests and the number of time they have been on the show. They are listed in order of appearance.

Guest	Episode(s)	# of Episodes Appeared	# of Appearances
Guo Jingming	1/01	1/01	1
Lee Hyun-jae	1/01	1/01	1
