= Pow! (novel) =

Book by Mo Yan

POW!
- First edition (Chinese)
- Author: Mo Yan
- Original title: 四十一炮
- Translator: Howard Goldblatt
- Language: Chinese
- Genre: Novel
- Publisher: (Eng. trans.) Seagull Books
- Publication date: 2003
- Publication place: China
- English publication date: 15 December 2012
- Media type: Print (Hardback
- Pages: 386 pp (Eng. trans. edition)
- ISBN: 0857420763 (Eng. trans. edition)
- Preceded by: Frog

Pow! (Chinese: 四十一炮; pinyin: sìshíyī pào) is a 2003 novel by the Chinese author and Nobel laureate Mo Yan. The novel's protagonist is Luo Xiaotong, a village boy with a passion for story-telling. It is set in a temple, where Luo recounts the story of his life to an old monk. He describes the difficult circumstances of his childhood in the "Slaughterhouse Village," a fictional town in which the population is obsessed with the consumption of meat and where corruption is rife.

The novel has been interpreted as an allegorical commentary on the state of contemporary Chinese society, though Mo himself maintains that he is merely a storyteller, uninterested in ideology.
