= Big Breasts and Wide Hips =

1996 novel by Mo Yan

Big Breasts & Wide Hips
- First edition (Chinese)
- Author: Mo Yan
- Original title: 丰乳肥臀
- Translator: Howard Goldblatt
- Language: Chinese
- Genre: magical realism, historical fiction
- Publisher: Arcade Publishing
- Publication date: 1996
- Publication place: China
- English publication date: 2005
- Media type: Print
- Pages: 552
- ISBN: 978-1611453430
- OCLC: 59544313

Big Breasts and Wide Hips is a novel by Mo Yan. It won the Dajia Honghe Literature Prize in 1997 and was translated to English by Howard Goldblatt in 2005. The book uses an epic narrative structure that follows multiple generations of the Shangguan family to explore major events in 20th century Chinese history such as the Chinese Communist Revolution, the Chinese Civil War, the Second Sino-Japanese War, the Great Leap Forward, and the Cultural Revolution. In 1997, Big Breasts and Wide Hips won China's Master Literature Award.

== Characters ==
- Shangguan Lu, the mother.
- Shangguan Laidi, Eldest Sister, daughter of Shangguan Lu and Big Paw. Married to Sha Yueliang, then forced to marry Speecless Sun. Has a childwith Birdman Han. Mother of Sha Zaohua and Parrot Han.
- Shangguan Zhaodi, Second Sister, daughter of Shangguan Lu and Big Paw. Married to Sima Ku. Mother of twins, Sima Feng and Sima Huang.
- Shangguan Lingdi, Third Sister, also known as Bird Fairy. Daughter of Shangguan Lu and a peddler of ducks. First wife of Speechless Sun. Mother of Big Mute and Little Mute.
- Shangguan Xiangdi, Fourth Sister, daughter of Shangguan Lu and a doctor. Sold herself to a brothel during the famine in order to save her family.
- Shangguan Pandi, Fifth Sister, daughter of Shangguan Lu and a butcher. Married to Lu Liren. Mother of Lu Shengli. Later changed her name to Ma Ruilian.
- Shangguan Niandi, Sixth Sister, daughter of Shangguan Lu and a monk. Married to the American pilot Babbitt.
- Shangguan Qiudi, Seventh Sister. Shangguan Lu gave birth to her after raped by deserters. Adopted by a Russian Duchess.
- Shangguan Yunü, Eighth Sister, blind, daughter of Shangguan Lu and the Swedish missionary Pastor Malory. Shangguan Jintong's twin sister.
- Shangguan Jintong, 'me' in the novel, son of Shangguan Lu and Pastor Malory. Afflicted with breast fetishism.

== Plot ==
At the turn of the 20th century, a young girl, Xuan'er, is orphaned and raised by her aunt and uncle, who arrange her marriage into the Shangguan family of Northeast Gaomi Township in Shandong province. After marrying, she becomes known as Shangguan Lu and is pressured by her cruel mother-in-law to produce a male heir. Her husband is sterile, and she has seven daughters by different men: two by her uncle Big Paw, followed by children fathered by a duck peddler, a doctor, a butcher and a monk; her seventh daughter is conceived through rape. An affair with Swedish Christian missionary Pastor Malory results in twins: her eighth daughter, who is blind, and her first son, Jintong.

During the war with the Japanese, Shangguan Lu's daughters grow up and follow different paths, marrying men of opposing political loyalties. Meanwhile, Shangguan Lu devotes herself to Jintong, who becomes obsessed with breasts and dependent on her breastmilk, eventually suckling constantly from a goat when her milk runs out.

When Pastor Malory and Shangguan Lu are surprised at the church by soldiers of the Black Donkey Musket Band, the soldiers rape her in front of her children. Unable to bear the disgrace, Pastor Malory jumps from the church steeple and dies. First sister elopes with the band's leader, Sha Yueliang. Second sister marries Sima Ku, a leader of the anti-Japanese resistance who destroys a railway bridge, killing Japanese soldiers and provoking reprisals that nearly wipe out his family. He and second sister escape, leaving their son with Shangguan Lu.

Third daughter becomes devoted to "Birdman Han", whose skill with a slingshot keeps the family fed during famine. After he leaves, she becomes revered as the "Bird Fairy", giving advice and telling fortunes. The family nevertheless falls into starvation and, while travelling to a soup kitchen, encounters numerous corpses. Shangguan Lu eventually takes her daughters to the county market, where seventh sister is sold to a wealthy Russian aristocrat and fourth sister voluntarily enters prostitution so the family can afford food.

Communist commander Lu Liren and his "demolition battalion" subsequently seize Northeast Gaomi Township. After Japan's surrender in 1945, however, Sima Ku returns with Nationalist troops, expelling Lu Liren. Pandi gives birth to Lu Liren's child and leaves it with Shangguan Lu before departing to find him.

Sima Ku remains in control, accompanied by American soldier Babbitt. During a parachute demonstration, Babbitt lands on sixth sister and they fall in love. Their lavish wedding is interrupted when Lu Liren's forces attack and capture Sima Ku, Babbitt, second and sixth sisters and other villagers. Second sister is killed during an attempted escape. Sima Ku escapes while being transported across the Flood Dragon River, while sixth sister insists on accompanying Babbitt and both are eventually executed.

A Communist VIP then encourages poor peasants to denounce wealthy landowners. Lu Liren consequently sentences Sima Ku's young twin daughters, Sima Feng and Sima Huang, to death; they are shot beside the river, while Sima Liang escapes.

During the ensuing Chinese civil war, Lu Liren orders the villagers to evacuate to Da'ze Mountain in winter. Many die from hunger and exposure, and Shangguan Lu ultimately leads her family back across the Flood Dragon River to the village in early 1948. Years later, Sima Ku is discovered after saving Jintong from a beating by schoolmates and is executed.

First sister, widowed by Sha Yueliang, is forced to marry Speechless Sun, a crippled and mute Communist soldier who abuses her. When Birdman Han returns, she begins an affair with him and kills Speechless Sun with a door bolt after he discovers it. She is permitted to give birth to Birdman Han's child before being publicly executed.

During the Great Leap Forward, Jintong works on a commune and meets fifth sister, now known as "Ma Ruilian", who conducts agricultural experiments. His supervisor, Commander Long, an ageing virgin, demands that Jintong sleep with her. When he cannot become aroused at gunpoint, she kills herself. Overcome with remorse, Jintong has sex with her corpse before escaping punishment when a flood washes away her body. However, the journal of seventh sister, who has returned from Russia, is discovered, and Jintong is sentenced to 15 years in prison.

After his release, Jintong remains dependent on his elderly mother and unable to eat anything but breastmilk. She sends him to Old Jin, a single-breasted woman who runs a recycling centre, in an attempt to make him independent. He nurses from her and is briefly seduced, but is expelled when her husband returns and threatens them.

In the 1990s, Jintong becomes involved with "Parrot Han", the son of first sister and Birdman Han, and his wife's attempts to obtain bank loans from the city's mayor for their bird sanctuary. After failing to secure the loans, Jintong returns to his mother. The local authorities plan to demolish the Shangguan family hut for an amusement park, but Sima Liang, now a wealthy businessman, arrives by helicopter and stops the demolition. He establishes Jintong in a women's brassiere shop, which Jintong names "Unicorn" after a radio announcer he remembers from the Cultural Revolution. Jintong loses the shop after the announcer's daughter tricks him into marriage and quickly divorces him. The story ends with Jintong entering a church and meeting his long-lost half-brother, Pastor Malory's other child, who has become a priest.

== Reception ==
Big Breasts and Wide Hips received critical acclaim from Western literary critics who praised Mo Yan's inventive storytelling and use of his unique style of hallucinatory realism to describe the surrealism the average Chinese peasant felt living under the Japanese occupation. Contributor for The Guardian, Paul Mason declared Mo Yan to be the Chinese equivalent of Thomas Pynchon, concluding that Mo Yan was "unlike any of the great living authors."

Jonathan Yardley of The Washington Post praised Mo Yan's dedication to feminism throughout the novel, but offered numerous reservations about the quality of the novel. Most of Yardley's criticism focuses on the stale prose and clumsy characterization of Jintong.

Mo Yan received criticism from The New York Review of Books for the novel's treatment of sensitive events such as the Great Leap Forward, in which the author "had fun with the craziness but leaves out the disaster." Other reviewers have pushed back on this characterization, noting that "Mo Yan’s intended readers know that the Great Leap Forward led to a catastrophic famine, and any artistic approach to historical trauma is inflected or refracted."

== Themes ==
John Updike, in a review for The New Yorker noted that the novel contains many scenes of war, sexual violence and famine that serve to illustrate the "crushing misery of Chinese existence in the last century."

The female characters symbolize Chinese endurance, and "a maternal love so large that it is conflated with the nation," while history itself is explored as bodily trauma, as the "female body provides the site to nurture the family members as they follow their inevitable confrontations and conflicts in the ensuing political struggles and historical evolution." The author uses the male narrator and anti-hero Jintong, on the other hand, to symbolize weakness and dependency in Chinese society through his lifelong addiction to breastmilk.
