= Sorghum (disambiguation) =

Sorghum, a widespread modern crop species, the world's 5th largest cereal by tonnage

- Sorghum (genus): The genus that contains the crop and its wild relatives
- Sweet sorghum, any of the varieties of the sorghum crop plant with a high sugar content
- Sorghum halepense or Johnsongrass, a weed species in the genus

Sorghum may also refer to:

- Camp Sorghum was a Confederate States Army prisoner of war camp in Columbia, South Carolina during the American Civil War
- Bushton, Kansas, United States (formerly Sorghum)

== See also ==
- Red Sorghum (disambiguation)
