= Joy (novella collection) =

《欢乐》Joy is a collection of eight Chinese novellas (six of which available in English) written in the 1980s by Nobel Prize in Literature winning author Mo Yan.

While the novella "Joy" and those included within the collection are fictional, it is thought that the intention of the short stories was to satirize and represent different attributes of modern China.
