= Happy Times (2000 film) =

- American film poster
- Directed by: Zhang Yimou
- Written by: Gui Zi
- Based on: Short story by Mo Yan
- Produced by: Zhou Ping; Yang Qinglong; Zhang Weiping; Zhao Yu
- Starring: Zhao Benshan; Dong Jie
- Cinematography: Hou Yong
- Edited by: Zhai Rui
- Music by: San Bao
- Release dates: December 31, 2000 (China); November 10, 2001 (Pusan); February 7, 2002 (Berlin)
- Running time: 102 minutes
- Country: China
- Language: Mandarin

Happy Times (simplified Chinese: 幸福时光; traditional Chinese: 幸福時光; pinyin: Xìngfú Shíguāng) is a 2000 tragicomedy film directed by Chinese filmmaker Zhang Yimou, starring Zhao Benshan and Dong Jie. It is based loosely on the short story, Shifu, You'll Do Anything for a Laugh (师傅越来越幽默) by Mo Yan; the story appears in English translation in the collection of the same title translated by Howard Goldblatt. Though the story and the film share a common opening, they begin to diverge almost immediately.

== Plot ==
In the city of Dalian, an old and laid-off factory worker (played by Zhao Benshan) seeks to marry an obese and divorced middle-aged woman (Dong Lifan), who he hopes will bring him warmth and comfort in life. So he sets out desperately to find a way to make money for the posh wedding he has promised. The hapless man and his friend (Fu Biao) decide to renovate a broken bus on top of a hill that is popular for romantic couples. He turns this bus into a small dwelling he names "Happy Times Hotel," which he will rent to willing couples visiting the hill.

As he brags about his newly opened "hotel" and how much money he is making, he finds himself entrusted with the care of the woman's emaciated, blind stepdaughter Wu Ying (Dong Jie), who is unwanted in the house. Not willing to expose his scheme and ruin his attempt to get married, the man enlists the help of his retired co-workers, who agree to do all they can to make the lonely girl happy at her new job as a masseuse in the "hotel."

As the story unfolds, a touching friendship between the childless man and the dejected, orphaned girl under his care develops, leading to a moving and surprising conclusion.

Although the film was criticized as sentimental, it has a sharp eye for the absurdities generated both by China's socialist past, and by the encroaching capitalism. The two endings, one for the domestic audience and the other for the international audience, suggest a bleak future for those left behind in China's rush to power and wealth.

== Cast ==
- Zhao Benshan
- Dong Jie
- Fu Biao
- Li Xuejian
- Niu Ben
- Tao Hong (cameo)
- Sun Honglei (cameo)
- Fan Wei (cameo)

== Reception ==
=== Critical response ===
Rotten Tomatoes, a review aggregator, reports that 72% of 61 critics gave the film a positive review with the average rating of 6.4/10. The site's consensus reads: "One of Zhang's smaller films, Happy Times is nevertheless moving and bittersweet." Metacritic assigned the film a weighted average score of 63 out of 100, based on 23 critics, indicating generally favourable reviews.

Derek Elley of Variety called it "a modern-day character comedy with a touching edge", comparing it to 1960s European character comedies. In The New York Times, A. O. Scott described it as "a wise, gentle and sad new comedy" whose sentimentality "reverberates discreetly underneath a rough, matter-of-fact surface".

== See also ==
- Cinema of China
