= White Dog and the Swing =

2004 short story collection by Mo Yan

- 2012 Chinese edition (publ. Tsai Fong Books)
- Author: Mo Yan
- Genre: Short story collection
- Publication date: 2004

White Dog and the Swing is a 2004 collection of short stories by Nobel Prize in Literature winning author Mo Yan. It collects thirty short stories from the 1980s.
