= Modern Chinese Literature and Culture =

Academic journal

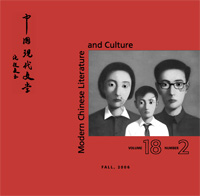
- Discipline: Chinese studies, culture, literature, film
- Language: English
- Edited by: Natascha Gentz and Christopher Rosenmeier

Publication details
- History: 1975-1981 as Modern Chinese Literature Newsletter, 1984-1998 as Modern Chinese Literature, 1999-present as Modern Chinese Literature and Culture
- Publisher: Edinburgh University Press
- Frequency: Biannual
- ISO 4: Find out here

Indexing
- ISSN: 1520-9857 (print); 2328-966X (web)

Links
- Journal homepage; Online access

Modern Chinese Literature and Culture is a peer-reviewed academic journal covering the culture of modern and contemporary China, with China understood in the sense of Greater China, including the People's Republic, Hong Kong, Taiwan, and Chinese overseas. The journal publishes two issues per year and features research on Chinese literature, film and television, popular culture, drama, visual art, material culture, etc. The time period covered is roughly from the mid-19th century to the present.

In 2021, Natascha Gentz and Christopher Rosenmeier became the editors-in-chief, taking over from Kirk A. Denton, and publication was transferred from Ohio State University to Edinburgh University Press. The journal is abstracted and indexed in the Arts and Humanities Citation Index, and issues appear on JSTOR following an embargo period. The publisher also offers subscribers electronic access to issues from 2020 onward.

Book reviews have not appeared in the print journal since 2003. They are instead published on the MCLC Resource Center, a website on modern China cultural studies that is affiliated with the journal. The MCLC Resource Center maintains a literature database and also publishes translations, interviews, bibliographies, and articles with a strong multimedia component. The journal publishes occasional special issues.
