= Yangcheng =

Yangcheng may refer to the following locations in China:

- Yangcheng County (阳城县), Jincheng, Shanxi
- Yangcheng Lake (阳澄湖), in Suzhou
- Yangcheng, Qingyuan County, Hebei (阳城镇), town
- Yangcheng, Ruicheng County (阳城镇), town in Shanxi
- Yangcheng, Yangshan County (阳城镇), town in Guangdong
- Yangcheng (historical city) (阳城), close to Dengfeng in Henan
- Guangzhou, formerly named Yangcheng (羊城)
