= Red Forest (novel) =

1999 novel by Mo Yan

First edition (Chinese) publ. 海天出版社

Red Forest is a 1999 novel by Nobel Prize in Literature winning author Mo Yan.
