= The Herbivorous Family =

Novel by Mo Yan

First edition publ. 华艺出版社 (Hua Yi Chubanshe)

The Herbivorous Family is a 1993 novel by Nobel Prize in Literature winning author Mo Yan.
