= The Garlic Ballads =

1988 novel

- First US edition (published by Viking Press)
- Author: Mo Yan
- Original title: 天堂蒜薹之歌
- Language: Chinese
- Publication date: 1988

The Garlic Ballads (Chinese: 天堂蒜薹之歌) is a 1988 novel by Nobel Prize–winning author Mo Yan. The book is about the 1987 garlic glut.

The novel was in fall 1987. It was published by the People's Liberation Army Publishing House. Unhappy with some of the editorial cuts, Mo Yan restored these in a 1988 Taiwan edition of the novel.

It was withdrawn from sale in China in 1989. In 1993, the ban on its sale in China was reversed. The 1993 edition removed an ironic prefatory Joseph Stalin quote, and adds a new final chapter. It also includes a preface stating, "The ultimate goal in writing this kind of novel is to hope that the phenomena it describes does not become a model for real life."
