= Life and Death Are Wearing Me Out =

Book by Mo Yan

- First edition (Chinese)
- Author: Mo Yan
- Translator: Howard Goldblatt
- Language: Chinese
- Genre: novel
- Publisher: (Eng. trans.) Arcade
- Publication date: 2006
- Publication place: China
- English publication date: 19 March 2008
- Media type: Print (Hardback & Paperback)
- Pages: 552 pp (Eng. trans. edition)
- ISBN: 1559708530 (Eng. trans. edition)

Life and Death Are Wearing Me Out (simplified Chinese: 生死疲劳; traditional Chinese: 生死疲勞; pinyin: shēngsǐ píláo) is a 2006 novel by Chinese writer Mo Yan, who won the Nobel Prize for Literature in 2012. The book is a historical fiction exploring China's development during the latter half of the 20th century through the eyes of a noble and generous landowner who is killed and reincarnated as various farm animals in rural China. It has drawn praise from critics, and was the recipient of the inaugural Newman Prize for Chinese Literature in 2009. An English translation was published in 2008.

== Plot ==
The novel chronicles life in a village from land reform to contemporary China, paralleling the protagonist's incarnations from human to animal forms.

The story's protagonist is Ximen Nao, a benevolent and noble landowner in Gaomi County, Shandong province. Although known for his kindness to peasants, Nao is targeted during Mao Zedong's land reform movement in 1948 and executed so that his land could be redistributed. The landlord Ximen Nao is accused of being a class enemy and is eventually shot by Huang Tong, an active executor of Mao Zedong’s policies.

Upon his death, Nao finds himself in the underworld, where Lord Yama tortures him in an attempt to elicit an admission of guilt. Nao maintains that he is innocent. While he was alive, he did not exploit the people as other landlords did. He was a very labor-loving and kind landlord. He adopted the orphan Lan Lian, who is also one of the main characters of the novel. In his several reincarnations, Ximen Nao also has many stories about Lan Lian's family. Ximen Nao did not understand why he was killed. So after his death, he was with hatred.While Yama believes in his innocence, he is nevertheless dissatisfied with Ximen Nao’s grudge against his enemies and the mortal world. Therefore, Lord Yama sends him back to earth where he is reborn as a donkey in his village on January 1, 1950. In subsequent reincarnations, he goes through life as a donkey, an ox, a pig, a dog, and a monkey, until finally being born again as a man. In the six reincarnations of Ximen Nao, it is the process of gradually forgetting his hatred. Donkey, cow, pig, dog, monkey and human. In the order of his reincarnation is also getting closer and closer to people. He went from wanting revenge at the beginning to thinking in animal terms at the end. This is the process of him fading away from his hatred. After getting rid of all feelings of hatred, Ximen Nao is eventually allowed to be reborn as a human once again. After all these reincarnations, however, the reader discovers that his family name is no longer Ximen, but Lan. Through the lens of various animals, the protagonist experiences the political movements that swept China under Communist Party rule, including the Great Chinese Famine and Cultural Revolution, all the way through to New Year's Eve in 2000. The author, Mo Yan, uses self-reference and by the end of the novel introduces himself as one of the main characters. In the novel, Mo Yan is more like a character who complements the narrator's perspective. There are two main narrators in the novel, one is the big-headed baby Lan Qiansui, who is reborn from Ximen Nao haunting. The other is Lan Qiansui's grandfather, Lan Jiefang. The author uses interpolation in the novel to allow the two narrators to narrate the story in cross-order in the novel. They describe the world as they see it and their perceptions of what is happening as they tell the story. Mo Yan, on the other hand, goes to add a third-party perspective to describe the story. He is a character who is not related to Simon's haunted family by blood. But he is connected to all the characters that appear in the story. He is always present around the protagonists. Mo Yan is an apparently unimportant, but indispensable character. Many fragments of fiction written by Mo Yan appear in the novel. In these fragments are Mo Yan's views and records of what happens in Ximentuan. He is more like a spectator of history. In his perspective, the reader can read a different perspective of the story.

Mo Yan criticizes social and political movements for their oppression and persecution of human life. His narratives describe animality to break down the anthropocentric barriers between human and animals. “The multi-dimensional representation of human animality has been the distinctive feature of Mo Yan’s literary practice of exploring humanity.” The animal allegory in this novel is based on a literary imagination of Buddhist samsara: a complete cycle starting from a human’s rebirth as an animal and ending with an animal’s rebirth as a human. This process not only expresses human’s existential wish to forget hatred, but also constructs an ecological holism of the harmony among humans, animals, and nature. In this way, ecological criticism intersects with political and cultural criticism.

== Reviews ==
Life and Death Are Wearing Me Out garnered highly favorable reviews, though some critics suggested the narrative style was at times difficult to follow. Jonathan Spence described it as "a wildly visionary and creative novel, constantly mocking and rearranging itself and jolting the reader with its own internal commentary. This is politics as pathology...a vast, cruel and complex story." Steven Moore of the Washington Post writes it is "a grimly entertaining overview of recent Chinese history...Mo Yan offers insights into communist ideology and predatory capitalism that we ignore at our peril. This 'lumbering animal of a story,' as he calls it, combines the appeal of a family saga set against tumultuous events with the technical bravura of innovative fiction."

The book's translator, Howard Goldblatt, nominated it for the 2009 Newman Prize for Chinese Literature, writing "it puts a human (and frequently bestial) face on the revolution, and is replete with the dark humor, metafictional insertions, and fantasies that Mo Yan’s readers have come to expect and enjoy." Kirkus Book Reviews called the novel "epic black comedy...This long story never slackens; the author deploys parallel and recollected narratives expertly, and makes broadly comic use of himself as a meddlesome, career-oriented hack whose versions of important events are, we are assured, not to be trusted. Mo Yan is a mordant Rabelaisian satirist, and there are echoes of Laurence Sterne's Tristram Shandy in this novel's rollicking plenitude."
