= Gaomi =

County-level city in Shandong, China

Gaomi 高密市 Kaomi
- County-level city
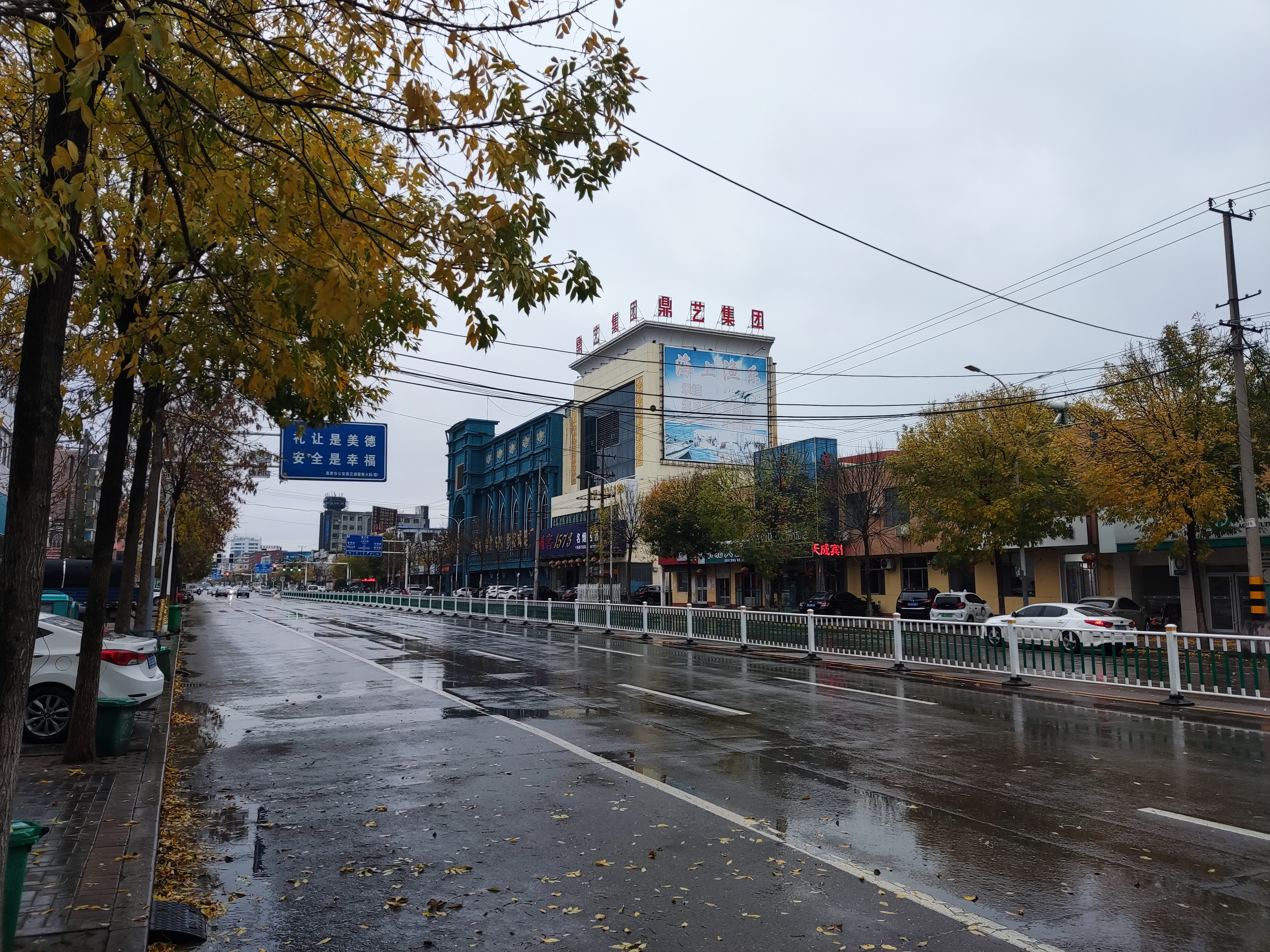
- Liqun Road, Gaomi

- Location in Shandong
- Coordinates: 36°23′N 119°45′E
- Country: People's Republic of China
- Province: Shandong
- Prefecture-level city: Weifang

Area
  - Total: 1,526.63 km^{2} (589.44 sq mi)

Population (2018)
  - Total: 896,444
  - Density: 587.204/km^{2} (1,520.85/sq mi)
- Time zone: UTC+8 (China Standard)
- Postal code: 261500
- Area code: 0536

Gaomi (Chinese: 高密市; pinyin: Gāomì Shì) is a county-level city of eastern Shandong province, China, under the administration of Weifang City. It is the hometown of writer and 2012 Nobel Prize in Literature winner Mo Yan, who has set some of his stories in the region.

== Administrative divisions ==
Gaomi has three subdistricts and seven towns under its administration.

Subdistricts:

- Chaoyang Subdistrict (朝阳街道)
- Liquan Subdistrict (醴泉街道)
- Mishui Subdistrict (密水街道)

Towns:

- Baicheng (柏城镇)
- Xiazhuang (夏庄镇)
- Jiangzhuang (姜庄镇)
- Damoujia (大牟家镇)
- Kanjia (阚家镇)
- Jinggou (井沟镇)
- Chaigou (柴沟镇)

== Climate ==
Climate data for Gaomi, elevation 52 m (171 ft), (1991–2020 normals, extremes 1981–present)
Month	Jan	Feb	Mar	Apr	May	Jun	Jul	Aug	Sep	Oct	Nov	Dec	Year
Record high °C (°F)	16.3 (61.3)	24.0 (75.2)	29.7 (85.5)	34.1 (93.4)	39.6 (103.3)	40.8 (105.4)	40.8 (105.4)	37.8 (100.0)	38.4 (101.1)	33.0 (91.4)	26.8 (80.2)	18.9 (66.0)	40.8 (105.4)
Mean daily maximum °C (°F)	3.7 (38.7)	7.1 (44.8)	13.2 (55.8)	19.9 (67.8)	25.6 (78.1)	29.5 (85.1)	31.3 (88.3)	30.4 (86.7)	27.1 (80.8)	21.1 (70.0)	13.0 (55.4)	5.8 (42.4)	19.0 (66.2)
Daily mean °C (°F)	−1.3 (29.7)	1.5 (34.7)	6.9 (44.4)	13.5 (56.3)	19.4 (66.9)	23.6 (74.5)	26.5 (79.7)	25.8 (78.4)	21.7 (71.1)	15.4 (59.7)	7.8 (46.0)	1.0 (33.8)	13.5 (56.3)
Mean daily minimum °C (°F)	−4.8 (23.4)	−2.5 (27.5)	2.4 (36.3)	8.6 (47.5)	14.4 (57.9)	19.1 (66.4)	23.0 (73.4)	22.4 (72.3)	17.5 (63.5)	11.0 (51.8)	3.9 (39.0)	−2.5 (27.5)	9.4 (48.9)
Record low °C (°F)	−16.3 (2.7)	−13.1 (8.4)	−8.7 (16.3)	−2.6 (27.3)	2.9 (37.2)	9.9 (49.8)	15.7 (60.3)	13.1 (55.6)	6.4 (43.5)	−1.0 (30.2)	−10.0 (14.0)	−14.7 (5.5)	−16.3 (2.7)
Average precipitation mm (inches)	8.4 (0.33)	14.8 (0.58)	15.4 (0.61)	32.6 (1.28)	51.3 (2.02)	73.4 (2.89)	152.3 (6.00)	174.2 (6.86)	59.5 (2.34)	28.6 (1.13)	26.0 (1.02)	11.3 (0.44)	647.8 (25.5)
Average precipitation days (≥ 0.1 mm)	2.7	3.3	3.7	5.4	6.8	7.7	11.6	11.3	6.9	5.1	5.0	3.9	73.4
Average snowy days	3.9	3.1	1.3	0.1	0	0	0	0	0	0	0.9	2.8	12.1
Average relative humidity (%)	62	60	56	57	61	68	77	79	71	66	65	63	65
Mean monthly sunshine hours	162.9	164.3	212.5	225.1	247.1	209.5	173.9	180.9	198.1	194.0	161.7	161.9	2,291.9
Percentage possible sunshine	53	53	57	57	56	48	39	44	54	56	53	54	52
Source: China Meteorological Administration all-time extreme temperature
