= Red Sorghum (novel) =

Chinese language 1986 novel by Mo Yan

- First edition (Chinese)
- Author: Mo Yan
- Original title: 红高粱家族 Hong Gao Liang Jia Zu
- Translator: Howard Goldblatt (1993)
- Language: Chinese
- Set in: 20th-century Shandong
- Publication date: 1986/1987
- Publication place: China

Red Sorghum: A Novel of China (simplified Chinese: 红高粱家族; traditional Chinese: 紅高粱家族; pinyin: Hóng Gāoliáng Jiāzú; lit. 'red sorghum family') is a Chinese-language novel by Mo Yan. Its five parts were published serially in various magazines in 1986 and republished together as a single novel in 1987. It was Mo's first novel and remains one of his best-known works.

The novel is a compilation of five novellas: "Red Sorghum", "Sorghum Wine", "Dog Ways", "Sorghum Funeral", and "Strange Death". "Red Sorghum" was published in People's Literature (Issue 3, 1986), "Dog Ways" was published in the April 1986 issue of Shiyue ("October" magazine); "Sorghum Wine" in the July 1986 issue of PLA Arts, "Sorghum Funeral" in the August 1986 issue of Beijing Wenxue and "Strange Death" in the November–December issue of Kunlun magazine. The novel was translated from the Chinese by Howard Goldblatt in 1993 as Red Sorghum: A Novel of China, but has also been referred to as "The Red Sorghum Clan" in some sources.

Red Sorghum's plot revolves around three generations of the Shandong family between 1923 and 1976. The narrator tells the story of his family's struggles, first as distillery owners making sorghum wine and then as resistance fighters during the Second Sino-Japanese War. The novel also details civil disputes between warring Chinese groups, including rival gangs and political powers. The book also refers to the Cultural Revolution and the 1972 resumption of diplomatic relations between China and Japan. As the principal crop of Shandong province's Northeast Gaomi Township (the author's hometown), red sorghum (sorghum bicolor) frames the narrative as a symbol of indifference and vitality. Amidst decades of bloodshed and death, it grows steadfast to provide food, shelter, wine and life.

Mo Yan employs a terse style in the novel that is characterized by brevity and non-chronological storytelling written in the first-person. The work contains elements of folk-tale that blend into myth and superstition, placing it in the magic-realist genre.

== Adaptations ==
The novel was read by director Zhang Yimou, who proposed to Mo Yan to make two of the sections ("Red Sorghum" and "Sorghum Wine") into a film. In 1988, the resulting film Red Sorghum was presented during the competition and won the Golden Bear at the Berlin Film Festival.

In 2014, it was adapted as a TV series, directed by Zheng Xiaolong.

Excerpts of the novel were included in the 2016 Chinese literature anthology The Big Red Book of Modern Chinese Literature edited by Yunte Huang.
