= Red Sorghum (film) =

1988 Chinese film

- Chinese movie poster
- Traditional Chinese: 紅高粱
- Simplified Chinese: 红高粱
- Literal meaning: red sorghum
- Hanyu Pinyin: Hóng gāoliáng
- Directed by: Zhang Yimou
- Written by: Chen Jianyu; Zhu Wei
- Based on: Red Sorghum Clan by Mo Yan
- Produced by: Wu Tianming
- Starring: Gong Li; Jiang Wen; Teng Rujun
- Cinematography: Gu Changwei
- Edited by: Du Yuan
- Music by: Zhao Jiping
- Production company: Xi'an Film Studio
- Release date: 15 February 1988
- Running time: 91 minutes
- Country: China
- Language: Mandarin
- Box office: 40 million tickets (China)

Red Sorghum is a 1988 Chinese film about a young woman's life working in a sorghum liquor distillery. It is based on the first two parts of the novel Red Sorghum by Nobel laureate Mo Yan.

The film marked the directorial debut of internationally acclaimed filmmaker Zhang Yimou, and the acting debut of film star Gong Li. With its lush and earthy portrayal of peasant life, it immediately vaulted Zhang to the forefront of the Fifth Generation of Chinese directors. The film won the Golden Bear Award at the Berlin International Film Festival.

== Synopsis ==
The film takes place in a rural village in China's eastern province of Shandong during the Second Sino-Japanese War. It is narrated from the point of view of the protagonist's grandson, who reminisces about his grandmother, Jiu'er. She was a poor girl who was sent by her parents into a pre-arranged marriage with an old man, Li Datou, who owned a sorghum wine distillery and who had leprosy.

As Jiu'er's wedding party crosses a field of sorghum, they are attacked by a bandit. One of the men hired to bear Jiu'er's sedan chair manages to fight off the assailant. After Jiu'er safely reaches the distillery, her rescuer, whom she has been eyeing during the trip, disappears. During Jiu'er's trip back to her parents' village, a bandit with a mask jumps out of the sorghum field and, after chasing down Jiu'er, carries her off into the sorghum stalks. Jiu'er runs away at first, but when the bandit takes off his mask and reveals himself to be her bearer and rescuer, she stops resisting his pursuit and has sex with him.

Upon Jiu'er's return to the distillery, it is discovered that Li Datou has died of mysterious causes, leading many of the distillery's workers to suspect murder. Nothing is proven, however, and since Jiu'er's late husband was without heir, it is she who takes ownership of the distillery, which has recently fallen on hard times. She inspires the workers to take new pride in their wine. Jiu'er's lover (and the narrator's grandfather) arrives in the distillery heavily drunk, loudly insisting that he is going to share her bed. When he enters the bedroom, however, she, embarrassed, tosses him out. The other men on the scene carry him away, sticking him in an empty wine vat where he remains for the next three days. Meanwhile, a group of bandits kidnap Jiu'er, forcing the distillery workers to pay a ransom for her freedom.

After emerging from the vat, the narrator's grandfather witnesses the worn down Jiu'er. He goes to confront the leader of the bandits, demanding to know whether the leader raped Jiu'er. The leader says he did not, because she told him she had already slept with the disease-ridden old man Li Datou. The narrator's grandfather returns, taking out his anger on the workers by urinating into four vats of liquor. To the clan's surprise, the urine somehow makes the liquor taste better than ever. Its product newly improved, the distillery begins to see financial success.

The War begins and Imperial Japanese Army troops invade the area. The Japanese soldiers then torture and kill Jiu'er's friend Luohan, a respected distillery worker. Jiu'er incites the workers to avenge his death. In the early dawn, they hide themselves in the sorghum field, prepared to ambush the Japanese military vehicles the moment they pass by, with explosives made out of wine. While waiting, however, the workers become distracted by hunger. When Jiu'er is informed of this by her young child (the narrator's father), she brings out some lunch for the workers. Arriving just as the Japanese soldiers do, Jiu'er is shot and killed in the chaotic skirmish that ensues, and the explosive traps meant for the Japanese trucks end up killing almost everyone at the scene. Only the narrator's grandfather and father manage to survive the encounter.

== Cast ==
- Gong Li as "My Grandma"
- Jiang Wen as "My Grandpa"
- Ji Chunhua as Sanbao the bandit chieftain
- Teng Rujun as Uncle Luohan

== Style ==
Like Zhang's later film, The Road Home (1999), which is narrated by the main characters' son, Red Sorghum is narrated by the main characters' grandson, but Red Sorghum lacks the flashback framing device of The Road Home (the viewer never sees the narrator).

The cinematography by cinematographer Gu Changwei makes use of rich, intense colors. Zhang himself was a cinematographer prior to his directorial debut, and worked closely with Gu. The use of red showcases the rich vitality of the sorghum fields, as well as the director's personal style.

The film is often considered the prime example of the transitional filmmaking period in China between the Fifth Generation and the more commercialised and entertainment-driven films after the late 1980s and the restructuring of state-owned film studios.

== Analysis and reception ==
Upon its release, Red Sorghum garnered international acclaim, most notably winning the coveted Golden Bear at the 1988 Berlin International Film Festival.

Red Sorghum has an approval rating of 85% on review aggregator website Rotten Tomatoes, based on 13 reviews, and an average rating of 8.1/10.

Roger Ebert said, in his review and synopsis in Chicago Sun-Times, "There is a strength in the simplicity of this story, in the almost fairy-tale quality of its images and the shocking suddenness of its violence, that Hollywood in its sophistication has lost."

Zhang Yimou describes his film as a "bastard" work arising from both his artistic sensibility and popular appeal. According to Zhang's "Director's Statement on Red Sorghum":

As the nation becomes strong and prosperous, the nature of its people is also inspired to develop. The people rely on this spirit just like trees depend on their bark; this is one layer of the film's most practical significance. The sense of legend makes this film attractive. While just one may seem feigned, many together make it real; the bizarre details in this film keep everyone firmly in their seats.

=== Awards ===
- 38th Berlin International Film Festival, 1988
  - Golden Bear Award
- Hundred Flowers Awards, 1988
  - Best Feature
- Golden Rooster Awards, 1988
  - Best Feature
  - Best Cinematography - Gu Changwei
  - Best Sound
  - Best Music - Zhao Jiping
  - Best Director - Zhang Yimou (nominated)
  - Best Actor - Jiang Wen (nominated)
  - Best Art Direction - Yang Gang (nominated)
- Zimbabwe International Film Festival, 1988
  - Best Picture
  - Best Director - Zhang Yimou
  - Best Artistic Achievement
- Sydney Film Festival, 1988
  - Film Critics Award
- Brussels International Film Festival, 1989
  - Belgian French Radio Young Jury Award for Best Picture
- Montreal World Film Festival, 1989
  - Silver Panda
- Hong Kong International Film Festival, 1989
  - Top Ten Chinese Language Films
- German Democratic Republic Filmmakers Award, 1990
  - Annual Award
- Cuba Film Festival, 1990
  - Best Feature Film

=== Accolades ===
- Time Out 100 Best Chinese Mainland Films – #12

== See also ==
- List of submissions to the 61st Academy Awards for Best Foreign Language Film
- List of Chinese submissions for the Academy Award for Best Foreign Language Film
- History of cinema in China
