= Hallucinatory realism =

Term used by critics in describing works of art

Hallucinatory realism has been used with various definitions since at least the 1970s by critics in describing works of art. In some occurrences the term has had connections to the concept of magical realism, although hallucinatory realism is usually more specific to a dream-state. The term occurs in the motivation for Mo Yan's Nobel Prize in Literature.

== History ==
In 1975, Clemens Heselhaus used it to describe the poetry of Annette von Droste-Hülshoff, although it was criticized in a book review as an "oxymoronic" term that did not fully capture the striking imagery of the poems. Professor Elisabeth Krimmer, of the University of California Davis, praised von Droste-Hülshoff's hallucinatory realism, saying that "the transition to the dream world is even more compelling because it is preceded by a detailed description of the natural environment."

In 1981, The Oxford Companion to Twentieth Century Art listed hallucinatory realism as one trend of surrealism—"a careful and precise delineation of detail, yet a realism which does not depict an external reality since the subjects realistically depicted belong to the realm of dream or fantasy."

In 1983, in his paper Halluzinatorischer Realismus (page 183), Burkhardt Lindner defined hallucinatory realism as the attempt to make the bygone present with a documentary factuality and at an Aesthetic enhancement of the reality.

Goethe University Frankfurt professor Burkhardt Lindner discussed it in the paper "Hallucinatory Realism: Peter Weiss' Aesthetics of Resistance, Notebooks, and the Death Zones of Art" (New German Critique, 1983). In this paper about Peter Weiss, Lindner says:

Weiss calls his Trotsky drama "a play that is documentary only in a limited sense, and would rather have take shape as a vision, almost hallucinatory." The expressions vision, hallucination, and schizophrenia should make one suspicious of the claim to true-to-life reproduction. Hallucinatory Realism - this is the attempt to blend the numerous characters into a breadth, an openness, a secret connection, a synchronism and a network of memory into a "We".

Lindner goes on to say "The treatment of hallucinatory realism seeks to achieve a dream-analogous authenticity."

The term occurs in the motivation for Mo Yan's Nobel Prize in Literature. The term is used in four of the five official versions of the press release (English, French, German, and Spanish); however, in the presumably original Swedish version, the term "hallucinatorisk skärpa" ("hallucinatory sharpness") is used instead. The award was announced in Swedish and English.

In a review by Joy Press of the novel My Life as a Fake by Peter Carey, hallucinatory realism is used to describe how the book manages to make imaginary universes feel concrete and believable. In an essay on the filmmaker Maya Deren, the term hallucinatory realism is used in a sentence about making reality and subjectivity indistinguishable. The term hallucinatory realism has also been used by different critics to describe works by the writers Peter Weiss and Tomi Ungerer, Pasolini's film The Gospel According to St Matthew, and the novel Paradise Alley by Kevin Baker.

== See also ==
- Direct and indirect realism – Debate in the philosophy of mind
- Surrealism – International cultural movement (1920s–1950s)
- Magic realism – Style of literary fiction and art
- Realism (arts) – Artistic style of representing subjects realistically
