= Mo Yan =

Chinese author (born 1955)

- 莫言
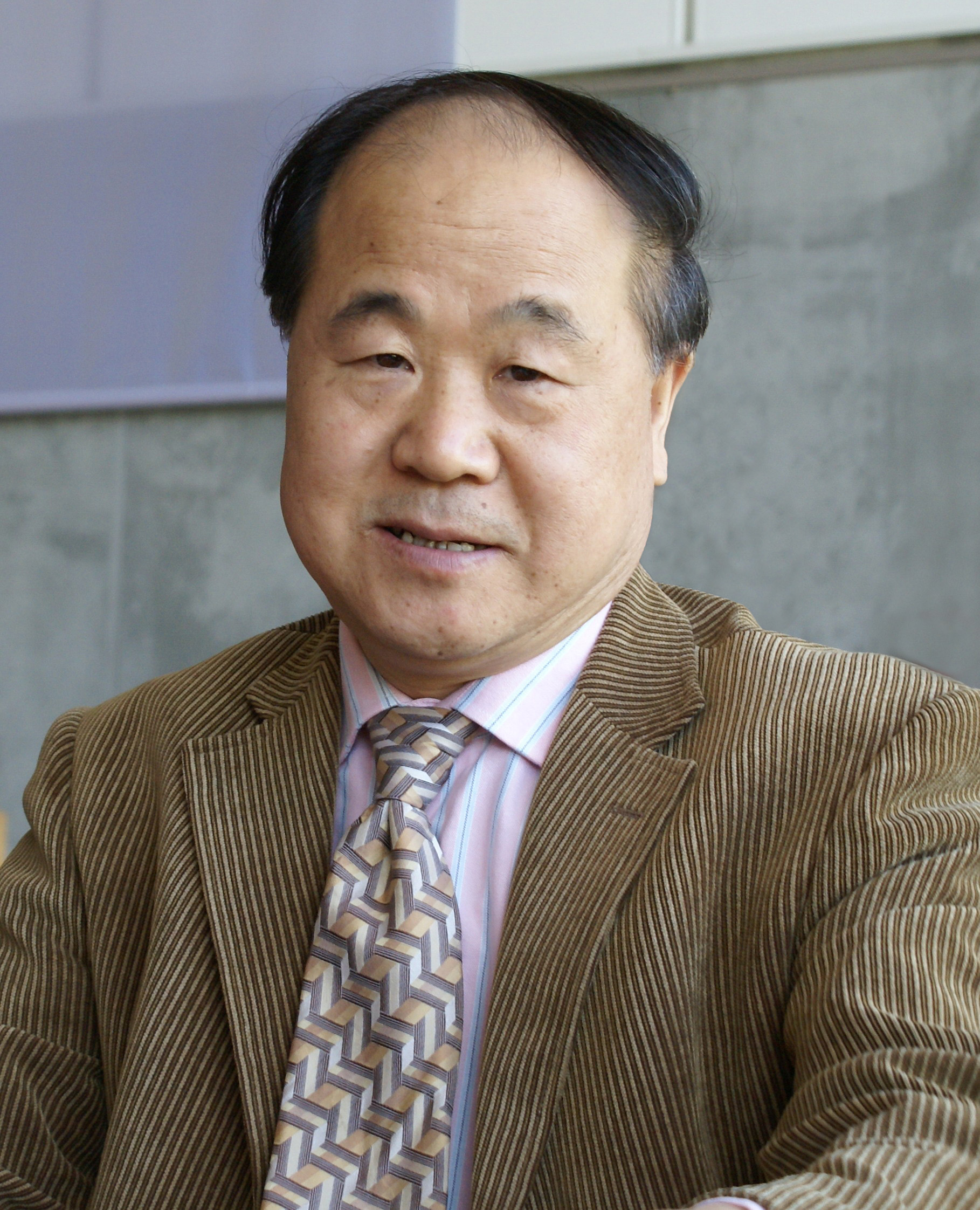
- Mo Yan in 2008
- Born: Guan Moye (管谟业); 17 February 1955 (age 71); Gaomi, Shandong, China
- Education: Beijing Normal University; People's Liberation Army Arts College
- Occupations: Writer, teacher
- Spouse: Du Qinlan (杜勤兰) (m. 1979)
- Children: Guan Xiaoxiao (管笑笑) (Born in 1981)
- Writing career
- Pen name: Mo Yan
- Language: Chinese
- Years active: 1981–present
- Period: Contemporary
- Notable works: Red Sorghum, The Republic of Wine, Life and Death Are Wearing Me Out
- Notable awards: Nobel Prize in Literature; 2012
- Movement: Magical realism

Mo Yan (/moʊ jɛn/), born Guan Moye (simplified Chinese: 管谟业; traditional Chinese: 管謨業; pinyin: Guǎn Móyè; born 5 March 1955), is a Chinese writer. He gained attention for his 1984 novella, A Transparent Radish, and rose to international fame for his 1986 novel Red Sorghum, the first two parts of which were adapted into the Golden Bear-winning film Red Sorghum (1988). In 2012, he was awarded the Nobel Prize in Literature for his work which "with hallucinatory realism merges folk tales, history and the contemporary".

== Name ==
"Mo Yan" (莫言), meaning "don't speak" in Chinese, is the pen name he first adopted when contributing to Lian Chi (莲池), a literary magazine based in Baoding, in 1981, during his years as a PLA soldier stationed there. The sobriquet takes apart the traditional script form of the middle character of his birth name, Mo (謨), and also reflects the repressive political atmosphere he grew up with, when his parents would frequently caution him against speaking freely.

In his early career, as remuneration for his published works was issued under his pen name, collecting payment at the post office each time required obtaining a certified letter bearing an official chop from his work unit; to spare himself the recurring inconvenience, he eventually adopted Mo Yan as his legal name.

== Biography ==
Mo Yan was born as Guan Moye in February 1955 into a peasant family in Ping'an Village, Gaomi Township, northeast of Shandong Province, China. His father received four years of education at a pre-revolutionary private school, with a solid grounding in the Chinese classics. His mother was illiterate. He is the youngest of four children with two older brothers and an older sister. Though far from wealthy, his family was classified as upper-middle peasant during the class struggle campaigns, on account of a plot of land purchased with their life savings.

Facing discrimination from teachers on account of his family's status as a political pariah, and amid a largely dysfunctional curriculum disrupted by the Cultural Revolution, Mo Yan, at 11, withdrew in the fifth grade. His family set him to grazing animals on the grasslands, where, during long stretches of solitude, he taught himself Chinese characters from a Xinhua Dictionary, the only book he had. In the autumn of 1973 he began working at a cotton processing factory, where he encountered a wider world, including a group of sent-down youth from Qingdao whose acquaintance with foreign literature and film left a strong impression on him. Throughout the Maoist era, when virtually all pre-revolutionary and foreign writers were banned save Lu Xun, his reading was narrow and ideologically constrained; yet he grew up immersed in a rich tradition of Chinese folklore and regional opera, which would prove fertile ground for his literary imagination.

Military service had long been a coveted path for rural youths like Mo Yan, one of the few avenues of escape from the countryside, but it had been denied him on account of his family's classification as upper-middle peasant. In early 1976, a friend from the cotton factory, whose father was a local military official, offered to help him enlist. After three years as a cotton worker, Mo Yan successfully enlisted at the end of 1976. When the college entrance examination was restored during his years in the army, he prepared for four months, only to find that the local examination had been cancelled that year. Despite that, working as a librarian for the army, he voraciously read his way through the entire collection of over a thousand books in four years, and began to write.

Mo Yan's early literary model was Sun Li, who was admired for his graceful and lyrical prose style. As translations of foreign literature began circulating in China in the 1980s, Mo Yan, like many Chinese writers of his generation, came under the influence of William Faulkner and Gabriel García Márquez; their magical realism offered him both an expressive idiom and a practical means of navigating censorship.

In 1981, Mo Yan published his first works in a literary magazine Lian Chi based in Baoding, where he was stationed. In 1982, he was promoted and then transferred to the PLA's Joint Staff Department in Beijing. In 1984, he was admitted to the People's Liberation Army Academy of Art on the strength of his short story Folk Music, published in Lian Chi, an imitation of Carson McCullers's The Ballad of the Sad Café. He joined the inaugural cohort of a two-year programme, composed mostly of military cadres recommended for admission, at the Department of Literature newly founded by the novelist Xu Huaizhong (徐怀中), who would become his mentor.

In 1984, Mo Yan published his first novella and claim to literary fame, A Transparent Radish. The story was originally titled A Golden Radish, but was renamed by Xu Huaizhong. Two years later, he published Red Sorghum (1986) at People's Literature to great sensation in the literary circles, and attracted Zhang Yimou to visit him at the PLA Academy of Art to acquire the adaptation rights for what would become Zhang's directorial debut and win the Golden Bear at Berlinale.

In 1987, Mo Yan's novella Joy was published in People's Literature. It fell foul of the ongoing Anti-Bourgeois Liberalization Campaign. The journal's editor-in-chief Liu Xinwu was suspended and placed under investigation, and the issue itself was recalled and destroyed.

In April 1988, Mo Yan published The Garlic Ballads, inspired by an incident in Cangshan, Shandong a year ago, when overproduction, collapsing prices, and predatory market administration fees drove farmers to riot outside the county government building. The novel's sympathetic portrayal of an anti-government riot drew no immediate sanction upon publication, but in the aftermath of the Tiananmen Square crackdown of June 1989 it was banned in mainland China and for a period could only be published in Hong Kong and Taiwan; it was unbanned four years later. The American sinologist Howard Goldblatt, upon reading the novel, was so struck by it that he resolved to begin translating Mo Yan's work, a decision that would prove instrumental in bringing Mo Yan to international audiences.

In the autumn of 1988, Mo Yan enrolled in a postgraduate programme jointly run by the Chinese Writers' Association and Beijing Normal University. During this period he wrote the satirical novel The Republic of Wine, which Goldblatt would later praise as the most imaginative, richly layered, and technically complex Chinese novel he had encountered. In 1991, Mo Yan graduated from Beijing Normal University with a master's degree in literature.

In 1999, Mo Yan, along with Wang Meng and Liu Xinwu, was a referee for an online literature contest hosted by NetEase which contributed to the early growth of internet literature in China.

In 2012, Mo Yan became the first Chinese citizen to receive the Nobel Prize in Literature. Upon his receipt of the Nobel Prize, some writers and artists criticized him for being too close to the authoritarian government of China. A major target of criticism was that months before his win, he was among a group of 100 artists who celebrated the 75th Anniversary of the Yan'an Talks in 2012 by hand copying the text of the talks. Mo stated that he had no regrets for participating in the Yan'an Talks celebration: "I copied it because there is something valid in it; I broke from it because it could no longer satisfy the needs of my creative soul."Another target of criticism was Mo Yan's refusal to sign a petition for the release of Liu Xiaobo, the Chinese dissident and Nobel Peace Prize laureate in 2010. Salman Rushdie, who had not read any of his works, called Mo Yan a "patsy of the regime." At a press conference in Stockholm, Sweden, Mo Yan stated that he hoped Liu would be set free soon while comparing censorship to airport security checks. According to Mo Yan, censorship should not stand in the way of truth, but defamation or rumors should be censored.

In 2016, Mo Yan became the deputy chair of the Chinese Writers Association.

== Works ==
Mo Yan began his career as a writer in the reform and opening up period, publishing dozens of short stories and novels in Chinese. His first published short story was "Falling Rain on a Spring Night", published in September 1981.

In 1986, the five parts that formed his first novel, Red Sorghum (1987), were published serially. It is a non-chronological novel about the generations of a Shandong family between 1923 and 1976. The author deals with upheavals in Chinese history such as the Second Sino-Japanese War, the Chinese Communist Revolution, and the Cultural Revolution, but in an unconventional way; for example from the point of view of the invading Japanese soldiers.

His second novel, The Garlic Ballads, is based on a true story of when the farmers of Gaomi Township rioted against a government that would not buy its crops. The Republic of Wine is a satire around gastronomy and alcohol, which uses cannibalism as a metaphor for Chinese self-destruction, following Lu Xun. Big Breasts & Wide Hips deals with female bodies, from a grandmother whose breasts are shattered by Japanese bullets, to a festival where one of the child characters, Shangguan Jintong, blesses each woman of his town by stroking her breasts. The book was controversial in China because some leftist critics objected to Big Breasts' perceived negative portrayal of Communist soldiers.

Mo Yan wrote Life and Death Are Wearing Me Out in 42 days. He composed the more than 500,000 characters contained in the original manuscript on traditional Chinese paper using only ink and a writing brush. He prefers writing his novels by hand rather than by typing using a pinyin input method, because the latter method "limits your vocabulary". Life and Death Are Wearing Me Out is a meta-fiction about the story of a landlord who is reincarnated in the form of various animals during the Chinese land reform movement. The landlord observes and satirizes Communist society, such as when he (as a donkey) forces two mules to share food with him, because "[in] the age of communism ... mine is yours and yours is mine."

Pow!, Mo Yan's first work to be translated into English after receiving the Nobel Prize, is about a young storytelling boy named Luo who was famous in his village for eating so much meat. His village is so carnivorous it is an obsession that leads to corruption. Pow! cemented his writing style as "hallucinatory realism". Another one of his works, Frog, Yan's latest novel published, focuses on the cause and consequences of China's one-child policy. Set in a small rural Chinese town called Gaomi, the narrator Tadpole tells the story of his aunt Gugu, who once was a hero for delivering life into the world as a midwife, and now takes away life as an abortion provider. Steven Moore from the Washington Post wrote, "another display of Mo Yan's attractively daring approach to fiction. The Nobel committee chose wisely."

== Style ==
Mo Yan's works are epic historical novels characterized by hallucinatory realism and containing elements of black humour. The Nobel Prize Committee which awarded him the 2012 Nobel Prize in literature described his hallucinatory realism as combining "folk tales, history, and the contemporary." His language is distinguished by his imaginative use of colour expressions. A major theme in Mo Yan's works is the constancy of human greed and corruption, despite the influence of ideology. Using dazzling, complex, and often graphically violent images, he sets many of his stories near his hometown, Northeast Gaomi Township in Shandong province.

Mo Yan's works are also predominantly social commentary, and he is strongly influenced by the magical realism of Gabriel García Márquez and the social realism of Lu Xun. Mo Yan says he realised that he could make "[my] family, [the] people I'm familiar with, the villagers" his characters after reading William Faulkner's The Sound and the Fury. He satirizes the genre of socialist realism by placing workers and bureaucrats into absurd situations. In terms of traditional Chinese literature, he is deeply inspired by the folklore-based classical epic novel Water Margin. He cites Journey to the West and Dream of the Red Chamber as formative influences. Mo Yan's writing style has also been influenced by the Six Dynasties, chuanqi, notebook novels of the Ming and Qing dynasties and especially by folk oral literature. His creation combines all of these inspirations into one of the most distinctive voices in world literature.

Mo Yan's ability to convey traditionalist values inside of his mythical realism writing style in The Old Gun has allowed insight and view into the swift modernization of China. This short story by Mo Yan was an exemplary example of the Xungen movement Chinese literary movement and influenced many to turn back to traditional values. This movement portrayed the fear of loss of cultural identity due to the swift modernization of China in the 1980s. Mo Yan reads foreign authors in translation and strongly advocates the reading of world literature. At a speech to open the 2009 Frankfurt Book Fair, he discussed Goethe's idea of "world literature", stating that "literature can overcome the barriers that separate countries and nations".

Mo Yan's writing is characterised by the blurring of distinctions between "past and present, dead and living, as well as good and bad". Mo Yan appears in his novels as a semi-autobiographical character who retells and modifies the author's other stories. His female characters often fail to observe traditional gender roles, such as the mother of the Shangguan family in Big Breasts & Wide Hips, who, failing to bear her husband any sons, instead is an adulterer, becoming pregnant with girls by a Swedish missionary and a Japanese soldier, among others. Male power is also portrayed cynically in Big Breasts & Wide Hips, and there is only one male hero in the novel.

As of 2012, Mo Yan was the most translated author of Chinese literature ever. Mo Yan's masterpieces have been translated into English by translator Howard Goldblatt. Donald Morrison of TIME referred to Mo Yan as "one of the most famous, oft-banned and widely pirated of all Chinese writers", and Jim Leach called him the Chinese answer to Franz Kafka or Joseph Heller.

== List of works ==
=== Novels ===
- 《红高粱家族》 Red Sorghum (1986)
- 《天堂蒜薹之歌》 The Garlic Ballads (1988)
- 《十三步》 Thirteen Steps (1988)
- 《食草家族》 The Herbivorous Family (1993)
- 《酒国》 The Republic of Wine: A Novel (1993)
- 《丰乳肥臀》 Big Breasts & Wide Hips (1995)
- 《红树林》 Red Forest (1999)
- 《檀香刑》 Sandalwood Death (2001). The novel portrays violence and chaos during the Boxer Rebellion.
- 《四十一炮》 Pow! (2003)
- 《生死疲劳》 Life and Death Are Wearing Me Out (2006). The novel chronicles life in a village from land reform to contemporary China, paralleling the protagonist's incarnations from human to animal forms.
- 《蛙》 Frog (2009)

=== Short story and novella collections ===
- 《白狗秋千架》 White Dog and the Swing (30 short stories, 1981–1989)
- 《与大师约会》 Meeting the Masters (45 short stories, 1990–2005)
- 《欢乐》 Joy (8 novellas; six of them are published in English as Explosions and Other Stories)
- 《怀抱鲜花的女人》 The Woman with Flowers (8 novellas, 2012)
- 《师傅越来越幽默》Shifu, You'll Do Anything for a Laugh (9 novellas, 2001; one of them, Change, is published independently in English)
- 《晚熟的人》A Late Bloomer (12 novellas and short stories, 2020)

=== Plays ===
- 《我们的荆轲》 Our Jing Ke (2011)
- 《鳄鱼》Crocodile (2023)

=== Other works ===
- 《会唱歌的墙》 The Wall Can Sing (60 essays, 1981–2011)
- 《碎语文学》 Broken Philosophy (interviews, only available in Chinese)
- 《用耳朵阅读》 Ears to Read (speeches, only available in Chinese)
- 《盛典：诺奖之行》 Grand Ceremony (speeches and interviews) (2013)
- 《莫言墨语》Mo Yan Mo Yu (essays and calligraphy) (2018)
- 《三歌集》Collection of Three Ballads (poems and calligraphy) (2023)
- 《放宽心，吃茶去》Release Your Heart, Sip the Moment (essays from WeChat official account, co-authored with Wang Zhen) (2025)

== Awards and honours ==
- 1998: Neustadt International Prize for Literature, candidate
- 2005: Kiriyama Prize, Notable Books, Big Breasts and Wide Hips
- 2005: International Nonino Prize
- 2005: Doctor of Letters, Open University of Hong Kong
- 2006: Fukuoka Asian Culture Prize XVII
- 2007: Man Asian Literary Prize, nominee, Big Breasts and Wide Hips
- 2009: Newman Prize for Chinese Literature, winner, Life and Death Are Wearing Me Out
- 2010: Honorary Fellow, Modern Language Association
- 2011: Mao Dun Literature Prize, winner, Frog
- 2012: Nobel Prize in Literature

He was won virtually every literary award presented in China.

== Honorary doctorates ==
- 2013: The City University of New York, United States
- 2013: Fo Guang University, Taiwan
- 2014: Sofia University, Bulgaria
- 2014: The Open University of Hong Kong, China
- 2014: The University of Macau, China
- 2017: Hong Kong Baptist University, China

== Adaptations ==
Several of Mo Yan's works have been adapted for film:

- Red Sorghum (1987) (directed by Zhang Yimou)
- The Sun Has Ears (1995) (directed by Yim Ho, adaptation of Grandma Wearing Red Silk)
- Happy Times (2000) (directed by Zhang Yimou, adaptation of Shifu: You'll Do Anything for a Laugh)
- Nuan (2003) (directed by Huo Jianqi, adaptation of White Dog Swing)

== See also ==
- Chinese literature
- List of Nobel laureates in Literature
- List of Chinese writers
