= Guangdong People's Publishing House =

Chinese publishing company

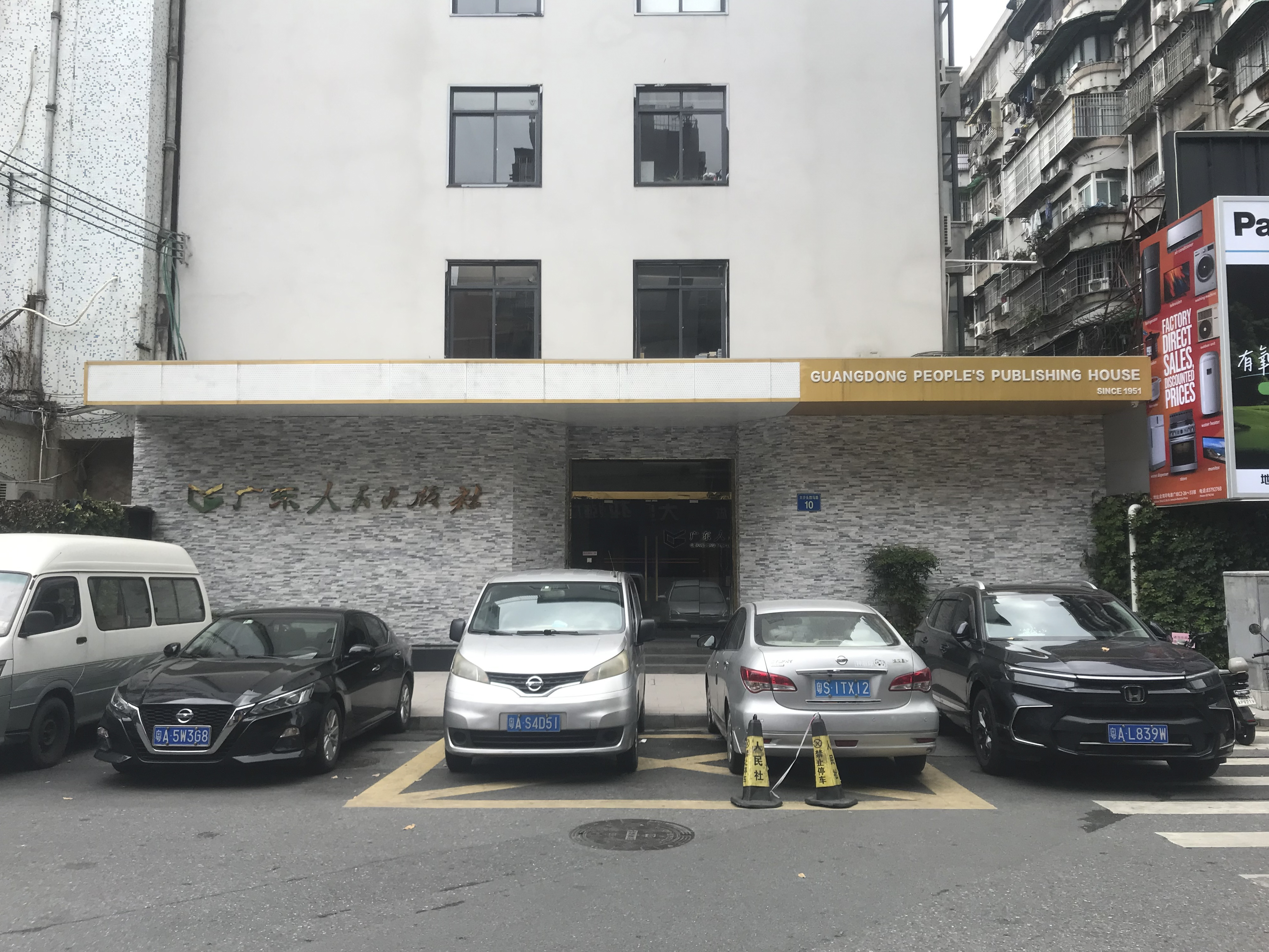
- Founded: 1951
- Country of origin: People's Republic of China
- Headquarters location: No. 10, Road 4, Dashatou, Yuexiu District, Guangzhou City, Guangdong Province
- Publication types: Textbooks, workbooks, and teaching and research magazines for primary and secondary schools in mainland China
- Official website: www.gdpph.com

Guangdong People's Publishing House (GPPH) (simplified Chinese: 广东人民出版社; traditional Chinese: 廣東人民出版社; pinyin: Guǎngdōng Rénmín Chūbǎnshè) is the oldest publishing house in Guangdong Province, China. Established in 1951, it is now one of the most respected comprehensive publishing houses in Guangdong. GPPH mainly publishes high-quality party and government works, academic monographs and popular reading materials on politics, philosophy, ancient books, history, social sciences, economics, etc.

== History ==
In 1951, the "South China Publishing House" was established in Guangzhou.

In 1956 South China Publishing House was renamed "Guangdong People's Publishing House". It was the only publishing house in Guangdong at that time.

Since 1978, Guangdong People's Publishing House has successively branched out Guangdong Science and Technology Press, Lingnan Fine Arts Publishing House, Huacheng Publishing House, Guangdong Education Press, and New Century Publishing House.

In the early 1980s, Guangdong People's Publishing House published the novel "Man, Man!" (人啊，人！), which caused a great response across the country and sold hundreds of thousands of copies in a short period of time.

After that, the publishers of Guangdong People's Publishing House were the first to introduce Hong Kong's new martial arts novels and literary works, and founded a number of excellent magazines such as "Flower City" and "Essays".

After the reform and opening up, Guangdong People's Publishing House published "Guangzhou Phonetic Dictionary". This book is still a best-seller today, with exceeding 4 million copies sold.

In 1991, Guangdong People's Publishing House officially launched the "Lingnan Collection" (岭南文库) large-scale series publishing project. This is the first large-scale regional collection in the country. In 2021, Lingnan Collection had gone through 30 years and has become a well-known book brand in Guangdong, publishing nearly 400 books. It is known as the "Encyclopedia of Cantonese culture".

Other popular books include "General History of the People's Republic of China", "History of Social Life in the Republic of China", "General History of Modern Chinese Literary Studies", "Collection of Rare Hakka Documents"; as well as "Classics Series of World Chinese Masters", "Gravity", "Kaleidoscope", etc.

In 2006, GPPH has been awarded as one of the “pioneering publishing houses in copyright trade” by the State Copyright Bureau.

In 2009, the Dongguan Editorial Center of Guangdong People's Publishing House was established. In 2016, Beijing Arc’teryx Culture Media Co., Ltd., the Beijing branch of Guangdong People’s Publishing House, was established in Beijing.

As of the end of 2019, the company's total assets were nearly 300 million yuan, its net profit in 2019 exceeded 30 million yuan, and there were more than 250 employees.

On April 7, 2023, the unveiling ceremony of the Guangdong People’s Publishing House Dongguan Publishing and Cultural Creativity Center was held in Dongguan.

== Current situation ==
At present, the company has total assets of 300 million, with 10 content production departments. There are independent editorial departments working mainly at Social Science, History, Politics, Culture, Education, etc.

== Honours ==
GPPH has won the National Book Award, the Five-Ones Project Award and the China Book Award, and has been honored as “Good Publishing House” by the General Administration of Press (GAP) many times. GPPH is also one of the “pioneering publishing houses in copyright trade” awarded by the State Copyright Bureau.

Guangdong People's Publishing House have published tens of thousands of different kinds of books in the past 70 years. More than 900 titles have won national and provincial awards.
