= Huacheng Publishing House =

Chinese publishing company

Huacheng Publishing House (Chinese: 花城出版社; pinyin: Huāchéng Chūbǎnshè), or Flower City Publishing House, is the only professional literary and artistic publishing house in Guangdong Province, China. Established in Guangzhou in January 1981, the publishing house has published a wide variety of titles covering fiction and non-fiction, poems, proses, as well as translation works. It is also known for its children’s books.

== History ==
Huacheng Publishing House was founded in 1981, named after Qin Mu's famous work "Huacheng" and the magazine "Flower City", which was founded two years earlier in 1979.

In the 1980s and 1990s, Huacheng Publishing House led the reading trends of Qian Zhongshu, avant-garde literature, Wang Xiaobo, martial arts literature, Qiong Yao, etc.

In the new century, it has published many first-time novels by famous writers, such as Wang Meng's "The Scenery Here", Li Peifu's "The Plain Guest", Zhang Ling's "Tangshan Earthquake", etc. "The Scenery Here" won the 9th Mao Dun Literature Prize;

Since the selection of "China Good Books" began in 2013, Huacheng Publishing House has been the regional (except Beijing) publishing house winning the most honors, a total of six books winning awards in seven years.

The book "Struggle and Glory - Narrative History of Guangdong's Well-off Society" is the first panoramic historical record in China. "Zhong Nanshan: The People Are Above All" was selected into the "Excellent Realistic Literature Publishing Project" of the Central Propaganda Department in 2020.

In recent years, Huacheng Publishing House has launched books with the same name as movies and TV series with great social influence, such as "The Ming Dynasty 1566", "No War in Peking", "Little Farewell", "Little Joy", "Little Sacrifice", and "Little Painful Love". The magazines "Huacheng" and "Suibi" (Essays and Sketches) sponsored by the publishing house have become cultural landmarks in Guangdong.

In 2023, Flower City Academy of Literature was established, integrating the resources of the Flower City Publishing House. Since then, it has hosted many literary events, becoming a new cultural landmark in the Guangdong-Hong Kong-Macao Greater Bay Area.

== Address ==
5th-7th Floor, No. 11, Shuiyin Road, Huanshi East, Yuexiu District, Guangzhou, China

Official website: www.aihuacheng.com
