= Flower City (magazine) =

Chinese literary magazine

- Frequency: Bimonthly
- First issue: July 1979
- Country: China
- Based in: Guangzhou
- Language: Chinese
- ISSN: 1000-789X

Flower City (Chinese: 花城; pinyin: Huāchéng), or Huacheng, is a Chinese bimonthly literary magazine founded in Guangzhou in 1979. It mainly publishes medium-length and long-length novels, as well as works of other genres. Flower City is the only large-scale pure literature journal in Guangdong Province, and has been listed as one of the Four Famous Dan Chinese literary journals along with Harvest, Shiyue and Dangdai. It is also hailed as the "cradle of avant-garde literature" in China.

== Etymology ==
The title of the magazine is taken from Qin Mu's famous book "The City of Flower", which tells the various stories that took place in Guangzhou of southern China. And "Flower City" has become a nickname of Guangzhou, the birthplace of the magazine.

== History ==
The Flower City magazine was founded in Guangzhou in April 1979. The first printing reached 200,000 copies.

At the beginning of its publication, Flower City mainly focused on the literature of Guangdong, South China and overseas Chinese. In the first issue, Zeng Minzhi's article "A Glimpse of Chinese Literature in Hong Kong, Macao and Southeast Asian" was the first introduction to Chinese literature outside the mainland after the Cultural Revolution, and became a landmark literary event. The subsequent launch of columns such as "Hong Kong Literary Works", "Overseas Trends", "Foreign Literature", "Interview Notes", "Hong Kong Communications", and "Selected Taiwan Works" broadened the horizons of the new generation of writers who had just emerged from the Cultural Revolution and promoted the formation of new thinking and expression methods. At the same time, through Flower City, overseas Chinese writers and readers can also understand the literary situation in mainland China. In the first two years, it was published in the form of a series (books instead of magazines), with a total of 7 issues.

At the end of 1980, the editors-in-chief of 27 literary magazines across the country held a meeting at Jinshan Temple in Zhenjiang of Jiangsu Province, including most of the major magazines. At the meeting, some people proposed the title of Four Famous Dans, believing that the Flower City Magazine was "graceful and charming" and could be called the "Flower Dan".

In January 1981, the Flower City Publishing House was established and began to publish regularly the bimonthly literary magazine.

In 1982, the first issue of Flower City published Yu Luojin's "Spring Fairy Tale", which caused great controversy. The editorial department was forced to publish a critical article and self-examination in the third issue. The editor-in-chief and deputy editor-in-chief were transferred from their positions, and all editorial staff underwent three months of self-examination. Later, the storm was calmed down with the mediation of Ren Zhongyi, the First Party Secretary of Guangdong. The quality of the articles in the next two issues declined significantly, but Flower City also attracted attention from the literary world for its courage to try.

In 1983, the "Flower City Literature Award" was established to select the winning works since its founding and publish them the following year.

1984 can be regarded as the first year that Flower City made pioneering explorations in literature. In 1984, Flower City mainly focused on novellas, publishing a total of 33 novellas throughout the year. Among them, Zhang Jie's "Emerald", Zhang Xiaotian's "The Man Who Missed the Sun and the Stars", Liu Xinwu's "The Daily Schedule", and Liu Xihong's "The Moon, Shaking Forward" all caused a strong response among readers and brought Flower City to the attention of the Chinese literary community. The openness and inclusiveness of Guangdong culture and the ideological trend of pursuing freedom and liberation in the south during the early period of reform and opening up also allowed Flower City magazine to incorporate experimental and diverse elements into its style. In the late 1980s, Flower City published a number of documentary and reportage works that reflected reality and boldly exposed social problems, such as Lu Yao's "Ordinary World", Li Shifei's "Hot-blooded Man", "After the Redemption", and Zhao Yu's "The Fracture of Taihang Mountain".

After entering the 1990s, under the tide of commodity economy, literature gradually became marginalized and the market for literary magazines deteriorated. Unlike some other literary journals, Flower City did not change its focus to popular literature, or to become a cultural journal or a comprehensive journal. Instead, it turned to the position of a pure literature journal. Compared with the 1980s, when Flower City proposed "text reform", it paid more attention to personalized literature and literary exploration under the spirit of freedom and innovation. It boldly accepted and published a series of avant-garde literary works, such as Su Tong's "My Imperial Career", Bei Cun's "The Baptizing River", Chen Ran's "Private Life", Bi Feiyu's "Qingyi", etc. Flower City encouraged the exploration of novel forms and the pursuit of "conscious text consciousness". In 1998, Flower City launched the "Experimental Text Series", which clearly presented the avant-garde and experimental literary concepts to the literary world for the first time. Starting from the first issue in 1999, Flower City officially established the "Experimental Text" column to encourage various experimental works.

As of October 2012, Flower City has published 198 issues. The highest circulation was 650,000 copies of a single issue.

The publishing philosophy of Flower City has led to the publication of many influential writers' debuts and masterpieces, such as Wang Xiaobo's "Trilogy of the Times", Lin Bai's "Flowers of Everything" and "One Man's War", Chen Ran's "Private Life", Han Dong's "Rooting", Bi Feiyu's "Qingyi", Li Er's "Flower Tone", Dongxi's "Loud Slap", etc. This is not only due to Flower City's emphasis on literary exploration, but also from its strong support for young writers and newcomers. The Flower City Magazine has long opened a special column to publish works by young writers and local Guangdong writers in order to encourage them and allow many new writers' works to quickly enter the literary world's field of vision.

In 2023, Flower City Academy of Literature was established. The purpose is to encourage and guide writers and critics to create and promote literary works with Guangdong characteristics and southern China style, especially the style of Guangdong–Hong Kong–Macao Greater Bay Area.

In August 2024, the 45th anniversary of the Flower City Magazine and the 8th Flower City Literature Award Ceremony were held in Guangzhou. One of the activities was the "Reshaping the Communication and Leadership of Literary Journals - National Famous Journal Editors Exchange Meeting".

== Flower City and famous writers ==
Flower City has published important works by famous writers including Wang Meng, Mo Yan, Yu Hua, and Can Xue. In addition, it has discovered and introduced a group of influential writers including Lu Yao, Wang Xiaobo, Zhou Meisen, Bi Feiyu and Lin Bai.
