= International rankings of South Africa =

National rating on multiple scales

International rankings of South Africa

== Agriculture ==
- Wine production ranked 9 in 2011
- Corn production ranked 10 in 2012

== Demographics ==
- Population ranked 25

== Economy ==
- GDP ranked 29 by the UN

== Geography ==
- Total area ranked 25

== Politics ==
- Transparency International Corruption Perceptions Index 2013 ranked 72 out 177

== Technology ==
- World Intellectual Property Organization: Global Innovation Index 2026, ranked 63 out of 139 countries
