= The Seat on the Verandah =

1995 short story by Lin Bai

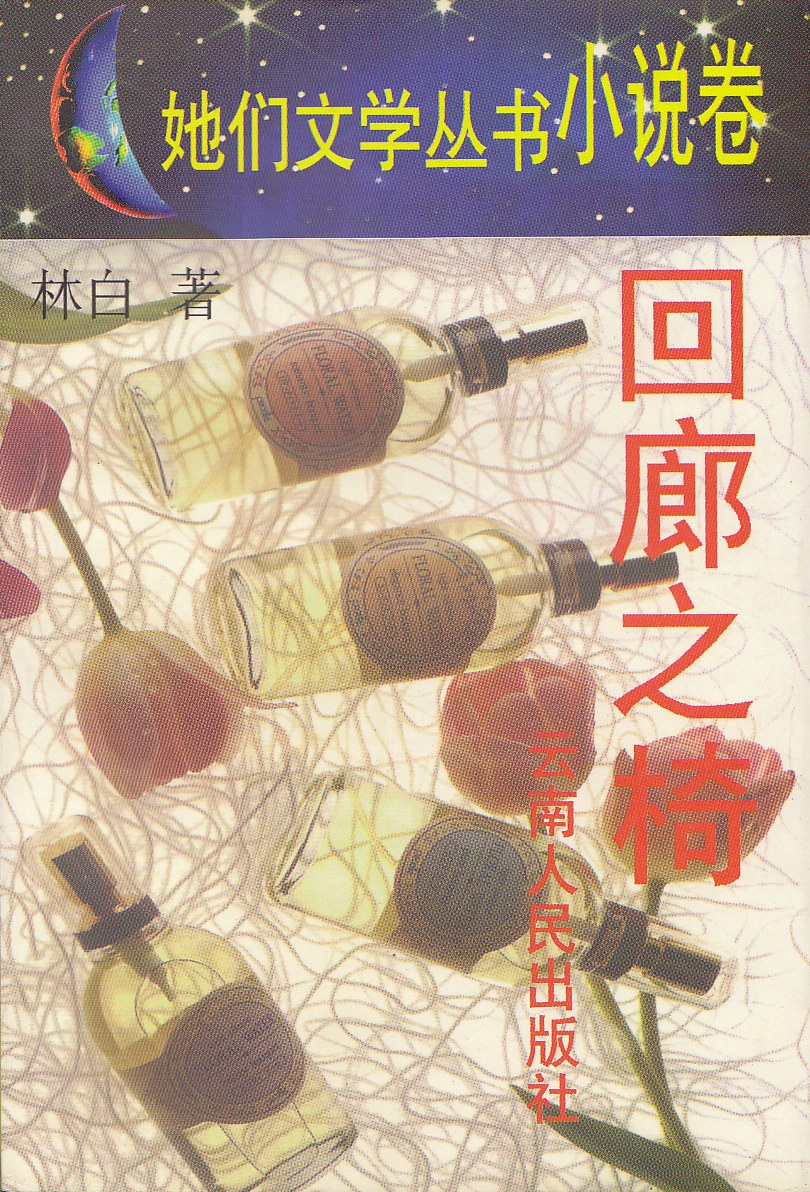
- First edition cover
- Author: Lin Bai
- Original title: 回廊之椅
- Subject: Feminism, women, literature
- Publisher: Yunnan People's Publishing House, China
- Publication date: August 1995
- Publication place: China
- Pages: 321 (Yunnan People's Publishing House first edition)
- ISBN: 978-7-222-01824-2

The Seat on the Verandah (Simplified Chinese characters: 回廊之椅) is a short story by Chinese writer Lin Bai (Mandarin Chinese: 林白). The story was first published by Yunnan People's Publishing House (云南人民出版社) in 1995. Set during the Northern Expedition, the story focuses on the narrator's ambivalent feelings toward homoeroticism and female sexuality. It is a demonstration of Lin Bai's take on the Chinese heteronormative ideas that were prevalent during the post-Mao era. Through the themes of female sexuality, homoeroticism and homophobia, the story covers a period where views on same sex love were slowly changing; it is a critique of the historical erasure of female sexuality and same-sex love under the name of Communism.

== Plot ==
The Seat on the Verandah is a written in a non-linear fashion and takes place in a fictional town called Water Mill (水磨), which lies on the twenty-third parallel. The mention of a river that runs from Water Mill to Vietnam suggests the story takes place in southern China.

The story is narrated by an unknown woman who recounts her adventures in Water Mill about 10 years earlier. At that time, the young woman was travelling right after her college graduation and happened to pass by the town of Water Mill in 1982 on a sightseeing trip in the southwest.

October 23, 1982. The narrator arrives in Water Mill, and having to stay in town until the temperature gets warmer, she decides to explore the town. Upon finding a mansion, she climbs the stairs until she reaches the third floor, where she meets an elderly woman named Qiye (七叶) or Seven Leaves. The meeting with Qiye marks the second part of the story where the reader learns about the old woman's past. Qiye lived in the Zhang household, where she fulfilled the role of maid for Zhu Liang (朱凉), "the third mistress at the Zhang household". Zhu Liang was often described as an incomparable beauty "her body was supple and curvaceous, and her face radiated beauty". At that time, the wealthy Zhang family with the head of the family Zhang Meng Da, was accused of being anti-revolutionaries during the Northern Expedition. This led to the execution of Zhang Meng Da and the disappearance of Zhu Liang. From Qiye, the narrator learns about how life was during the time of the Chinese Communist Revolution at the mansion. At one point during their conversation, Qiye mentions that the narrator shares the same eyes as Zhu Liang, which makes the young woman feel nauseous. Qiye then tells her to lie down, and burns some herbs to ease her discomfort. After realizing that she got sick from the flu, the narrator rents a room in a small hotel while she recovers. During her sickness, the narrator falls into a delirium where she dreams about the mummified body of Zhu Liang in the mansion. Fearing to be struck by "gu" if she stays any longer, she boards a cargo train the next morning and leaves Water Mill.

== Context ==
Although the story took place during the revolution with a political narrative, it does not stray from the experience of the narrator and her reactions to Qiye and Zhu Liang's intimate relationship. This bond they share exemplified Lin Bai's choice to take on heteronormative narratives that were prevalent at the time by prioritizing a marginalized form of female sexual desire and emotional experience over a masculine political and national narrative.

The Seat on the Verandah's plot situates itself in the period of the Chinese Communist Revolution and the era that experiences its aftermath. During the Chinese Communist Revolution, there was a dismissal of homosexuality, especially female sexuality, which is demonstrated with this passage in the short story: "Zhu Liang and Qiye might have been free to love each other before the Revolution, but the narrator, a daughter of the Revolution, finds their relationship shocking and slightly repulsive". This explains why the narrator seems disturbed by the idea of showing her own naked body to other women in public showers. As a "daughter of the Revolution", the narrator is fearful and uncomfortable with the overbearing closeness of Qiye and Zhu Liang's relationship.

== Themes ==
=== Female sexuality and homoeroticism ===
Coming from the South, the narrator went to college in "the northern region of the Chinese heart-land". The first two years of her studies, she could not even bathe herself with other women in the bathhouse due to her fear of the naked female body:

"I hugged my shoulders tightly and looked in her direction. What struck my eyes were a soft and sagging belly and two huge breasts, which she was at the moment rubbing with her hands. I suddenly felt like hiding under a rock".

The narrator is visibly bothered by the naked female body, underlined by the dismissal of homosexuality and female sexuality during the era of the revolution. Thus, when Qiye recounts her experiences bathing Zhu Liang, the narrator cannot help but wonder how she was so comfortable exposing her naked body in front of other women "having come from [her] hometown and lived some forty years ago", she assumes that "she must have had to fight against something deep inside herself—fear perhaps—and, in that way, experienced stimulation and pleasure". The descriptions of Qiye giving Zhu Liang a bath are filled with an atmosphere of eroticism and tenderness. Fragrances, soft hisses, the lining of the shape of bodies: "After drying her face, she would submerge her breast in the copper wash basin, sucking in her breath with soft hisses. Then, she would change into a soft, oversized silk blouse, the curvaceous shape of her firm, lithe body faintly visible in the billows of the blouse". This passage demonstrates how the narrator can identify herself in Zhu Liang in some ways, an experience that terrifies and fascinates her at the same time. The narrator thinks that "it is hard to imagine such close relationship between two women".

=== Homophobia and internalized fear ===
After Qiye had told her stories about her life at the Zhang mansion, the narrator asked Qiye if the woman in the black-and-white photograph beside the pillow was her. Upon learning that it was not, Qiye's reply 'immediately sent a strong message to [her], the import of which seemed extraordinary but which I could not put into words". This contrast from her opinion on the photograph if Qiye was a man instead: "if Seven Leaves had been a grimly old man, surely I wouldn't have been so startled by the sight of a woman's photography by his pillow". Following this conversation, the narrator felt discomfort which was amplified when confronted with the question about where she came from, the narrator displays unease and is afraid to admit that she is from Bobai, which also happens to be Zhu Liang's hometown. She was "afraid that [she] would unwittingly be stepping into a trap". It seems like she is frightened by the idea that Qiye might somewhat see a piece of Zhu Liang in her. Their shared intimacy makes her uncomfortable and renders her incapable of understanding the relationship that they shared.

=== Duality ===
In The Seat on the Verandah, there are several concepts that highlight the existence of duality, of opposites. There's notably the opposition of "nüxing" (女性, female) and "nanxing" (男性, male), painting one as beautiful and the other, as ugly. This translates into the space where the story takes in, with the Zhang mansion as a safe haven, separate from the cruelty and chaos of the outside world: "The story sets up the old mansion as the border separating outside/inside, that is, two opposite worlds. The former is masculine, political and teeming with conflict and murder, while the latter is feminine, sensual, and pregnant with the essence of solitude and beauty". Not only does Lin Bai associate beauty and ugliness to "nüxing" (女性) and "nanxing" (男性), she also expresses appreciation for the former and disgust for the latter. Through beautiful and detailed descriptions of Zhu Liang, and even Qiye, the maid, the feminine is being admired. This contrasts with the description of "ruddy faced" Zhang Meng Da or Chen Nong: "the lower half of his body felt chilled, stale and constipated". Fragrances also play a role in representing the dichotomy between the feminine and the masculine. Pleasant scents are always surrounding the women such as Zhu Liang, "a certain fragrance that comes from beautiful women when they are sound asleep", whereas "the pungent smell of grain" and "the stale smell of old grain" trail the men like Chen Nong. The men are always portrayed as grotesque, vulgar and boring, full of ill intentions.

=== Nostalgia ===
The story starts with a detailed description of Zhu Liang's photograph. The owner of that photograph, Qiye, explains that the frame of the picture doesn't belong to her with a voice "filled with deep nostalgia, like that of a doddering man remembering an undying love from his youth so beautiful and tragic he has never been able to forget it". When the narrator meets Qiye, her appearance seems to ignite something in the old woman, which prompts Qiye to question her about where she came from. The appearance of the narrator throws Qiye back to a nostalgic state; according to the narrator it was as if "Seven Leaves regarded me as someone with a mysterious link to Zhu Liang—a stranger who, on a predestined day (drizzly, perfect for nostalgia), showed up from a faraway place". Qiye and Zhu Liang first met at the bran market, an encounter that marked the pivotal point to Qiye's life. From that moment on, Qiye dedicated her life to serve Zhu Liang until the moment Zhang Meng Da's anti-revolutionary plot was revealed; Zhu Liang disappears and Qiye spends the rest of her life remembering someone whom she shared a tender relationship with.

== Reception and cultural impact ==
Lin Bai opens up a discussion with The Seat on the Verandah in the emerging discourse of female homoeroticism post-Mao era in the 1990s where views on same sex love were slowly shifting. She inspired many others to use this subversive genre of writing on intimacy to inspect society at the time. Challenging pre-existing projections of female sexuality and patriarchal ideals, this short story is connected to the social, political, and historical spheres of Chinese society and provides a social commentary on these views and ideals.

Lin Bai in her book Fatal Flight Zhìmìng de fēixiáng (致命的飞翔), admits that The Seat on the Verandah, has been her favorite work of hers among those that she wrote these past few years. She says that among her friends that are poets or those who like poetry in general share her opinion on the short-story, stating that it is better than Water in the Vase (Píng zhōng zhī shuǐ, 瓶中之水), although editors and readers seems to prefer the latter.

Chinese scholar Chen Sihe responded to Lin Bai's writings in The Seat on the Verandah, arguing that "Lin's subject matter is admittedly 'profane' (weixie) and 'puzzling' (kunhuo)", she added nuance to her argument by stating that her subject matter was "'purified (jinghua) and redeemed by the beauty of her language and also by the radical awakening of 'female consciousness' (nü xing yi shi) represented in the text". This said 'radical awakening of female consciousness' in question can be illustrated with the intimate that Seven Leaves or Qiye had with Zhu Liang. They pleasure each other, comfort each other, "the two women satisfy each other's feminine urges for sex and life".

In a recent interview with Lin Bai (林白) on July 3, 2020 for the Italian Manifesto, the interviewer asked about what inspired the author to write The Seat on the Verandah. To this question, Lin Bai replied that this short novel had nothing to do with her personal experience; during one of her travels to Yunnan, she passed by a mansion which she heard used to be owned by a big landlord. Upon entering the property, she noticed two pillars that contained Marxist sayings which were part of the communist ideology. With these, she came up with the novel. Everything from the plot of the story to the characters are fictional she says.

== See also ==
- Lin Bai

== Bibliography ==
Citations

Bibliography

Bai, Lin (2020). "Lin Bai e le registrazioni di chiacchiere femminili", Interview by Ricardo Moretto. The Manifesto, 4 July 2020, Retrieved from Lin Bai e le registrazioni di chiacchiere femminili

Bai, Lin 林白 (2001). Zhìmìng de fēixiáng 致命的飞翔, Wu Han武汉, Changjiang Literature and Art Publishing House 长江文艺出版社, 349.

Chen, Si He. "Lin Bai lun" 林柏伦, 252.

Jiao, Lan Zhou. Jìjìng yǔ shī xìng de shūxiě —shì lùn lín bái de "huíláng zhī yǐ" 寂静与诗性的书写 [Quiet and poetic writing—On Lin Bai's "The Seat on the Verandah"]. Jiang Su. China Academic Journal Electronic Publishing House, 95-96

Liang, Shi Yong. Jiědú lín bái de "huíláng zhī yǐ" 解读林白的《回廊之椅》[Interpretation of Lin Bai's "The Seat on the Verandah"]. Wénxué jiàoyù 文学教育，2013, 126-128

Lin Bai, & Ying, H. (2003). The Seat on the Verandah. Manoa, 15(2), 83-109. Retrieved February 18, 2021, from JSTOR 4230237

Mangan, Ashley. "Imagining Female Tongzhi: The Social Significance of Female Same-sex desire Desire in Contemporary Chinese Literature" (2014). Asian Languages and Cultures Honors Projects. Paper 2. 46-51 https://digitalcommons.macalester.edu/cgi/viewcontent.cgi?article=1001&context=asian_honors

Tze Lan Sang. 2003. "Lin Bai's narratives of female homoerotic desire" in The Emerging Lesbian (Chicago: Chicago University Press): 175-199
