= San Huan =

San Huan may refer to:

- 3rd Ring Road, a city ring road that encircles the centre of the city of Beijing.
- Three Huans, three noble families during the Spring and Autumn period in the Chinese history.
- Guangxi Sanhuan, a Chinese ceramics manufacturer.

== See also ==
- San Juan
