= A War of One's Own =

Chinese 1994 novel

- Author: Lin Bai
- Original title: 一个人的战争
- Subject: Feminism, autobiographical fiction, female homoeroticism, chinese literature
- Publisher: China Youth Publishing House (中国青年出版总社)
- Publication date: 1994
- Publication place: China
- Pages: 253 (China Youth Publishing House first edition)
- ISBN: 9787515303178

A War of One's Own or One Person's War (Simplified Chinese Characters: 一个人的战争) is a novel written in 1994 by Lin Bai (Mandarin Chinese: 林白). It explores the coming-of-age of a young woman and is retold through a series of the main character's recollections and inner thoughts which focus on her identity, sexuality, and relationships. It was originally published in avant-garde journal "The City of Flowers" (花城) and was later individually republished in July 1994. Upon its re-release, the novel sparked immediate controversy for its frank portrayal of female sexuality and homoeroticism. Some critics have deemed it "zhun huangse (quasi-pornographic) and low" literature and it has subsequently been subjugated to many rounds of censorship. Nonetheless, it is a lauded and very notable work of 1990s feminist Chinese literature and has been reprinted yearly since its initial release.

== Plot summary ==
In A War of One's Own, the reader is narrated the coming-of-age of the main character Lin Duomi. Considering the early death of her father and the busy work life of her mother, Duomi is isolated from her parents from a young age. The remarriage of her mother doesn't affect her emotionally either.

Duomi's early sexual awakening makes her realize the fascination and attraction she finds in both her own body and those of her own sex. The heavily mixed emotions she feels about her sexuality persist into adulthood.

At age nineteen, Duomi begins her career as a writer and leaves her hometown to pursue work at a film production unit. She takes a college entrance exam and succeeds in going to a prestigious university. After her studies, she eventually decides to go back to working in the film production unit.

At age twenty-four, Duomi falls in love for the first time. At thirty years old, Duomi moves to Beijing and meets her second lover, but eventually settled for a loveless marriage with an older man. In the novel's final scene, a now-grown Duomi masturbates by herself while gazing into a mirror, directly paralleling the first scene of the novel.

=== Autobiographical elements ===
A War of One's Own is heavily autobiographical and intentionally so. Not only do Lin Bai and the main character Duomi share the same family name, but Duomi, is also originally from Beiliu, Guangxi. Lin Bai's father also died at the age of three, and she also started writing and publishing her first poems at the age of nineteen.

The novel's narrator oscillates between the first person to the third person, creating a metafictional literary effect where the "I" of the narrator and novel's author, and Duomi, the main character, become interchangeable.

== Reception and cultural impact ==
A War of One's Own received overwhelmingly negative reviews in The Chinese Review (中华读书报) when it was republished in its book form. In particular, critic Ding Laixian admonished the novel for its "pornographic" and "obscene" content. The decision of the publisher to attach a picture of a nude woman as its cover solidified its notorious reputation and the book would go on to sell tens of thousands of copies.

However, other critics have since praised the novel as a great work of feminist literature for its detailed and truthful depiction of women's experiences and the ways it "implicitly critiques society’s sexual mores and conformity" by describing its main character's fear of same-sex attraction, which is the product of being socialized from a homophobic and heteronormative society. Feminist scholar Sang Tze Lan has remarked that the initial marketing of A War of One's Own, which implicitly linked it to pornography with its risqué cover, had been a deliberate choice on part of the publisher "to tame unruly female writing by confining it in a seductive but reassuring frame" and counteract the way Lin "challeng[es] the dominant fiction of female gentility with her powerful descriptions of female desire".

Lin has commented that ever since the publication of A War of One's Own "publishers have not set any conditions for me. As long as I write new work there will be some publishers willing to publish it. [...] They are willing to publish these books to create their brands."

== Bibliography ==
- Gupta, Suman (2008) Li Rui, Mo Yan, Yan Lianke and Lin Bai, Wasafiri, 23:3. DOI: 10.1080/02690050802205233, pp. 28–36.
- Tuft, Meredith Bryna. (2012).This Is Not a Woman: Literary Bodies and Private Selves in the Works of the Chinese Avant-Garde Women Writers. [Doctoral dissertation, University of Oregon]. Scholar's Bank, http://hdl.handle.net/1794/12934, pp. 122–153.
- Schaffer, Kay & Song Xianlin (2007) Unruly Spaces: Gender, Women's Writing and Indigenous Feminism in China, Journal of Gender Studies, 16:1, DOI: 10.1080/09589230601116125, pp. 26–27.
- Tze Lan Sang. 2003. "Lin Bai’s narratives of female homoerotic desire" in The Emerging Lesbian (Chicago: Chicago University Press), pp. 175–199.
- Wang, Lingzhen. 2004. Personal Matters: Women's Autobiographical Practice in Twentieth- Century China. (Stanford: Stanford University Press), pp. 176.
