= Guangdong Education Publishing House =

Chinese publishing company

Guangdong Education Publishing House (GEPH), or Guangdong Education Press (simplified Chinese: 广东教育出版社; traditional Chinese: 廣東教育出版社; pinyin: Guǎngdōng Jiàoyù Chūbǎnshè), is a professional publishing house that focuses on educational services in China. The company was founded in 1985, and is located in Guangzhou, capital city of Guangdong Province. GEPH is known for its excellent educational materials and textbooks. It has been named “National Outstanding Publishing House”, and is currently the only first-class publishing house in Guangdong Province that has been evaluated by the State Press and Publication Administration.

== History ==
Guangdong Education Publishing House was established in 1985 as a spin-off from Guangdong People's Publishing House.

In 2009, Guangdong Education Publishing House was rated as a national first-class publishing house (one of the top 100 book publishing units in the country) by the State Administration of Press, Publication, Radio, Film and Television.

In 2018, Guangdong Education Press Co., Ltd. won the "Advanced Publishing Unit Award" at the 4th China Publishing Government Award. It is the only publishing house in Guangdong Province that has won the award.

As of the end of 2020, the company's total assets were nearly 1.305 billion yuan, net profit exceeded 200 million yuan. A total of more than 500 books have won national, provincial or ministerial awards (including 40 national awards).

== Present situation ==
Guangdong Education Publishing House is now subordinated to the Southern Publishing and Media. It has a total number of nearly 500 employees. And the business mainly covers book publishing, online publishing, journal publishing, educational services, property investment, physical kindergartens, etc.

GEPH has 16 national standard textbooks (second only to People's Education Press), more than 700 local curriculum textbooks for primary and secondary schools in Guangdong Province, a variety of Hong Kong and Macao textbooks, and 42 national vocational education textbooks.

Book "New Three Character Classic" (新三字经) has sold more than 40 million copies. "Diary of the Head Nurse" won the "Five One Project" Special Award. In addition, there are books such as "Comparison of Classical and Vernacular", "History of Sino-Foreign Education Exchange", "History of Pearl River Culture", "History of Textbooks in Primary and Secondary Schools in New China", "Dictionary of Chinese Dialectology", "Collection of Studies on Socialism with Chinese Characteristics", "Hello, Zhong Nanshan", "New Coronavirus Science Picture Book for Children", and "Spring in Masks", etc.

Books published by GEPH are also available internationally.

== Honours ==
Guangdong Education Publishing House is a first-class publishing house evaluated by the National Press and Publication Administration. Other honors include National Outstanding Publishing House, National Top 100 Book Publishing Units, National Advanced Unit in the Press and Publication System, and Advanced Publishing Unit of the Fourth China Publishing Government Award, etc.

== Contact information ==
Address: 12th-15th Floor, No. 472, Huanshi East Road, Guangzhou

Tel: 020-87613639

Fax: 020-87616816

Official website: http://www.gjs.cn/
