= Innovation Cluster Ranking =

Metric tracking global innovation

Innovation Cluster Ranking is an annual ranking of the world's largest innovation clusters published as part of the Global Innovation Index (GII) by the World Intellectual Property Organization (WIPO). The ranking identifies geographically concentrated areas of innovation activity, using data on international patent filings, scientific publications and, since 2025, venture-capital deal locations. Unlike rankings based on administrative units, the cluster ranking uses a bottom-up geocoding method and may therefore define clusters that span several municipalities, subnational regions or countries.

The 2025 edition ranked Shenzhen–Hong Kong–Guangzhou first, followed by Tokyo–Yokohama, San Jose–San Francisco, Beijing and Seoul. The top 100 clusters together accounted for about 70 percent of global Patent Cooperation Treaty filings and venture-capital deal activity, and around half of all scientific publications covered by the ranking.

== History ==
The Global Innovation Index team began work on identifying science and technology clusters by means of a bottom-up approach in 2016. A first top-100 cluster ranking was published in the 2017 edition of the GII in a special section titled Identifying and Ranking the World's Largest Clusters of Inventive Activity. That early ranking focused on inventive activity and used patent data, particularly international patent applications filed under the Patent Cooperation Treaty.

The cluster ranking was later developed into a regular component of the Global Innovation Index. By the early 2020s, the methodology combined patent data with scientific publication data in order to capture both inventive and research activity. Since 2020, WIPO has also published an intensity ranking that adjusts innovation activity by estimated cluster population.

In 2025, WIPO revised the ranking by adding venture-capital deal locations as a third indicator. WIPO Director General Daren Tang stated that adding venture-capital activity helped show which clusters were translating scientific research into economic results. The revised methodology contributed to Shenzhen–Hong Kong–Guangzhou overtaking Tokyo–Yokohama as the top-ranked cluster in 2025, because the Chinese-Hong Kong cluster performed more strongly on venture-capital deal activity.

== Methodology ==
The Innovation Cluster Ranking is based on a geocoding and clustering process. In 2025, WIPO used three innovation metrics: the location of inventors listed in published patent applications, the location of authors listed in scientific articles, and the location of firms receiving venture-capital investment.

Patent data are based on published applications filed under the Patent Cooperation Treaty. WIPO uses PCT applications because the system applies common procedural rules and uniform filing standards, reducing biases that could arise from comparing national patent systems. For the 2025 ranking, the patent data covered applications published between 2020 and 2024.

Scientific publications are taken from the Science Citation Index Expanded of the Web of Science. The ranking focuses on science and technology fields and excludes publications from the social sciences and humanities, as well as non-original research items such as meeting abstracts and conference summaries. For the 2025 edition, the scientific publication data covered the years 2019 to 2023.

The venture-capital component, introduced in 2025, uses PitchBook venture-capital data. WIPO counted VC transactions by the headquarters location of the company receiving investment, while excluding pure debt deals and most accelerator-program deals. The 2025 VC data set covered 66,755 locations and 236,046 deals from 2019 to 2023.

Addresses are geocoded using ESRI's ArcGIS World Geocoder and the GeoNames gazetteer. WIPO reported that, in 2025, 98.4 percent of inventor addresses, 99.7 percent of scientific author addresses and 97.1 percent of VC deals were geocoded at city level or better. Cluster formation is based on the DBSCAN algorithm, using a radius of 15 kilometres and a density parameter of 4,500 inventor or author records. Venture-capital locations are not used to form the clusters initially; instead, they are assigned to already-defined cluster boundaries.

The resulting clusters are ranked by counting patents, scientific articles and VC deals within each cluster, calculating each cluster's global share for the three indicators and aggregating the three shares with equal weights. The 2025 procedure identified 237 clusters overall, from which the top 100 were published in the main ranking.

== Ranking ==
In the 2026 ranking, China had the largest number of top-100 clusters with 25, followed by the United States with 20 and Germany with seven. India and the United Kingdom each had four clusters in the top 100.

Top 100 innovation clusters, 2026
Rank	Cluster	Economy or economies
1	Shenzhen–Hong Kong–Guangzhou	China / Hong Kong
2	Tokyo–Yokohama	Japan
3	San Jose–San Francisco	United States
4	Beijing	China
5	Seoul	South Korea
6	Shanghai–Suzhou	China
7	New York City	United States
8	London	United Kingdom
9	Boston–Cambridge	United States
10	Osaka–Kobe–Kyoto	Japan
11	Paris	France
12	Los Angeles	United States
13	Hangzhou	China
14	San Diego	United States
15	Nanjing	China
16	Singapore–Johor Bahru	Singapore / Malaysia
17	Wuhan	China
18	Washington–Baltimore	United States
19	Tel Aviv–Jerusalem	Israel
20	Chengdu	China
21	Philadelphia	United States
22	Daejeon	South Korea
23	Xi'an	China
24	Seattle	United States
25	Bengaluru	India
26	Amsterdam–Rotterdam	Netherlands
27	Delhi	India
28	Munich	Germany
29	Nagoya	Japan
30	Stockholm	Sweden
31	Berlin	Germany
32	Hefei	China
33	Qingdao	China
34	Chicago	United States
35	Denver	United States
36	Toronto	Canada
37	Austin	United States
38	Sydney	Australia
39	Houston	United States
40	Zürich	Switzerland
41	Changsha	China
42	Taipei–Hsinchu	Taiwan
43	Mumbai	India
44	Tianjin	China
45	Barcelona	Spain
46	Cologne	Germany
47	Copenhagen	Denmark
48	Madrid	Spain
49	São Paulo	Brazil
50	Moscow	Russia
51	Minneapolis	United States
52	Chongqing	China
53	Melbourne	Australia
54	Stuttgart	Germany
55	Raleigh	United States
56	Istanbul	Turkey
57	Milan	Italy
58	Brussels–Antwerp	Belgium
59	Helsinki	Finland
60	Atlanta	United States
61	Miami	United States
62	Montréal	Canada
63	Dallas	United States
64	Jinan	China
65	Tehran	Iran
66	Eindhoven	Netherlands
67	Frankfurt am Main	Germany
68	Vancouver	Canada
69	Changchun	China
70	Harbin	China
71	Cambridge	United Kingdom
72	Dublin	Ireland
73	Zhengzhou	China
74	Shenyang	China
75	Ningde	China
76	Vienna	Austria
77	Portland	United States
78	Xiamen	China
79	Chennai	India
80	Phoenix	United States
81	Rome	Italy
82	Mexico City	Mexico
83	Dalian	China
84	Pittsburgh	United States
85	Oxford	United Kingdom
86	Cairo	Egypt
87	Ningbo	China
88	Heidelberg–Mannheim	Germany
89	Oslo	Norway
90	Kuala Lumpur	Malaysia
91	Warsaw	Poland
92	Riyadh	Saudi Arabia
93	Hamburg	Germany
94	Zhenjiang	China
95	Lyon	France
96	Fuzhou	China
97	Manchester	United Kingdom
98	Busan	South Korea
99	Macau–Zhuhai	China
100	Göteborg	Sweden

== Reception ==
The ranking has been cited in international and regional media coverage of technology policy, national competitiveness and innovation geography.

The rise of Shenzhen–Hong Kong–Guangzhou to first place received particular attention in Chinese and Hong Kong media. Xinhua, in a report republished by the English-language website of the State Council of China, described the result as the first time the cluster had overtaken Tokyo–Yokohama and linked the ranking to the development of the Guangdong–Hong Kong–Macao Greater Bay Area. Time Out Hong Kong similarly reported that the 2025 ranking had recognized Shenzhen–Hong Kong–Guangzhou as the world's leading innovation hub after WIPO added venture-capital activity to the methodology.

== See also ==
- Global Innovation Index
- Nature Index
- Innovation system
- Research and development
- Science park
- Technology cluster
