= Lin Bai =

Chinese writer

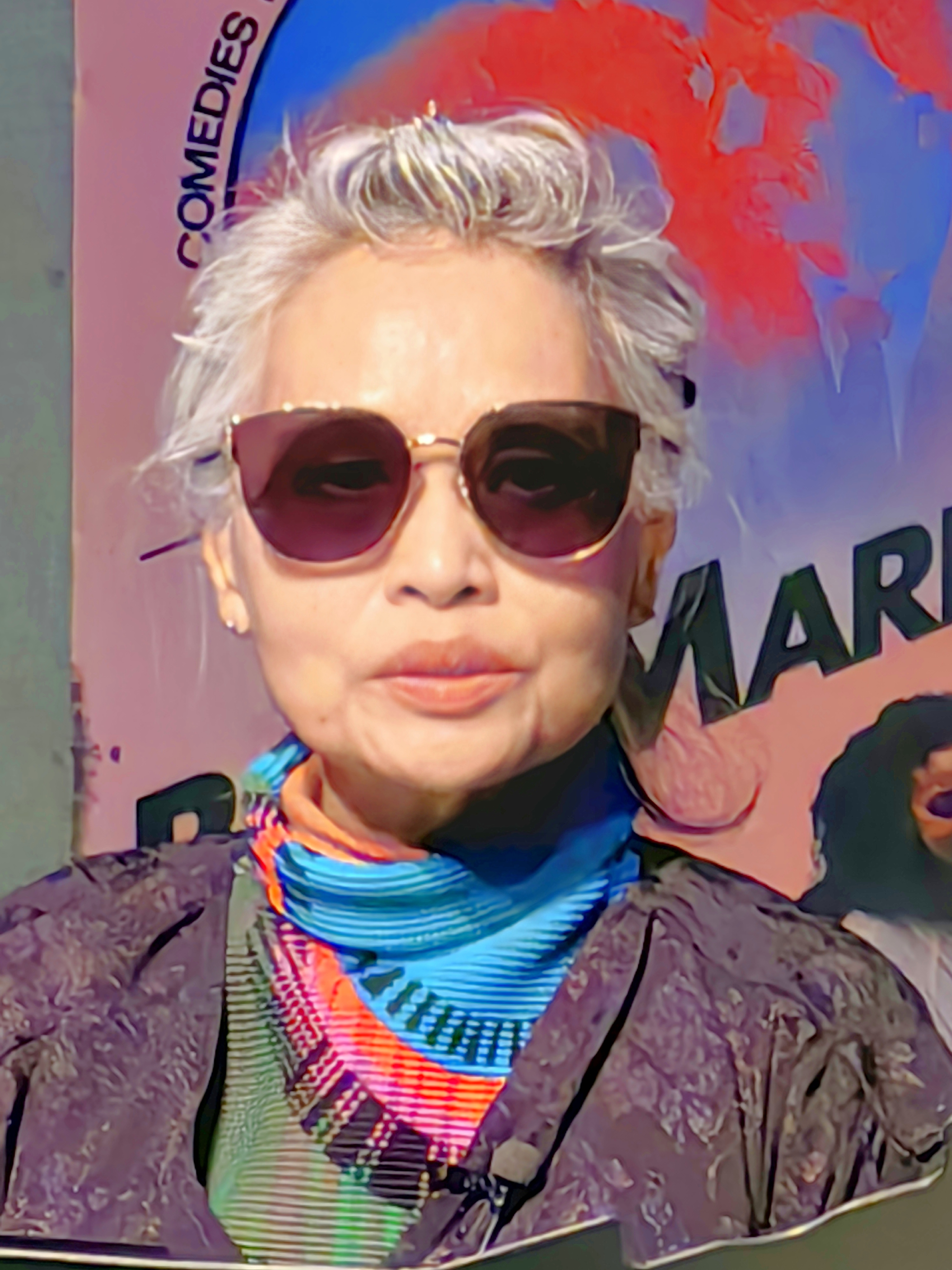
- Born: 1958 (age 67–68); Beiliu, China
- Occupation: Writer
- Writing career
- Period: 1990s-present
- Genres: Fiction, Autobiography, Poetry

Lin Bai, born Lin Baiwei (Chinese: 林白; born in 1958), is a Chinese avant-garde writer and poet. Her best known works deal with female homoeroticism in post-Mao China and are also known for being very personal and autobiographical. Lin Bai is famously known for A War of One's Own and The Seat on the Veranda. The author won the Chinese Literature Media Award for her novel Records of Women Gossiping.

== Biography ==
Lin Bai was born in Beiliu County, Guangxi Province in 1958. She spent her childhood in a small town in Beiliu. Her father died when she was three. At the age of 17, she started doing poetry after being sent to the countryside as an educated youth. After passing the college entrance examination in 1977, Lin Bai studied library science at Wuhan University from 1978 to 1982. She worked as a librarian at the Guangxi Provincial Library after graduating. From 1985 to 1990, she worked as an editor and screenwriter at the Guangxi Film Studio. Her time in film production influenced her fiction writing.

Lin Bai moved to Beijing in the early 1990s to work for the newspaper Chinese Cultural Forum (Zhongguo wenhua bao). During this time she married a senior cultural official and they had a daughter in 1991. They have since separated. Lin Bai is still an active writer to this day.

== A War of One's Own ==
A War of One's Own (also known as A Self at War or A One-Person War) is an autobiographical novel published in 1994. It is her most famous work and gained popularity in the 1990s. Even though it was ready for publication in 1993, Lin Bai's writings were rejected by many literary magazines.The novel was accepted for publishing by Flower City (Huacheng), a Guanzhou-based avant-garde journal. It was only in July 1994 that her novel took interest in the general public, when the front cover to publicize it was a picture of a nude women. In 1995-1996, Lin Bai encountered several censorship issues due to the description of "autoerotic activity and homoerotic relationships" in her book.

A War of One's Own follows the story of Lin Duomi from the age of five years old to her adulthood. The story explores female sexuality and experiences. It is narrated in the first person. Many similarities can be found between the main events of A War of One's Own and Lin Bai's life experiences. The story is said to be inspired from the author's shift from living in the small town of Beiliu to moving to Beijing. The book explores the notion of rejection through the character of Lin Duomi.

The book is often compared with Chen Ran's A Private Life for their similar themes. The common themes shared by both novels are loneliness, sexuality, narcissism, the mix of autobiography and fiction, escape, taboos and privacy. The literary trend called "Individualized Writing" is represented by both authors. According to some, both pieces address the notions of shame and insecurity all while having "daydreaming features and [a] consumerist structure".

A War of One's Own is considered a controversial novel. The Chinese Book Review (Zhonghua dushubao) depicted the novel as "pornography" (chungong) or "obscenity" (huangse) when it was first published. It is also considered a feminist work by some for its detailed account of female personal experiences. The marketing of this novel is considered by some to have "repackaged" the female narrative and experience to interest the male counterparts through voyeurism. Moreover, even though it was not Lin Bai's main goal through her narration, the novel has been perceived as a "complex view of homophobia as a form of internalized social discrimination".

== Writing career and reception ==
Lin Bai began writing poems in 1975. Her poetry dating from the 1980s can be depicted as descriptive while her poems starting from the 1990s are seen as more introspective. She started her writing career with a plagiarism issue. During her first publication, one of the four poems published in Guangxi Literature and Art (Guangxi wenyi) was found to be written by another person. This incident did not stop Lin Bai from writing her own poetry and fiction work later on. The year of 1987 marked one of the first recognition of her works through the publication of short stories in the well established journals People's Literature (Renmin wenxue) and Shanghai Literature (Shanghai wenxue). In 1993, she wrote the short stories Water in a Bottle (Pingzhong zhi shui) and A Chair in the Encircling Corridor (Huilang zhi yi) and the novel A War of One's Own. These three publications marked Lin Bai's entrance as a major contemporary female writer in China.

Lin's novel Women's Idle talk portrays the ramblings of an old rural woman who works in the narrator's home (Lin is the narrator); through these non-linear fragments, Lin learns about the economic and moral crises in rural China.

Lin Bai's writing style is distinctive by her focus on specific issues women may face during their adulthood in the 1990s Chinese society . The author is known to draw her stories from personal experiences, combining them with fiction. The personal aspect of writing is important for the author, as it can be seen in her novel A War of One's Own. Her publications are often centered around women's relationships and personal experiences. Some of the themes explored in her writings are sexuality, sexual orientation, female friendships, women's psychology, the search for freedom, masturbation, women's conditions in the workplace and at home, regionalism and bodily experiences.

Lin Bai has received some criticism for the themes addressed in her publications. The author is known to have a direct approach to such subjects, which was unique and uncommon during the post-Mao cultural era. Lin Bai is also critiqued for her publications serving as means for "voyeurism and confirming traditional ideas about gender difference". On the other hand, her writings are also considered feminist by some for depicting women's realities and experiences all while denunciating taboos.

== Publications ==
- From the River to the Bank (Cong he bian dao an shang) (1986)
- Entering the River (Liuru na he) (1987)
- The Roses' Passageway (1993)
- Water in a Bottle (Pingzhong zhi shui) (1993)
- A War of One's Own/ A One-Person War (Yigeren de zhanzheng) (1994)
- Watching the Empty Years Pass By (Shouwang kongxin suiyue) (1995)
- Fatal Flight (Zhiming de feixiang) (1995)
- The Seat on The Verandah (1995)
- Musk (Qingtai) (1995)
- The Bullet across the Apple (Zidan chuanguo pingguo) (1995)
- A Known Love (Siceng xiangshi de aiqing) (1995)
- Zero Degrees' Freedom (Ling du ziyou) (1996)
- Silk and Years (Sichou yu suiyue) (1996)
- Memory and Individualized Writing (Jiyi yu gerenhua xiezuo)(1996)
- The Gallery Seat/ A Chair in the Encircling Corridor (Huilang zhi yi) (1996)
- Speaking, My Room (Shuoba, fangjian) (1997)
- Enchanting like a Ghost (Xiang gui yiyang miren) (1998)
- The Rice Jar (Mi gang) (1999)
- The Records of Women's Gossip (2006)
- The Chronicle of My Life in the North (2013)
- The Lockdown Poems: The Road to the Crematorium (2020)
