= Guangdong–Hong Kong–Macao Greater Bay Area =

Pearl River Delta metropolitan region in China

- Region
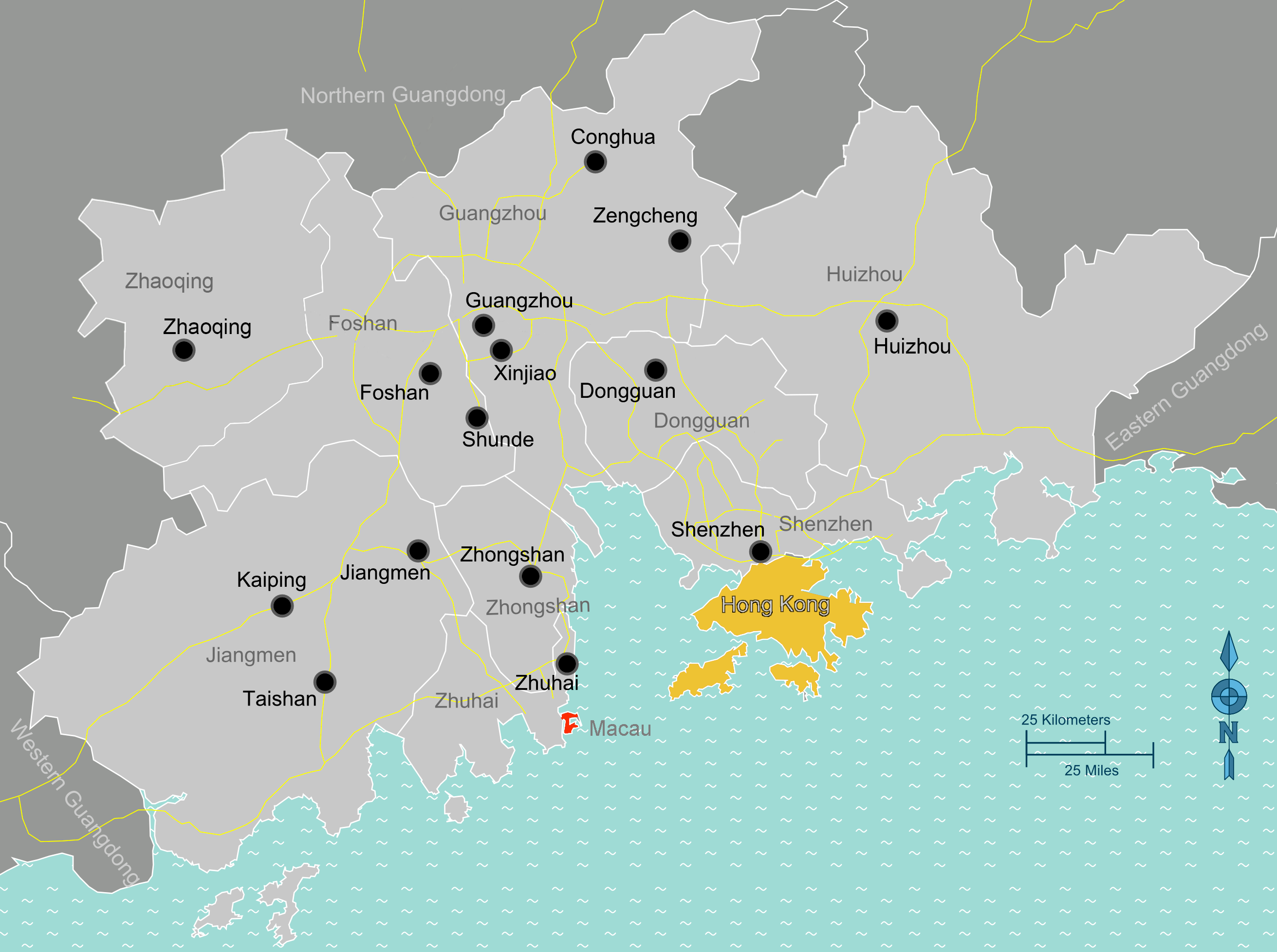
- Detailed map of the Guangdong-Hong Kong-Macau Greater Bay Area
- Country: China
- Cities: Guangzhou; Shenzhen; Zhuhai; Foshan; Dongguan; Zhongshan; Jiangmen; Huizhou; Zhaoqing
- SAR: Hong Kong; Macau

Area
  - Total: 55,800 km^{2} (21,500 sq mi)

Population
  - Total: 86,100,000
  - Rank: 2nd

Demographics
  - Languages: Chinese (Cantonese, Mandarin, Hakka), English; Portuguese

GDP (nominal, 2024)
  - Total: CN¥14.8 trillion (US$2.1 trillion)
  - Per capita: CN¥170,900 (US$23,800)
- Time zone: UTC+08:00 (CST, HKT, MST)
- Website: cnbayarea.org.cn bayarea.gov.hk dsec.gov.mo

The Guangdong–Hong Kong–Macao Greater Bay Area, (Note: simplified Chinese: 粤港澳大湾区; traditional Chinese: 粵港澳大灣區; pinyin: Yuègǎngào dàwānqū; Jyutping: jyut6 gong2 ou3 daai6 waan1 keoi1, English: Guangdong–Hong Kong–Macao Greater Bay Area, Portuguese: Grande Área da Baía Guangdong–Hong Kong–Macau) commonly referred to as the Greater Bay Area (GBA) or Pearl River megalopolis, is a megalopolis, consisting of nine cities and two special administrative regions in South China.

It is the largest and most populated urban area in the world. The GBA—with a total population of approximately 86 million people—includes nine mega cities of Guangdong province: Guangzhou, Shenzhen, Zhuhai, Foshan, Dongguan, Zhongshan, Jiangmen, Huizhou, and Zhaoqing as well as two special administrative regions, Hong Kong, and Macao (Macau). Hong Kong, Guangzhou, and Shenzhen have been described among the world's 50 "superstar cities". Surrounding the Pearl River Delta with a total area of 56,000 km^{2} (comparable in size to Croatia), it is the largest and the richest economic region in South China.

The GBA's combined regional GDP was RMB¥15 trillion (US$2.1 trillion) in 2024, which was equivalent to Spain. In 2024, the GDP of the Guangdong–Hong Kong–Macao Greater Bay Area surpassed RMB 14.5 trillion. As one of China's most vibrant and important regions, the GBA has the highest concentration of Fortune 500 companies in the country and houses a majority of China's most innovative technology companies, such as Huawei, ZTE, DJI, BYD, GAC Group, and Tencent (parent company of WeChat). GBA has a rich ecosystem of startups, incubators, and accelerators in the fields of agile tech, biotech, medical tech, and innovation. For these reasons, many experts consider the region an emerging Silicon Valley of Asia. According to the WIPO Innovation Cluster Rating 2025, the region is the leading science and technology cluster in the world.

== Definition ==
The "Guangdong–Hong Kong–Macao Greater Bay Area" is sometimes confused with the area of the Pearl River Delta, which is a term coined in 1947 referring to a smaller area. In the early 2000s, Chinese scholars began using the term "Greater Pearl River Delta" (GPRD) which described the 9 + 2 city agglomeration that encompassed post-handover Hong Kong and Macao, conceptualized as a series of lesser cities as industrial nodes with specialist functions clustering around two prominent cores – Guangzhou and Shenzhen. In 2003, the province advocated the idea of "Pan-PRD" as an even more extensive regional construct that comprised nine neighboring provinces to promote economic cooperation. A somewhat similar idea is later mentioned in the English version of China's 13th Five-Year Plan, taking the Pearl River Delta and including the larger province of Guangdong. On 1 July 2017, the "Framework Agreement on Deepening Guangdong–Hong Kong–Macao Cooperation in the Development of the Bay Area" (深化粵港澳合作 推進大灣區建設框架協議) was signed in Hong Kong.

== History ==
The Greater Bay Area has been influenced by its coastal location for centuries. The first known ships from the area are believed to have been constructed by the people of the Nanyue Kingdom (204–112 BCE), who employed them for cultural and economic exchanges with countries as far as present-day Vietnam. After the takeover of the Han Dynasty, trading relations expanded beyond to reach Sri Lanka. During the subsequent period of the Three Kingdoms, these trade routes were consolidated. Trade and cultural exchanges grew. Among this, the port of Guangzhou played a major role for the region's trade and cultural exchanges for over two thousand years. Established under the Kingdom of Wu during the period of the Three Kingdoms (222–280 CE), it eventually grew to become the starting point of the ancient maritime silk road during the Eastern Jin Dynasty (317–420 CE). By the fourth century CE, communities of foreign merchants began establishing themselves in the city.

Since the first foreign merchants have established themselves in Guangdong, the whole GBA region's importance for global trade has only increased. When Macao became a Portuguese colony in the mid-1550s, it represented one of the first trading ports in the Far East. It was later joined by Guangzhou, whose port was the only one remaining open for foreign trade during the closure of the country under the Qing. The Opium Wars brought Hong Kong under British control and forced the opening of other ports in the region. While their respective economic importance was subject to fluctuations later on, the establishment of special economic zones should begin to drive their economic importance anew.

Guangzhou, the provincial capital of Guangdong province, attracted the first U.S. investments such as Coca-Cola, Procter & Gamble, Pepsi in 1990s and to date is the most concentrated area of U.S.-financed enterprises which have invested in southern China.

On 18 February 2019, the Outline Development Plan for the Guangdong–Hong Kong–Macao Greater Bay Area was adopted. The ambitious goal foresees a linkage of the nine cities in Guangdong province's Pearl River Delta, Hong Kong and Macau into an integrated economy and world-class business hub. In addition, it is expected to play a key role in Belt and Road Initiative by connecting southern China with the countries along the 21st Century Maritime Silk Road.

== Geography ==
The GBA is located in the southern coastal area of China, consisting of nine cities, or around 30% of the land mass, of the province of Guangdong, plus the Special Administrative Regions of Hong Kong and Macao. Its climate ranges from humid subtropical to tropical climate in the far south. There are a few mountain ranges collectively called the Nanling as well as a few inactive volcanoes on Leizhou Peninsula.

Mountain ranges and peninsulas shape the GBA. The province of Guangdong, for instance, possesses a coastline of 4,114 km (2,556 mi) due to the multiplicity of islands, bays and peninsulas. This multiplicity of small islands results from the Pearl River Delta, which is the convergent point of the East, North and West Rivers. The network of bays and rivers has contributed to the archipelagic nature of many cities within the GBA. The cities of Guangzhou, Zhuhai, Hong Kong, and Macao for instance "each possess constituent and distinctly islanded territorial niches that are focused on particular industrial areas."

The entire area has temperate springs (March to May), hot and wet summers (June to August), clear and cool autumns (September to November), and mild, rainy winters (December to February). The annual average temperature of Guangdong Province is around 22.3 °C (72.1 °F), with the average temperature of 16–19 °C (61–66 °F) in January and 28–29 °C (82–84 °F) in July. However, the highest temperature in summer goes more than 35 °C (95 °F) and the lowest can be lower than 10 °C (50 °F). Temperatures in Hong Kong and Macao are nearly the same, with the annual average temperature around 23 °C (73 °F), a little higher due to their location more to the south and closer to the equator. GBA receives abundant amount of precipitation throughout the year.

In 2019, GBA has a total population of approximately 86.17 million people (5% of China's total population). The population is expected to reach 100 million people by 2030.

Cities	Urban area pop.	District area pop.	Administrative area pop.	Census date
Guangzhou	10,641,408	14,904,400	14,904,400	2020-11-01
Shenzhen	12,356,820	12,356,820	12,356,820	2020-11-01
Dongguan	8,396,820	8,396,820	8,396,820	2019-11-01
Hong Kong	7,515,489	7,515,489	7,515,489	2020-06-30
Foshan	7,348,581	7,348,581	9,498,863	2020-11-01
Zhongshan	2,913,974	3,121,275	3,121,275	2020-11-01
Huizhou	1,807,858	2,344,634	4,598,402	2010-11-01
Jiangmen	1,480,023	1,822,614	4,450,703	2010-11-01
Zhuhai	1,369,538	1,759,000	1,759,000	2020-11-01
Zhaoqing	784,642	1,397,152	3,916,467	2010-11-01
Macau	652,032	652,032	652,032	2020-08-12
Total	50,850,140	56,350,214	65,901,668	

== Demographics ==
=== Languages ===
The Ministry of Education (MOE) held a press conference on June 2, 2021, to disclose the "Report on the Language Life Situation in Guangdong, Hong Kong and Macao Greater Bay Area (2021)". The report, which was compiled by the National Language Service and Guangdong–Hong Kong–Macao Greater Bay Area Language Research Center under the auspices of the State Language Commission, together with a team from Guangzhou University, summarizes the state of language life in the region, and proposes recommendations for the construction of the language and writing environment and language services on the basis of the report.

== Economy ==
City	Area km^{2}	Population (2020)	GDP (LCU)	GDP (US$)
Shenzhen	1,986	17,560,000	CN¥ 3,680 billion	US$ 512.6 billion
Guangzhou	7,434	18,676,605	CN¥ 3,103 billion	US$ 432.2 billion
Hong Kong	1,114	7,413,070	HK$ 3,138 billion	US$ 401.8 billion
Foshan	3,848	9,498,863	CN¥ 1,336 billion	US$ 186.1 billion
Dongguan	2,465	10,466,625	CN¥ 1,228 billion	US$ 171.1 billion
Huizhou	10,922	6,042,852	CN¥ 614 billion	US$ 85.5 billion
Zhuhai	1,724	2,439,585	CN¥ 448 billion	US$ 62.4 billion
Zhongshan	1,784	4,418,060	CN¥ 414 billion	US$ 57.7 billion
Macau	115	672,800	MOP$ 430 billion	US$ 53.4 billion
Jiangmen	9,535	4,798,090	CN¥ 421 billion	US$ 58.2 billion
Zhaoqing	14,891	4,113,594	CN¥ 292 billion	US$ 40.7 billion
Guangdong–Hong Kong–Macau; Greater Bay Area	55,818	86,100,000	CN¥ 14.816 trillion	US$ 2.062 trillion

The Greater Bay Area is a critical export hub, accounting for 37% of China's exports, driven by the large airports and railway stations of a well-connected transportation system. GBA hosts three of the world's top ten container ports and five international airports in Hong Kong, Guangzhou, Shenzhen, Macau and Zhuhai. These airports account for an air freight traffic bigger than San Francisco, New York, and Tokyo combined.

The GBA is an economic powerhouse. Its combined regional GDP was RMB¥13 trillion (US$1.8 trillion) in 2022, which is equivalent to over 10 percent of GDP for all of China. If the GBA were its own country, it would rank as the 12th biggest economy globally (almost equal to South Korea's and bigger than Australia's economy). GDP growth of GBA was 4.4 per cent in 2019, and GDP is expected to reach US$4 trillion by 2030, which would lead the GBA's GDP to overtake that of Germany in 2019.

According to the latest statistics released by the Macao Statistics and Census Service and the governments of Guangdong, Hong Kong and Macao, the Guangdong–Hong Kong–Macao Greater Bay Area recorded a regional GDP of around RMB 14.0 trillion in 2023, which further exceeded RMB 14.5 trillion in 2024, with a total population of over 87 million. In 2024, the nine mainland cities of the GBA generated 8.6% of China's national GDP with only 0.58% of its land area and 5.6% of its population.

The GBA maintains a strong industrial base that underpins its economic development. Its economy is driven by a range of traditional and advanced manufacturing sectors, including wood and plastics processing, textiles, electronics, food production, construction, automotive and aerospace industries, medical technology, and information technology, including software and hardware development. The Outline Development Plan aims to establish industrial clusters focused on advanced equipment manufacturing in Zhuhai and Foshan, and high-end manufacturing in Shenzhen and Dongguan, building on the region's existing manufacturing base.

The region has a diverse economic outlook with industrial development zones in all eleven cities, covering emerging industries, R&D and high-end sectors, notably the Internet of Things (IoT), artificial intelligence, hydrogen technologies, new mobility, and cleantech. Healthcare is another rapidly growing sector in the Greater Bay Area. The Guangzhou International Bio-Technology Island (formerly known as Dove Island) located in Huangpu district, Guangzhou is a biotech industrial zone in the region.

Seeking to attract foreign investors, the government published Opinions Concerning Financial Support for the Establishment of the Guangdong-Hong Kong-Macao Greater Bay Area in 2020, which envisaged gradual financial liberalization. The People's Bank of China has introduced new measures aimed at liberalizing China's controls on foreign exchange and foreign currency remittance.

22 companies from the Guangdong-Hong Kong-Macao Greater Bay Area (GBA) make their mark on the 2024 Fortune Global 500 list, including 17 from Guangdong and 5 from Hong Kong.

In the first half of 2025, the Greater Bay Area (GBA) continued to advance high-quality development, with technological innovation and regional integration serving as key drivers. In the digital economy and tech sector, Shenzhen accelerated growth in strategic emerging industries such as AI, biomedicine, and semiconductors. Guangzhou's Nansha FTZ launched pilot projects for cross-border data flow, while Hong Kong advanced cross-regional R&D cooperation through its "Blueprint for Innovation and Technology" and the InnoHK initiative.

There are at least 31 joint laboratories established across Guangdong, Hong Kong and Macao.

According to official statistics released by Guangdong Province, research and development (R&D) expenditure intensity—defined as R&D expenditure as a percentage of GDP—in the Guangdong–Hong Kong–Macao Greater Bay Area has exceeded 3 percent.

=== Outline Development Plan ===
The Outline Development Plan for the Guangdong-Hong Kong-Macao Greater Bay Area, released by the Chinese central government in February 2019, outlines the integration of nine cities in Guangdong's Pearl River Delta with Hong Kong and Macau into a unified economic region. The plan sets milestones aimed at establishing the Greater Bay Area as a globally competitive business hub by 2022, with further development into an international first-class bay area by 2035, emphasizing reform, innovation, connectivity, and environmental sustainability.

The plan includes major infrastructure initiatives such as the development of an international airport cluster, inter-city high-speed rail, and expressways, including the construction of two new bridges across the Pearl River Delta. In response to environmental concerns, the plan also emphasizes ecological conservation and the promotion of green and low-carbon development models. The overarching goal is to transform the GBA into a service-oriented economy.

The GBA development strategy assigns specific roles to its four core cities based on their comparative advantages: Hong Kong will focus on enhancing its status as an international financial and logistics hub; Macau will develop as a center for tourism, leisure, cultural exchange, and trade with Portuguese-speaking countries; Guangzhou will serve as a commercial, transportation, and educational center; and Shenzhen will prioritize innovation. Collectively, these specializations aim to transform the GBA into a globally competitive city cluster. The plan also supports the Hong Kong's development as a global offshore renminbi center, an international asset and risk management hub, and a regional center for legal and dispute resolution services.

=== Urbanization ===
With the rising economic importance, the GBA also underwent unprecedented urban growth over the past three decades. The total urban areas have expanded from 652.74 km^{2} (252.02 sq mi) in 1986 to 8,137.09 km^{2} (3,141.75 sq mi) in 2017 (approximately 13 times), at an 8.28% average annual growth rate.

The area faces several challenges in implementing urban development solutions, including worsening air pollution, limited cross-border mobility, and constraints on the capital flow, information, and data. A study by Wang et al. projected that urbanization and climate change will lead to an 8.87% increase in the exposure duration of dangerous discomfort (Humidex equal to/above 45) for GBA residents by 2030.

=== Healthcare industry ===
The Greater Bay Area is a leading hub for medical device production and innovation in China. In 2019, the region's medical device industry generated an output value of US$18.51 billion, representing 16.67% of the national total—the highest among all regions. It hosts several innovation platforms, including high-performance medical device centers, which support industrial development. Under the National Medical Products Administration's "Special Approval Procedure for Innovative Medical Devices", launched in 2014, 44 out of 265 approved innovative medical devices as of June 2020 originated from companies in the Greater Bay Area, accounting for 19% of selected domestic products.

=== Green Economy ===
In green development, the GBA actively fostered industrial chains in photovoltaics, hydrogen energy, and energy storage. It also enhanced standards in green buildings and eco-transport. Hong Kong solidified its status as Asia's green finance hub, while cities like Guangzhou and Shenzhen introduced green zone evaluations and pilot mechanisms. Hydrogen-powered buses and smart EVs have been deployed across multiple GBA cities.

=== GBA Development of the International Center for Innovation and Technology ("I&T") ===
The Government is stepping up its efforts to develop innovation and technology in eight major areas, including: increasing resources for research and development (R&D); pooling scientific and technological talents; providing investment funds; providing scientific research infrastructure; reviewing existing laws and regulations; opening up government data; strengthening procurement arrangements; and enhancing science education. To date, the Government has invested over $100 billion.

The Greater Bay Area (GBA) continues to evolve rapidly, and 2024 brings new developments and strategies that further strengthen its role as a global economic powerhouse. Here are some key updates for 2024:

==== Technological Innovation and High-Tech Industry ====
Shenzhen continues to lead in technological innovation, positioning itself as a global hub for artificial intelligence (AI), biotechnology, big data, and 5G technologies. The city has increased investment in R&D, with a special focus on semiconductor production, aiming to reduce China's reliance on imported chips.

== Education ==
GBA is home to numerous universities with hospitals and academic centres. The university town located on the Xiaoguwei Island in Guangzhou is considered as one of the "ten cores" of the "Science and Technology Innovation Corridor (STIC)"-blueprint for "China's Silicon Valley".

Numerous highly rated medical schools operate in the region, including the First Affiliated Hospital of Sun Yat-sen University, a leading hospital with over 3,000 beds. Several world leaders in translational medicine are based in GBA, such as the lung cancer authority Professor Yi-Long Wu (vice-president of the Guangdong General Hospital and Guangdong Academy of Medical Sciences, and a director of Guangdong Lung Cancer Institute).

Overall, GBA has over 200 universities, producing many college and advanced degrees graduates — over 570,000 college students a year graduates alone in Guangzhou. Within the GBA, Hong Kong hosts the highest density of top universities globally. Times Higher Education lists as the Top 5 of them the University of Hong Kong (ranked place 39 worldwide in 2021), the Chinese University of Hong Kong (ranked 56 worldwide in 2021), the Hong Kong University of Science and Technology (ranked 56 worldwide in 2021), the City University of Hong Kong (ranked 126 worldwide in 2021) and the Hong Kong Polytechnic University (ranked 129 worldwide in 2021).

The government seeks to enhance innovation and technology collaboration. Efforts include opening Guangdong's R&D facilities to Hong Kong institutions, supporting participation in national technology programs, and promoting cross-border R&D initiatives. Key infrastructure such as the Hong Kong-Shenzhen Innovation and Technology Park, five Hong Kong R&D centres, the Hong Kong Science Park, Cyberport, and State Key Laboratories are involved. The policy also facilitates the exchange of talent, access to funding, and data sharing across regions, while offering immigration and administrative support to promote cross-boundary cooperation in science and technology.

== Transportation ==
GBA is connected by a transportation network featuring Huangpu Bridge, Guangzhou-Shenzhen-Hong Kong High-speed Railway, Hong Kong-Zhuhai-Macao Bridge (HZM Bridge), Nansha Bridge and Guangzhou-Shenzhen Intercity Railway.

There are also massive ongoing infrastructure projects underway. Among them – construction of Guangzhou-Zhanjiang High-speed Railway, Gangzhou-Shenzhen Highspeed Railway and Guangzhou-Shanwei-Shantou High-speed Railway.

In 2024, the completion of several infrastructure projects in the GBA region is set to improve connectivity further. The Shenzhen-Zhongshan Bridge, a key transportation link, is expected to open, dramatically cutting travel time across the Pearl River Delta.

Further step in GBA's infrastructure development is establishment of airport clusters. Five main airports – Hong Kong International Airport, Guangzhou Baiyun International Airport, Shenzhen Bao'an International Airport, Macau International Airport and Zhuhai Jinwan Airport—as well as a group of feeder airports, will constitute a cluster that will be developed in two phases.

Phase one, due for completion in 2025, will establish a Greater Bay Area airport conglomerate, with greater interaction between the facilities. Phase 2 aims to lift all the airports to a world-class level by 2035 with "safe, green, smart, human and synergetic qualities".

The Hong Kong section of the Guangzhou-Shenzhen-Hong Kong Express Rail Link (XRL) connects to the national high-speed rail network, significantly shortening the travelling time between Hong Kong and Shenzhen, Guangzhou and other cities in the Pearl River Delta (PRD) region, and reinforcing Hong Kong's position as a regional transportation hub. in the first six months of 2023, the Hong Kong section of the XRL recorded an average daily patronage of more than 40,000 passenger trips, with the highest number of passenger trips in a single day exceeding 90,000 passenger trips.

Regarding infrastructure and connectivity, major rail and road projects—such as the Guangzhou-Shenzhen intercity railway, the Guangfo South Ring, and the Shenzhen-Zhongshan Corridor—are reshaping regional mobility, gradually forming a "1-hour living circle" that boosts efficiency in transport and logistics. Additionally, collaboration in communication, energy, and data centers is enhancing the overall operational synergy of the region.

By 2025, intercity railways in the Greater Bay Area had expanded into a network exceeding 4,000 km, while cross-border integration measures included 198 shared public services, 267 regional standards, and 308 certifications.

=== Bridges ===
- Huangpu Bridge
- Nansha Bridge
- Humen Pearl River Bridge
- Shenzhen-Zhongshan Bridge
- Hong Kong-Zhuhai-Macau Bridge
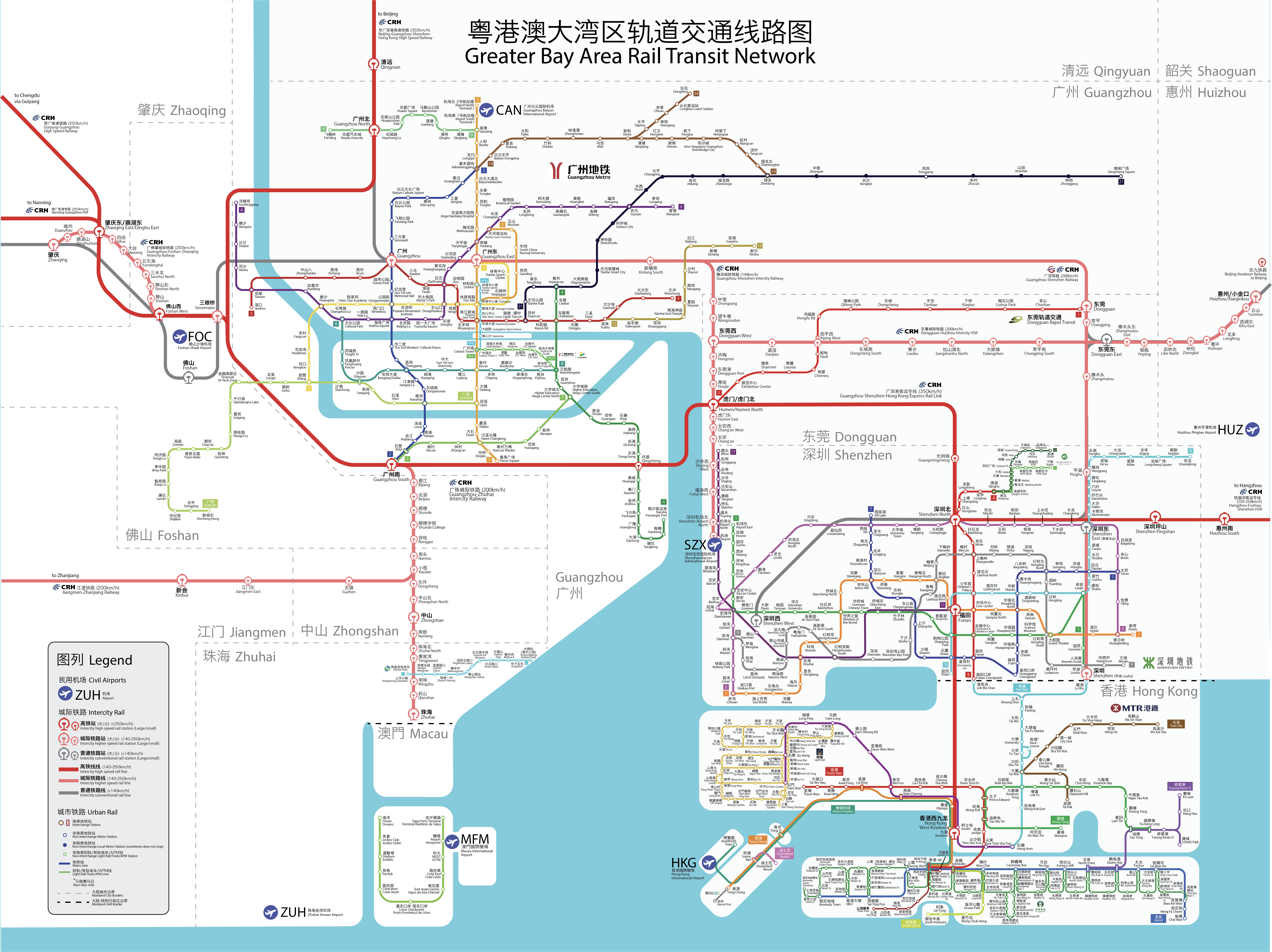
Guangdong-Hong Kong-Macau Bay Area Rail Transit Network in 2020

Guangdong-Hong Kong-Macau Bay Area Rail Transit Network in 2035+

=== Rail ===
Urban rail transit (including metros, commuter and regional railways) is expanding very fast. Hong Kong MTR was the first, and its model has subsequently been applied to other networks in the region. The total length of all cities' metro lines is now 924.8 km (574.6 mi).

==== Metro ====
- Dongguan Rail Transit
- Foshan Metro
- Guangzhou Metro
- Hong Kong Mass Transit Railway
- Macau Light Rapid Transit
- Shenzhen Metro

==== Regional and commuter railway ====
- CR C-train (several sections)

==== Light rail and tram ====
- Guangzhou Trams
- Hong Kong Light Rail
- Hong Kong Tramways
- Hong Kong Peak Tram
- Shenzhen Tram
- Zhuhai Tram

==== Intercity railway ====
- Guangzhou–Kowloon through train
- Guangzhou–Shenzhen–Hong Kong Express Rail Link Hong Kong section
- Guangzhou–Foshan–Zhaoqing intercity railway
- Guangzhou–Shenzhen railway
- Dongguan–Huizhou intercity railway
- Guangzhou-Zhuhai-Jiangmen intercity railway

=== Air ===
- Hong Kong International Airport
- Macau International Airport
- Shenzhen Bao'an International Airport
- Guangzhou Baiyun International Airport
- Zhuhai Jinwan Airport
- Foshan Shadi Airport
- Huizhou Pingtan Airport

== Government and politics ==
=== Public administration ===
Starting from May 30, 2019, Hong Kong and Macao residents can use the local self-service terminal system to handle the relevant government services in Nanhai District of Foshan City. Guangdong Province has also formally proposed to introduce a credit scoring system to cover Hong Kong and Macao in the next three years, with a view to sharing credit information in the Greater Bay Area and providing credit incentives and sanctions for enterprises in the region. There are also plans to promote information sharing between the Mainland, Hong Kong and Macao, and to strengthen police cooperation and exchanges to deal with security threats.

== Culture ==
Being part of the Silk Road as well as Chinese international marine gates and trade hotspot for the last two thousand years, GBA is rich in cultural and folk traditions, languages, and food.

However, not all parts of the GBA are predominantly Cantonese. In particular, Huizhou is culturally distinct as it is historically a stronghold of the Hakka, rather than Cantonese speakers. As a result, Huizhou’s local language, traditions, and cuisine align more closely with Hakka culture, which differs from mainstream Cantonese culture in dialect, architecture (such as walled villages), and food (for example, preserved and salt-baked dishes).

There are many notable foods in Hong Kong, the most famous of which are pineapple buns, cart noodles, egg waffles and Hong Kong-style milk tea. A local's day usually starts with a bowl of fish ball noodles or wonton noodles and a cup of soy milk. Notable foods in Macao are egg tarts, Chicken cakes and pork jerky.

Hong Kong and Macau also has its distinct local culture, largely based on Cantonese culture, but also heavily influenced by British and Portuguese colonisation over the past two centuries.

The distinct feature of Cantonese culture is the Cantonese language and Cantonese cuisine. Cantonese language is the official spoken language in Hong Kong and Macau. In Guangdong and Guangxi, Mandarin Chinese is the official language taught in schools, but Cantonese is most frequently used in everyday life.

== See also ==
- Pearl River Delta
- Pearl River Delta Economic Zone
- Pearl River
- Bocca Tigris
- Metropolitan regions of China
- Yangtze River Delta
- Yellow River Delta and Bohai Sea
- National Central City
- Special Economic Zones of China
- South China
