= Yunnan People's Publishing House =

Chinese publishing house in Yunnan

Yunnan People’s Publishing House
- Industry: Publishing
- Founded: December 25, 1950
- Headquarters: Kunming, Yunnan

Yunnan People's Publishing House (Chinese: 云南人民出版社) is a publishing company based in Kunming, Yunnan, China, established on December 25, 1950. It is the only general publishing company of Yunnan Province.
