= Guangxi Sanhuan =

Chinese ceramics manufacturer

Guangxi Sanhuan Enterprise Group Holding Company Limited
- Company type: private
- Industry: ceramics
- Founded: 1987
- Headquarters: Beiliu, Guangxi, China
- Products: table and dining ware
- Number of employees: 8000
- Website: Guangxi Sanhuan Group (English)

Guangxi Sanhuan Group (Chinese: 广西三环; pinyin: Guǎngxī Sānhuán) is a Chinese ceramics manufacturer. In 2010, the company was selected among a crowded field of competitors to be the official tableware provider for the royal wedding of Prince William of Wales and Kate Middleton. For use at the wedding and as souvenirs, 16,000 items, including dining plates, coffee cup and saucer sets, commemorative mugs and souvenir plates will be manufactured.

== History ==
The company was established in 1987 and made the transition from state owned enterprise to private company.
