= Sun Yat-sen University Cancer Center =

Sun Yat-sen University Cancer Center 中山大学肿瘤防治中心

Geography
- Location: 651 Dongfeng Road East, Guangzhou, China

Organisation
- Type: Specialist
- Affiliated university: Sun Yat-sen University

Services
- Beds: 1,600
- Speciality: Cancer

History
- Opened: 1964

Links
- Website: www.sysucc.org.cn
- Lists: Hospitals in China

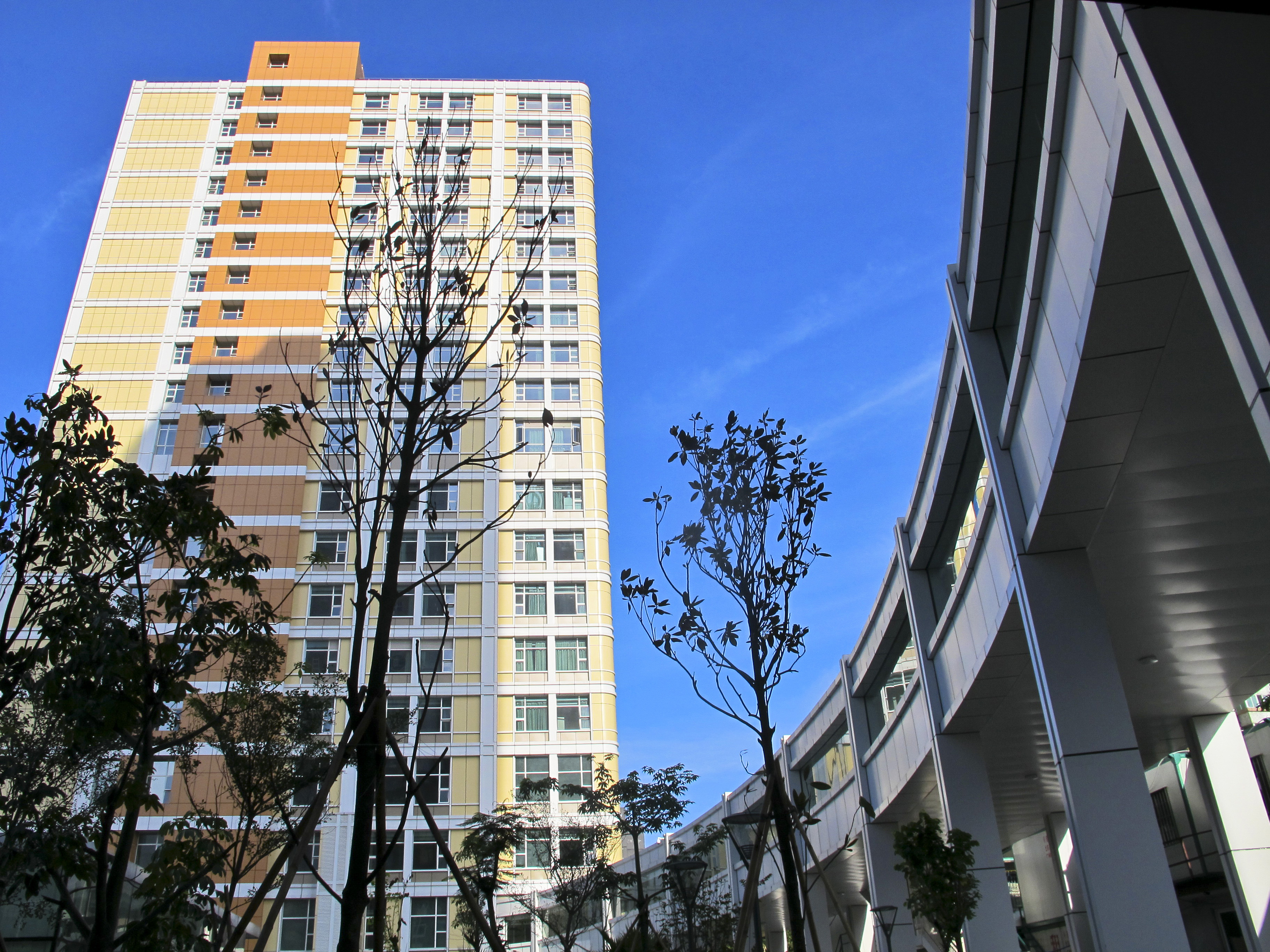
SYSUCC

Sun Yat-sen University Cancer Center (Chinese: 中山大学肿瘤防治中心;; pinyin: Zhōngshān Dàxué Zhǒngliú Fángzhì Zhōngxīn), abbreviated as SYSUCC, is a public hospital in Guangzhou, China. It is affiliated with Sun Yat-sen University.

The hospital was founded in March 1964. It is a Level III Class A hospital (the highest rank in China) and the largest integrated cancer center in southern China for care, research, education and prevention.

SYSUCC is ranked among the top three cancer center's in China, and is one of the best in Asia. The current President of the center is Dr. Xu Ruihua.

SYSUCC is a member of the Union for International Cancer Control (UICC).

== History ==
The predecessor of SYSUCC was the Tumor Hospital in South China. The founders were Professor Hsieh Chih Kuang (谢志光), a pioneer of clinical radiology and the founding father of radiation oncology in China, and Professor Liang Boqiang (梁伯强), the originator of modern pathology in China. In 1948, Hsieh Chih Kuang (Medical Doctor from University of Connecticut 1922) was recruited from PUMC (Peking Union Medical College), where he was a professor and head of the radiology department since 1928, to chair the radiology department at Lingang University. Since the early 1950s and with the help of Ke Lin, the Dean of the Zhongshan Medical School, they later established the Tumor Hospital in South China. The hospital opened its doors in March 1964 under the leadership of Hsieh Chih Kuang. A few days later a Cancer Institute was opened under the leadership of Liang Boqiang.

In 1966, the name of the hospital was changed to the Affiliated Cancer Hospital of Sun Yat-sen Medical College. The name was later changed again in 1985, to the Affiliated Cancer Hospital of Sun Yat-sen Medical University. Twenty-three years after both their respective establishments, in 1987, the Cancer Hospital and the Cancer Institute merged under the name Sun Yat-sen Medical University Cancer Center. The name was simplified in 2001 to Sun Yat-sen University Cancer Center.

== Research ==
According to the 2018 Nature Index report for global healthcare, the achievements of SYSUCC's active research environment were number 81 among the top 100 medical institutes in the world. "The Nature Index is a freely accessible database of author affiliation information collated from research articles published in an independently selected group of high-quality science journals."

=== State Key Laboratory of Oncology in South China ===
SYSUCC hosts the State Key Laboratory of Oncology in South China (SKL), which is national recognition for the highest degree of expertise. It was founded in 2005 by the Ministry of Science and Technology in China. The laboratory is integrated into SYSUCC and its activities cover a broad spectrum in oncology from basic to translational and clinical research. There are 269 SKLs in China, 26 of them are dedicated to medicine and only seven are cancer related.

=== Biobank ===
In 2001, SYSUCC established a biobank to collect peripheral blood, bone marrow, and tissue samples after surgery, along with other clinical information from cancer patients. They have the largest number of nasopharyngeal carcinoma samples in the world. SYSUCC is establishing a new automatic bio-sample storage retrieval system capable of storing up to 6 million samples.

=== Clinical Trials Center ===
SYSUCC has its own Clinical Trials Center (CTC) to assist physicians and scientists to test new therapies. It includes a National Clinical Study Center for Anticancer Drugs and a National Key Laboratory of Anti-cancer Drug Development. The CTC is CFDA certified.

=== Scientific journal ===
SYSUCC sponsors Cancer Communications, an oncology journal published in English formerly known as the Chinese Journal of Cancer. It publishes basic, clinical and translational cancer research. In 2014, it became Science Citation Indexed (SCI), it has a current Impact Factor (IF) of 3.822. The Editorial Board consists of members from around the world.

== Global Network ==
SYSUCC has established collaborative and friendly relationships with many renowned international institutes from around the world.

SYSUCC has been a sister institute with MD Anderson Cancer Center since 2003. The purpose is to create collaborative oncology research projects between MDACC and other sister institutes in the fight against cancer. In 2004, SYSUCC set up a joint laboratory with the Karolinska Institutet of Sweden for research in immunotherapy, molecular virology and oncological epidemiology.

SYSUCC signed a Memorandum of Understanding (MoU) with the UK's University of Warwick in 2015, creating a partnership in cancer diagnosis, care and research. SYSUCC and the University of Warwick are exploring opportunities in regards to digital pathology, nursing, and anti-cancer drug research.

In 2017, SYSUCC and Fred Hutchinson Cancer Research Center signed a broad five-year Memorandum of Understanding to carryout research on cancer diagnosis and treatment.
