= Global Innovation Index =

Index for innovation

- Report cover of the Global Innovation Index Report 2026
- Language: English, French, Italian, Spanish, Arabic, Chinese, Russian, German, Korean, Portuguese, Japanese

Publication details
- History: 2007–present
- Publisher: World Intellectual Property Organization
- Frequency: Annual
- License: CC BY 4.0

Standard abbreviations
- ISO 4: Glob. Innov. Index

Indexing
- ISSN: 2263-3693

Links
- wipo.int/global_innovation_index; globalinnovationindex.org

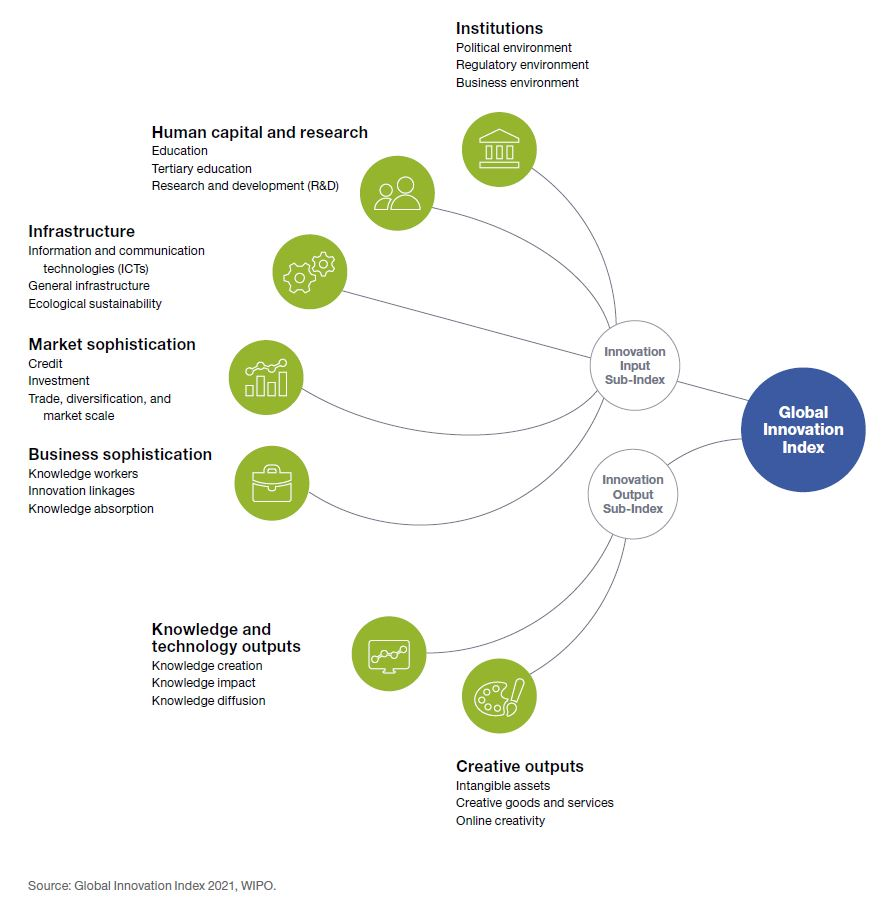
Framework showing the elements of the index

The Global Innovation Index is an annual ranking of countries by their capacity for and success in innovation, published by the World Intellectual Property Organization (WIPO). It was started in 2007 by INSEAD and World Business, a British magazine. Until 2021, it was published by WIPO in partnership with Cornell University, INSEAD, and other organisations and institutions. It is based on both subjective and objective data derived from several sources, including the International Telecommunication Union, the World Bank, and the World Economic Forum.

== History ==
The Global Innovation Index was started in 2007 by INSEAD and World Business, a British magazine. It was created by Soumitra Dutta.

== Methodology ==
The Global Innovation Index is computed by taking a simple average of the scores in two sub-indices (the Innovation Input Index and Innovation Output Index), which are composed of respectively five and two pillars. Each of those pillars describes an attribute of innovation and have to five indicators, and their score is calculated by the weighted average method.

Since its inception in 2007, the index has had its results analyzed by an increasing number of governments annually, which design policy responses to improve their performance. The index is mentioned in a resolution on science, technology and innovation for sustainable development adopted on 19 December 2019 by the General Assembly of the United Nations.

== Criticism ==
Several scholars have criticized the index for giving excessive significance attributed to factors that are not integral to innovation. For instance, "Ease of Paying Taxes", "Electricity Output" (half-weightage), and "Ease of Protecting Minority Investors" are factors alongside "Ease of Getting Credit" and "Venture Capital Deals." A 2024 study by Sarcina, Paolantonio, Valentini, and Iannone argued that the analysis of the GII pillars is "too aggregated to provide the necessary visibility of the determinants of innovation performance." The research found that indicators within a single pillar "contribute with different weights and have different statistical significance." The authors suggested that the model for calculating the ranking should be redefined to not only consider the "most statistically representative variables" but also to include "geographical, demographic, and socio-economic factors," noting that the importance of various innovation determinants likely differs between countries at different stages of development.

== Editions and themes ==
Every two years, the index covers a theme related to innovation that goes beyond the innovation rankings. In 2020, the theme was "Who will finance innovation?" and shed light on the state of innovation financing by investigating the evolution of existing mechanisms and by pointing to progress and remaining challenges. Previous themes covered topics such as health innovation, environmental innovation, and agricultural and food innovation.

The editions of the Global Innovation Index published between 2011 and 2026 are the following:

- 2011: Global Innovation Index 2011: Accelerating Growth and Development. Addressed the role of innovation-oriented policies in economic growth and development. Included 125 economies.
- 2012: Global Innovation Index 2012: Stronger Innovation Linkages for Global Growth. Analyzed the linkages among innovation actors as drivers of global economic growth. Included 141 economies.
- 2013: Global Innovation Index 2013: The Local Dynamics of Innovation. Studied the local dimension of innovation and its relationship with growth and development. Included 142 economies.
- 2014: Global Innovation Index 2014: The Human Factor in Innovation. Examined the role of people and teams in the innovation process, including skilled labor, talent retention and the mobilization of highly educated people. Included 143 economies.
- 2015: Global Innovation Index 2015: Effective Innovation Policies for Development. Explored the effect of innovation policies on economic growth and the strategies of high-income and developing countries. Included 141 economies.
- 2016: Global Innovation Index 2016: Winning with Global Innovation. Explored the impact of innovation-oriented policies on growth and development, and how different countries did or did not improve their capacity to innovate. Included 128 economies.
- 2017: Global Innovation Index 2017: Innovation Feeding the World. This edition reviewed the state of innovation in agriculture and food systems across different sectors and regions. Included 127 economies.
- 2018: Global Innovation Index 2018: Energizing the World with Innovation. Analyzed the landscape of energy innovation in the following decade, from production to consumption, and the rise of small-scale renewable systems. Included 126 economies.
- 2019: Global Innovation Index 2019: Creating Healthy Lives — The Future of Medical Innovation. Studied how medical innovation, both technological and non-technological, is transforming health care and its possible influence on economic growth. Included 129 economies.
- 2020: Global Innovation Index 2020: Who Will Finance Innovation? This edition addressed the evolution of innovation financing mechanisms for entrepreneurs and innovators, with their advances and challenges, in the context of the economic crisis caused by the COVID-19 pandemic. Included 131 economies.
- 2021: Global Innovation Index 2021: Tracking Innovation through the COVID-19 Crisis. This edition introduced a new section, the "Global Innovation Tracker", which assessed the impact of the COVID-19 pandemic on indicators such as spending on research and development and access to financing for innovation. Included 132 economies.
- 2022: Global Innovation Index 2022: What is the future of innovation-driven growth? Focused on the effect of innovation on productivity and societal well-being in the following decades, against a backdrop of the pandemic and slowing productivity growth. Included 132 economies.
- 2023: Global Innovation Index 2023: Innovation in the face of uncertainty. This year's edition analyzed innovation trends in an environment of economic and geopolitical uncertainty, with reduced venture capital investment and new opportunities in the digital age and "deep science". Included 132 economies.
- 2024: Global Innovation Index 2024: Unlocking the Promise of Social Entrepreneurship. In this edition, WIPO examined how new social entrepreneurship ventures offered innovative solutions to critical social problems and how to scale their impact. Included 133 economies.

== 2026 Ranking ==
The 2026 ranking was released on September 29 as part of the report titled Global Innovation Index 2026: Powering Entrepreneurs at the Frontier of Science. The ranking covered 139 economies and used around 80 indicators. According to estimates for that year, global R&D expenditure grew by more than 3.3% in real terms in 2025, and the estimation for 2026 is that it will expand by 3.6% to $3.4 trillion. The 2026 ranking was led by Switzerland, Sweden, the United States, South Korea, and Singapore.

The report identified more than 30,000 deep-science startups founded since 2000, with a combined valuation of $7.6 trillion.

Global Innovation Index, 2026
Rank	Country and region	Score	Income group	Region
1	Switzerland	66.7	High-income	Europe
2	Sweden	63.2	High-income	Europe
3	United States	62.3	High-income	Northern America
4	South Korea	61.4	High-income	South East Asia, East Asia, and Oceania
5	Singapore	61.0	High-income	South East Asia, East Asia, and Oceania
6	United Kingdom	59.6	High-income	Europe
7	Netherlands	58.4	High-income	Europe
8	Finland	57.9	High-income	Europe
9	Denmark	57.7	High-income	Europe
10	China	57.0	Upper middle-income	South East Asia, East Asia, and Oceania
11	Germany	56.8	High-income	Europe
12	Japan	54.1	High-income	South East Asia, East Asia, and Oceania
13	France	54.0	High-income	Europe
14	Hong Kong	53.2	High-income	South East Asia, East Asia, and Oceania
15	Israel	52.2	High-income	Northern Africa and Western Asia
16	Canada	51.1	High-income	Northern America
17	Estonia	50.4	High-income	Europe
18	Austria	50.2	High-income	Europe
19	Ireland	50.1	High-income	Europe
20	Australia	49.6	High-income	South East Asia, East Asia, and Oceania
21	Norway	48.5	High-income	Europe
22	Belgium	48.5	High-income	Europe
23	Luxembourg	46.6	High-income	Europe
24	New Zealand	46.4	High-income	South East Asia, East Asia, and Oceania
25	United Arab Emirates	46.4	High-income	Northern Africa and Western Asia
26	Iceland	46.3	High-income	Europe
27	Italy	46.2	High-income	Europe
28	Spain	45.4	High-income	Europe
29	Cyprus	45.3	High-income	Northern Africa and Western Asia
30	Portugal	44.5	High-income	Europe
31	Malta	43.8	High-income	Europe
32	Lithuania	43.2	High-income	Europe
33	Czech Republic	42.8	High-income	Europe
34	Malaysia	41.8	Upper middle-income	South East Asia, East Asia, and Oceania
35	Slovenia	41.1	High-income	Europe
36	Hungary	40.7	High-income	Europe
37	Bulgaria	40.3	High-income	Europe
38	India	40.1	Lower middle-income	Central and Southern Asia
39	Poland	39.5	High-income	Europe
40	Latvia	38.3	High-income	Europe
41	Greece	38.2	High-income	Europe
42	Saudi Arabia	37.9	High-income	Northern Africa and Western Asia
43	Vietnam	37.7	Lower middle-income	South East Asia, East Asia, and Oceania
44	Thailand	37.6	Upper middle-income	South East Asia, East Asia, and Oceania
45	Turkey	37.5	Upper middle-income	Northern Africa and Western Asia
46	Croatia	36.9	High-income	Europe
47	Qatar	36.6	High-income	Northern Africa and Western Asia
48	Slovakia	36.5	High-income	Europe
49	Romania	35.3	High-income	Europe
50	Mauritius	34.1	Upper middle-income	Sub-Saharan Africa
51	Chile	33.8	High-income	Latin America and the Caribbean
52	Philippines	33.8	Lower middle-income	South East Asia, East Asia, and Oceania
53	Brazil	33.5	Upper middle-income	Latin America and the Caribbean
54	Morocco	32.8	Lower middle-income	Northern Africa and Western Asia
55	Indonesia	32.7	Upper middle-income	South East Asia, East Asia, and Oceania
56	Serbia	32.5	Upper middle-income	Europe
57	Georgia	32.2	Upper middle-income	Northern Africa and Western Asia
58	Russia	31.8	High-income	Europe
59	Armenia	31.6	Upper middle-income	Northern Africa and Western Asia
60	Jordan	31.5	Lower middle-income	Northern Africa and Western Asia
61	North Macedonia	31.2	Upper middle-income	Europe
62	Kuwait	30.9	High-income	Northern Africa and Western Asia
63	South Africa	30.9	Upper middle-income	Sub-Saharan Africa
64	Bahrain	30.8	High-income	Northern Africa and Western Asia
65	Mexico	30.6	Upper middle-income	Latin America and the Caribbean
66	Uruguay	30.5	High-income	Latin America and the Caribbean
67	Ukraine	30.4	Upper middle-income	Europe
68	Moldova	30.3	Upper middle-income	Europe
69	Oman	30.0	High-income	Northern Africa and Western Asia
70	Costa Rica	29.8	High-income	Latin America and the Caribbean
71	Tunisia	29.3	Lower middle-income	Northern Africa and Western Asia
72	Mongolia	29.1	Upper middle-income	South East Asia, East Asia, and Oceania
73	Kazakhstan	29.1	Upper middle-income	Central and Southern Asia
74	Bhutan	28.9	Lower middle-income	Central and Southern Asia
75	Argentina	28.8	Upper middle-income	Latin America and the Caribbean
76	Montenegro	28.8	Upper middle-income	Europe
77	Uzbekistan	28.7	Lower middle-income	Central and Southern Asia
78	Colombia	28.6	Upper middle-income	Latin America and the Caribbean
79	Albania	28.3	Upper middle-income	Europe
80	Peru	27.9	Upper middle-income	Latin America and the Caribbean
81	Iran	27.6	Upper middle-income	Central and Southern Asia
82	Botswana	27.1	Upper middle-income	Sub-Saharan Africa
83	Egypt	26.1	Lower middle-income	Northern Africa and Western Asia
84	Bosnia and Herzegovina	26.1	Upper middle-income	Europe
85	Azerbaijan	25.8	Upper middle-income	Northern Africa and Western Asia
86	Lebanon	25.6	Lower middle-income	Northern Africa and Western Asia
87	Jamaica	24.9	Upper middle-income	Latin America and the Caribbean
88	Belarus	24.5	Upper middle-income	Europe
89	Panama	24.4	High-income	Latin America and the Caribbean
90	Senegal	24.4	Lower middle-income	Sub-Saharan Africa
91	Barbados	24.2	High-income	Latin America and the Caribbean
92	Kyrgyzstan	24.1	Lower middle-income	Central and Southern Asia
93	Cambodia	23.8	Lower middle-income	South East Asia, East Asia, and Oceania
94	Sri Lanka	23.7	Lower middle-income	Central and Southern Asia
95	Pakistan	23.7	Lower middle-income	Central and Southern Asia
96	Rwanda	23.3	Low-income	Sub-Saharan Africa
97	Kenya	23.0	Lower middle-income	Sub-Saharan Africa
98	Brunei	23.0	High-income	South East Asia, East Asia, and Oceania
99	Dominican Republic	22.9	Upper middle-income	Latin America and the Caribbean
100	El Salvador	22.8	Upper middle-income	Latin America and the Caribbean
101	Ghana	22.6	Lower middle-income	Sub-Saharan Africa
102	Namibia	22.5	Lower middle-income	Sub-Saharan Africa
103	Cape Verde	22.4	Upper middle-income	Sub-Saharan Africa
104	Nepal	22.3	Lower middle-income	Central and Southern Asia
105	Bangladesh	21.5	Lower middle-income	Central and Southern Asia
106	Ecuador	21.3	Upper middle-income	Latin America and the Caribbean
107	Trinidad and Tobago	21.2	High-income	Latin America and the Caribbean
108	Laos	21.2	Lower middle-income	South East Asia, East Asia, and Oceania
109	Paraguay	21.1	Upper middle-income	Latin America and the Caribbean
110	Ivory Coast	20.8	Lower middle-income	Sub-Saharan Africa
111	Algeria	20.5	Upper middle-income	Northern Africa and Western Asia
112	Tajikistan	20.3	Lower middle-income	Central and Southern Asia
113	Madagascar	20.2	Low-income	Sub-Saharan Africa
114	Bolivia	19.7	Lower middle-income	Latin America and the Caribbean
115	Zambia	19.5	Lower middle-income	Sub-Saharan Africa
116	Honduras	19.2	Lower middle-income	Latin America and the Caribbean
117	Benin	19.1	Lower middle-income	Sub-Saharan Africa
118	Nigeria	19.1	Lower middle-income	Sub-Saharan Africa
119	Tanzania	19.0	Lower middle-income	Sub-Saharan Africa
120	Guatemala	19.0	Upper middle-income	Latin America and the Caribbean
121	Cameroon	18.9	Lower middle-income	Sub-Saharan Africa
122	Togo	18.7	Low-income	Sub-Saharan Africa
123	Uganda	18.4	Low-income	Sub-Saharan Africa
124	Nicaragua	18.0	Lower middle-income	Latin America and the Caribbean
125	Myanmar	17.4	Lower middle-income	South East Asia, East Asia, and Oceania
126	Malawi	17.2	Low-income	Sub-Saharan Africa
127	Venezuela	16.7	-	Latin America and the Caribbean
128	Lesotho	16.5	Lower middle-income	Sub-Saharan Africa
129	Mozambique	16.1	Low-income	Sub-Saharan Africa
130	Burkina Faso	16.1	Low-income	Sub-Saharan Africa
131	Mauritania	16.1	Lower middle-income	Sub-Saharan Africa
132	Zimbabwe	16.1	Lower middle-income	Sub-Saharan Africa
133	Ethiopia	15.7	-	Sub-Saharan Africa
134	Mali	15.2	Low-income	Sub-Saharan Africa
135	Burundi	15.1	Low-income	Sub-Saharan Africa
136	Angola	13.0	Lower middle-income	Sub-Saharan Africa
137	Democratic Republic of the Congo	12.6	Low-income	Sub-Saharan Africa
138	Niger	12.1	Low-income	Sub-Saharan Africa
139	Chad	9.5	Low-income	Sub-Saharan Africa

== 2025 ranking ==
Economies climbing the ladder in global innovation. Top climbers since 2013 and 2019. Year-on-year comparisons of GII rankings must take into account changes to the GII model that have occurred over time, as well as data availability.

In 2025, for an economy to feature in the GII 2025, the minimum data coverage requirement is at least 35 indicators in the Innovation Input Sub-Index and 15 indicators in the Innovation Output Sub-Index, with scores for at least two sub-pillars per pillar. In the GII 2025, 139 economies had sufficient data available to be included in the Index. They represent 93.6 percent of the world's population. This year's conceptual framework includes 78 different indicators.

The Global Innovation Index 2025 scores 139 countries and regions.

Rank	Country and region	Score	Income group
1	Switzerland	66.0	High-income
2	Sweden	62.6	High-income
3	United States	61.7	High-income
4	South Korea	60.0	High-income
5	Singapore	59.9	High-income
6	United Kingdom	59.1	High-income
7	Finland	57.7	High-income
8	Netherlands	57.0	High-income
9	Denmark	56.9	High-income
10	China	56.6	Upper middle-income
11	Germany	55.5	High-income
12	Japan	53.6	High-income
13	France	53.4	High-income
14	Israel	52.3	High-income
15	Hong Kong	51.5	High-income
16	Estonia	51.1	High-income
17	Canada	51.1	High-income
18	Ireland	50.4	High-income
19	Austria	50.1	High-income
20	Norway	49.2	High-income
21	Belgium	48.5	High-income
22	Australia	48.0	High-income
23	Luxembourg	47.3	High-income
24	Iceland	47.0	High-income
25	New Zealand	45.5	High-income
26	Cyprus	45.5	High-income
27	Malta	45.4	High-income
28	Italy	44.9	High-income
29	Spain	44.6	High-income
30	United Arab Emirates	44.2	High-income
31	Portugal	43.9	High-income
32	Czech Republic	42.0	High-income
33	Lithuania	40.8	High-income
34	Malaysia	40.6	Upper middle-income
35	Slovenia	40.1	High-income
36	Hungary	40.0	High-income
37	Bulgaria	39.1	High-income
38	India	38.2	Lower middle-income
39	Poland	37.7	High-income
40	Croatia	37.7	High-income
41	Latvia	37.5	High-income
42	Greece	37.4	High-income
43	Turkey	37.2	Upper middle-income
44	Vietnam	37.1	Lower middle-income
45	Thailand	36.7	Upper middle-income
46	Saudi Arabia	36.0	High-income
47	Slovakia	35.5	High-income
48	Qatar	34.6	High-income
49	Romania	34.3	High-income
50	Philippines	33.6	Lower middle-income
51	Chile	33.1	High-income
52	Brazil	32.9	Upper middle-income
53	Mauritius	32.5	Upper middle-income
54	Serbia	31.7	Upper middle-income
55	Indonesia	31.3	Upper middle-income
56	Georgia	31.2	Upper middle-income
57	Morocco	31.1	Lower middle-income
58	Mexico	30.5	Upper middle-income
59	Armenia	30.5	Upper middle-income
60	Russia	30.3	High-income
61	South Africa	30.1	Upper middle-income
62	Bahrain	30.0	High-income
63	North Macedonia	29.8	Upper middle-income
64	Montenegro	29.8	Upper middle-income
65	Jordan	29.7	Lower middle-income
66	Ukraine	29.7	Upper middle-income
67	Albania	29.6	Upper middle-income
68	Uruguay	28.8	High-income
69	Oman	28.7	High-income
70	Iran	28.5	Upper middle-income
71	Colombia	28.5	Upper middle-income
72	Costa Rica	28.4	Upper middle-income
73	Kuwait	28.2	High-income
74	Moldova	27.4	Upper middle-income
75	Seychelles	27.2	High-income
76	Tunisia	27.0	Lower middle-income
77	Argentina	26.8	Upper middle-income
78	Mongolia	26.7	Upper middle-income
79	Uzbekistan	26.5	Lower middle-income
80	Peru	26.5	Upper middle-income
81	Kazakhstan	26.3	Upper middle-income
82	Panama	25.9	High-income
83	Jamaica	25.2	Upper middle-income
84	Barbados	25.1	High-income
85	Belarus	25.1	Upper middle-income
86	Egypt	24.7	Lower middle-income
87	Botswana	24.6	Upper middle-income
88	Brunei	24.5	High-income
89	Senegal	23.8	Lower middle-income
90	Lebanon	23.6	Lower middle-income
91	Namibia	23.5	Upper middle-income
92	Bosnia and Herzegovina	23.4	Upper middle-income
93	Sri Lanka	22.9	Lower middle-income
94	Azerbaijan	22.9	Upper middle-income
95	Cape Verde	22.6	Lower middle-income
96	Kyrgyzstan	22.6	Lower middle-income
97	Dominican Republic	22.6	Upper middle-income
98	El Salvador	22.2	Upper middle-income
99	Pakistan	22.1	Lower middle-income
100	Cambodia	21.9	Lower middle-income
101	Ghana	21.9	Lower middle-income
102	Paraguay	21.4	Upper middle-income
103	Kenya	21.4	Lower middle-income
104	Rwanda	21.1	Low-income
105	Nigeria	21.1	Lower middle-income
106	Bangladesh	21.0	Lower middle-income
107	Nepal	20.2	Lower middle-income
108	Tajikistan	20.2	Lower middle-income
109	Laos	20.1	Lower middle-income
110	Ivory Coast	19.7	Lower middle-income
111	Bolivia	19.6	Lower middle-income
112	Zambia	19.6	Lower middle-income
113	Ecuador	19.5	High-income
114	Trinidad and Tobago	19.3	High-income
115	Algeria	18.9	Upper middle-income
116	Cameroon	18.2	Lower middle-income
117	Togo	18.1	Low-income
118	Benin	17.8	Lower middle-income
119	Honduras	17.7	Lower middle-income
120	Madagascar	17.6	Low-income
121	Tanzania	17.5	Lower middle-income
122	Myanmar	17.3	Lower middle-income
123	Guatemala	17.1	Upper middle-income
124	Uganda	17.1	Low-income
125	Malawi	16.0	Low-income
126	Burkina Faso	15.9	Low-income
127	Burundi	15.8	Low-income
128	Mozambique	15.4	Low-income
129	Zimbabwe	15.4	Lower middle-income
130	Nicaragua	15.4	Lower middle-income
131	Mauritania	15.4	Lower middle-income
132	Lesotho	14.9	Lower middle-income
133	Guinea	14.9	Lower middle-income
134	Ethiopia	14.4	Low-income
135	Mali	14.0	Low-income
136	Venezuela	13.7	-
137	Republic of the Congo	13.6	Lower middle-income
138	Angola	13.0	Lower middle-income
139	Niger	11.9	Low-income

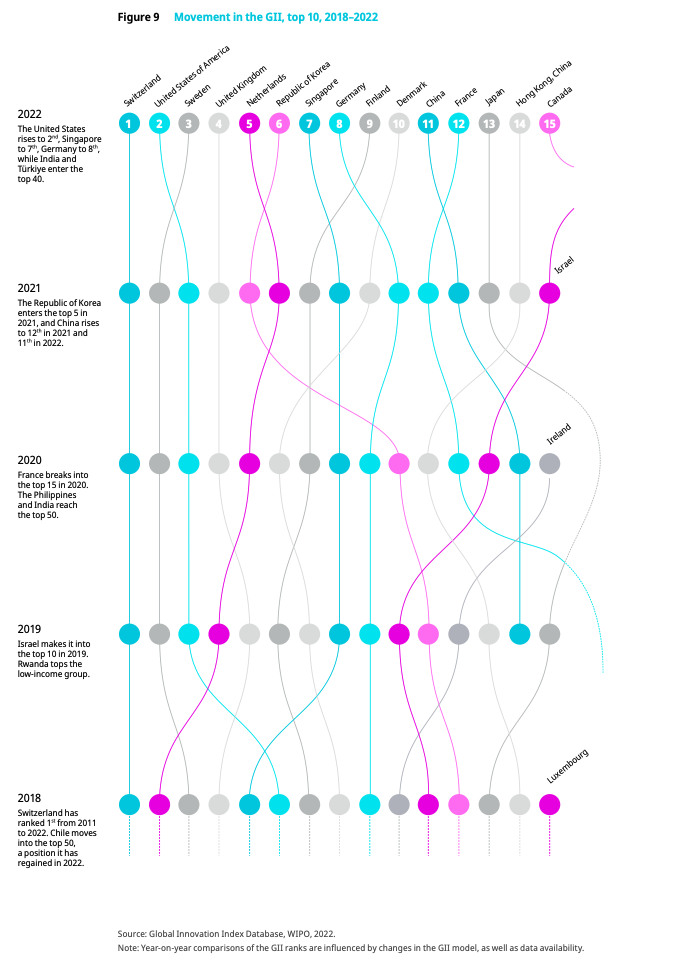
Movement in the Global Innovation Index top 10 countries and territories between 2018 and 2022

== See also ==
- International Innovation Index
- Innovation Cluster Ranking
