= Beiliu =

Beiliu 北流市 · Bwzliuz Si Paklow
- County-level city
- Location in Guangxi
- Coordinates: 22.708°N 110.354°E
- Country: China
- Autonomous region: Guangxi
- Prefecture-level city: Yulin
- Municipal seat: Lingcheng

Area
  - Total: 2,457 km^{2} (949 sq mi)

Population (2020)
  - Total: 1,211,637
  - Density: 493.1/km^{2} (1,277/sq mi)
- Time zone: UTC+8 (China Standard)

Beiliu (Chinese: 北流; pinyin: Běiliú; Zhuang: Bwzliuz) is a county-level city in the southeast of Guangxi, China. It is under the administration of Yulin city. As of 2016, it had a population of 1.5 million.

== Administrative divisions ==
Beiliu is divided into 3 subdistricts and 22 towns:

Subdistricts

- Lingcheng 陵城街道
- Chengnan 城南街道
- Chengbei 城北街道

Towns

- Beiliu 北流镇
- Xinrong 新荣镇
- Min'an 民安镇
- Shanwei 山围镇
- Minle 民乐镇
- Xilang 西埌镇
- Xinxu 新圩镇
- Dali 大里镇
- Tang'an 塘岸镇
- Qingshuikou 清水口镇
- Longsheng 隆盛镇
- Dapowai 大坡外镇
- Liuma 六麻镇
- Xinfeng 新丰镇
- Shadong 沙垌镇
- Pingzheng 平政镇
- Baima 白马镇
- Dalun 大伦镇
- Fuxin 扶新镇
- Liujing 六靖镇
- Shiwo 石窝镇
- Qingwan 清湾镇

== Economy ==
Guangxi Sanhuan, a large ceramics manufacturer, is headquartered in the city.

== Transport ==
- Luoyang–Zhanjiang Railway

== Climate ==
Climate data for Beiliu, elevation 155 m (509 ft), (1991–2020 normals, extremes 1981–2010)
Month	Jan	Feb	Mar	Apr	May	Jun	Jul	Aug	Sep	Oct	Nov	Dec	Year
Record high °C (°F)	28.9 (84.0)	32.8 (91.0)	34.3 (93.7)	34.6 (94.3)	35.8 (96.4)	37.2 (99.0)	38.3 (100.9)	38.1 (100.6)	37.9 (100.2)	35.7 (96.3)	33.7 (92.7)	29.4 (84.9)	38.3 (100.9)
Mean daily maximum °C (°F)	18.0 (64.4)	19.7 (67.5)	22.2 (72.0)	27.0 (80.6)	30.7 (87.3)	32.4 (90.3)	33.2 (91.8)	33.2 (91.8)	32.0 (89.6)	29.3 (84.7)	25.2 (77.4)	20.2 (68.4)	26.9 (80.5)
Daily mean °C (°F)	13.5 (56.3)	15.4 (59.7)	18.4 (65.1)	23.0 (73.4)	26.3 (79.3)	27.9 (82.2)	28.5 (83.3)	28.3 (82.9)	27.2 (81.0)	24.3 (75.7)	20.0 (68.0)	15.3 (59.5)	22.3 (72.2)
Mean daily minimum °C (°F)	10.6 (51.1)	12.6 (54.7)	15.7 (60.3)	20.2 (68.4)	23.2 (73.8)	25.0 (77.0)	25.4 (77.7)	25.1 (77.2)	23.9 (75.0)	20.7 (69.3)	16.5 (61.7)	12.0 (53.6)	19.2 (66.7)
Record low °C (°F)	1.2 (34.2)	1.7 (35.1)	2.0 (35.6)	8.9 (48.0)	13.7 (56.7)	18.0 (64.4)	20.2 (68.4)	21.3 (70.3)	15.5 (59.9)	10.4 (50.7)	4.9 (40.8)	−0.2 (31.6)	−0.2 (31.6)
Average precipitation mm (inches)	56.7 (2.23)	44.8 (1.76)	75.3 (2.96)	150.6 (5.93)	251.1 (9.89)	268.7 (10.58)	241.6 (9.51)	201.6 (7.94)	122.3 (4.81)	67.5 (2.66)	52.7 (2.07)	40.4 (1.59)	1,573.3 (61.93)
Average precipitation days (≥ 0.1 mm)	9.9	10.9	16.3	15.6	18.2	20.3	18.2	18.0	12.0	5.8	6.8	6.9	158.9
Average relative humidity (%)	75	77	81	80	80	81	79	80	76	70	69	68	76
Mean monthly sunshine hours	84.1	64.0	48.7	76.1	124.8	139.0	181.2	181.5	181.8	193.0	157.8	133.0	1,565
Percentage possible sunshine	25	20	13	20	30	34	44	46	50	54	48	40	35
Source: China Meteorological Administration
