= Qin Mu =

Chinese author and writer (1919–1992)

- 秦牧
- Born: Lin Ashu; 19 August 1919; British Hong Kong
- Died: 14 October 1992 (aged 73); Guangzhou, Guangdong, China
- Occupations: essayist, novelist
- Spouse: Zi Feng
- Writing career
- Language: Mandarin

Qin Mu (Chinese: 秦牧; 19 August 1919 – 14 October 1992), born Lin Ashu, also known as Lin Paiguang, Lin Juefu, and Lin Wanshi, was a Chinese educator and writer. He was best known for his essays, particularly Travels in Xinjiang which is included in Chinese high school textbooks. He also wrote novels, plays, poems and criticism. He was the vice editor-in-chief of Yangcheng Evening News and the head of Chinese at Jinan University. He said that in no way could a man of letters write any outstanding work if he was not dedicated to society and responsible for the people.

== Biography ==
Qin Mu was born in British Hong Kong, whose family line could be traced back to Dongli Town, Chenghai, Guangdong. He spent his childhood and youth in Malaysia and Singapore. He returned to China and pursued his studies in Chenghai, Shantou and Hong Kong. During the period of the Second Sino-Japanese War, he served as actor, worker in the battlefield, teacher, and editor. After the victory of the war, he led a literary life in Hong Kong for three years. After the foundation of People's Republic of China, he served as section chief of Education Department of Guangdong Province and editorial director of Zhonghua Book Company. He joined the Chinese Communist Party (CCP) in 1963. He died in 1992.

== During the Cultural Revolution ==
His collection of essays Collecting Shells in the Sea of the Arts (藝海拾貝) was published in 1962. In 1966 when the Cultural Revolution broke out, he became one of the targets of criticism. The campaign against the collection began. Teachers and students who engaged in the campaign denounced the collection as "poisonous grass", even though they had no understanding of what the collection was about and what "poisonous grass" meant. Afterwards, it was revealed that Qin wrote an article on Mao Zedong's return to Shaoshan, giving an account of Mao's visiting ancestral graves and his remarks before the tombs. The campaign then levelled criticism at the "capitalist roaders" within the CCP and he drew no public attention anymore.

== Works ==
- The Corpus of Qin Mu 《秦牧全集》
- The Collection of Sparks 《火種集》
- The Collection of Qin Mu's Essays 《秦牧散文集》
- Rainbow, Butterfly, Tree 《彩蝶樹》
- The Entire Collection of Qin Mu's Works of Children Literature 《秦牧兒童文學全集》
- The Selected Collection of Qin Mu's Essays 《秦牧散文選》
- The City of Flower 《花城》
- The Selected Collection of Qin Mu's Science Fiction 《秦牧科普作品選》
- Collecting Shells in the Sea of the Arts 《藝海拾貝》
- The Love of a Philosopher 《哲人的愛》
- Beneath the Wing of an International Airplane 《在國際飛機翼下》
- Road of Jade 《翡翠路》
- Drops of Forest 《森林水滴》
- Red Fruit of Forest in Autumn 《秋林紅果》
- The Selected Collection of Qin Mu's Works on Overseas Chinese 《秦牧華僑題材作品選》
- The Sculpture of a Dream Seeker 《尋夢者的塑像》
- A Lunatic's Speech before a Feast 《盛宴前的瘋子演說》
- Gigantic Hand 《巨手》
- Sea of Rage 《憤怒的海》

== See also ==
- List of Chinese authors
- Chinese Literature
