= Tuina (disambiguation) =

Tuina or Tui na is a Chinese form of massage therapy.

Tuina may also refer to:

- Tuina (moth), a moth genus in the family Erebidae
  - Tuina maurella, a moth species found in Costa Rica
  - Tuina cingulata, a moth species found in Mexico, Honduras and Guatemala
- Massage (novel), an award-winning 2008 Chinese novel by Bi Feiyu, translated to English in 2015
  - See Without Looking, a 2013 TV series based on Bi's novel
  - Blind Massage, a 2014 film based on Bi's novel
