= Massage (disambiguation) =

Massage is the rubbing or kneading of the body's soft tissues.

Massage may also refer to:

- Massage (novel)
- "Massage" (Barbara), a 2000 television episode
- "Massage" (Beavis and Butt-Head), a 2011 television episode
- "Massage" (Ghosts), a 1995 television episode
