= Howard Goldblatt =

American translator

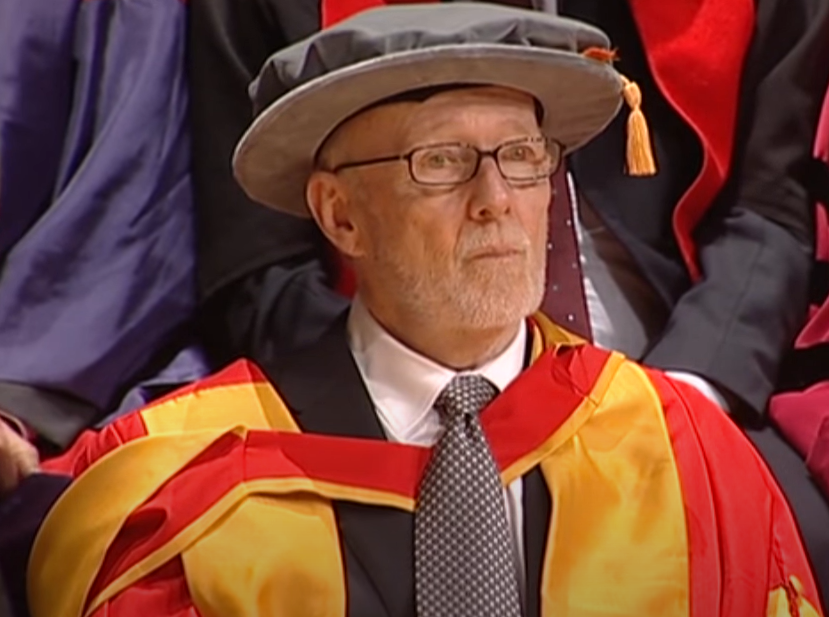
- Goldblatt in 2014
- Born: 1939 (age 86–87); California, United States
- Education: California State University, Long Beach; San Francisco State University; Indiana University Bloomington (PhD); National Taiwan Normal University
- Occupation: Translator
- Organization: University of Notre Dame
- Spouse: Sylvia Li-chun Lin

Chinese name
- Chinese: 葛浩文
Transcriptions
Standard Mandarin
- Hanyu Pinyin: Gě hàowén

Howard Goldblatt (Chinese: 葛浩文, born 1939) is an American literary translator of numerous works of contemporary Chinese (mainland China & Taiwan) fiction, including The Taste of Apples by Huang Chunming and The Execution of Mayor Yin by Chen Ruoxi. Goldblatt also translated works of Chinese novelist and 2012 Nobel Prize in Literature winner Mo Yan, including six of Mo Yan's novels and collections of stories. He was a research professor of Chinese at the University of Notre Dame from 2002 to 2011.

== Biography ==
Goldblatt encountered Chinese for the first time as a young man, during his tour of duty with the US Navy, sent to military base in Taiwan at the beginning of the 1960s. He stayed there and studied at the Mandarin Center for two more years before returning to the US. He then enrolled at the Chinese language program of the San Francisco State University. Goldblatt received a Bachelor of Arts from California State University, Long Beach, a Master of Arts from San Francisco State University in 1971, and a Doctor of Philosophy from Indiana University Bloomington in 1974.

Following criticism of Mo Yan's political stance after winning the Nobel Prize, Goldblatt wrote a defence of him in The Guardian.

He worked as a professor of Chinese literature at San Francisco State University, University of Colorado-Boulder and University of Notre Dame.

== Awards ==
- 2000 National Translation Award for translation of Notes of a Desolate Man by Chu T'ien-wen
- 2009 Guggenheim Fellowship

== Works ==
=== Selected translations ===
- Wang Anyi (1988). Lapse of Time. Translated by Howard Goldblatt. San Francisco: China Books and Periodicals. ISBN 0-8351-2032-5.
- Ai Bei (1990). Red Ivy, Green Earth Mother. Translated by Howard Goldblatt. Salt Lake City: Peregrine Smith Books. ISBN 0-595-00674-4.
- Li Ang (1994). The Butcher's Wife and Other Stories. Translated by Howard Goldblatt. Boston: Cheng & Tsui Company. ISBN 978-0-88727-222-6.
- Liu Heng (1994). Black Snow. Translated by Howard Goldblatt. New York: Grove Press. ISBN 978-0-8021-3389-2.
- Gu Hua (1996). Virgin Widows. Translated by Howard Goldblatt. Honolulu: University of Hawaii Press. ISBN 978-0-8248-1802-9.
- Ma Bo (1996). Blood Red Sunset: A Memoir of the Chinese Cultural Revolution. New York: Viking Press. ISBN 978-0-14-015942-4.
- Li Rui (1997). Silver City. Translated by Howard Goldblatt. New York: Metropolitan Books. ISBN 0-8050-4895-2.
- Wang Shuo (1998). Playing For Thrills. Translated by Howard Goldblatt. Penguin Books. ISBN 978-0-14-026971-0.
- Wang Zhenhe (1998). Rose, Rose, I Love You. Translated by Howard Goldblatt. New York: Columbia University Press. ISBN 978-0-231-11202-4.
- Chu T'ien-wen (1999). Notes of a Desolate Man. Translators Howard Goldblatt and Sylvia Li-chun Lin. New York: Columbia University Press. ISBN 978-0-231-11608-4. - American Literary Translators Association Translation of the Year
- Wang Shuo (2000). Please Don't Call Me Human. Translated by Howard Goldblatt. Hyperion East. ISBN 978-0-7868-6419-5.
- Mo Yan (2000). The Republic of Wine. Translated by Howard Goldblatt. Arcade Publishing. ISBN 978-1-55970-531-8.
- Hong Ying (2000). Daughter of the River. Translated by Howard Goldblatt. New York: Grove Press. ISBN 978-0-8021-3660-2.
- Huang Chunming (2001). The Taste of Apples. Translated by Howard Goldblatt. New York: Columbia University Press. ISBN 978-0-231-12261-0.
- Xiao Hong (2002). The Field of Life and Death & Tales of Hulan River. Translated by Howard Goldblatt. Boston: Cheng & Tsui Company. ISBN 978-0-88727-392-6.
- Liu Heng (2002). Green River Daydreams. Translated by Howard Goldblatt. New York: Grove Press. ISBN 978-0-8021-3904-7.
- Pingwa Jia (2003). Turbulence: A Novel. Translated by Howard Goldblatt. Grove Press. ISBN 978-0-8021-3972-6.
- Mo Yan (2003). Shifu, You'll Do Anything for a Laugh. Translated by Howard Goldblatt. London: Methuen Publishing. ISBN 978-0-413-77119-3.
- Alai (2003). Red Poppies. Translators Howard Goldblatt and Sylvia Li-chun Lin. Boston: Houghton Mifflin Harcourt. ISBN 978-0-618-34069-9.
- Mo Yan (2003). Red Sorghum. Translated by Howard Goldblatt. London: Arrow. ISBN 978-0-09-945167-9.
- Chun Sue (2004). Beijing Doll. Translated by Howard Goldblatt. Riverhead Books. ISBN 978-1-59448-020-1.
- Su Tong (2004). Rice. Translated by Howard Goldblatt. New York: Perennial. ISBN 0-06-059632-5.
- Chen Ruoxi (2004). The Execution of Mayor Yin and Other Stories from the Great Proletarian Cultural Revolution. Translators Nancy Ing, Howard Goldblatt. Indiana University Press. ISBN 978-0-253-34416-8.
- Mo Yan (2004). Big Breasts and Wide Hips. Translated by Howard Goldblatt. Arcade Publishing. ISBN 978-1-55970-672-8.
- Xiao Hong (2005). The Dyer's Daughter: Selected Stories of Xiao Hong. Translated by Howard Goldblatt. Hong Kong: Chinese University Press. ISBN 978-962-996-014-8.
- Aili Mu; Julie Chiu; Howard Goldblatt, eds. (2006). Loud Sparrows: Contemporary Chinese Short-Shorts. Translated by Howard Goldblatt. New York: Columbia University Press. ISBN 978-0-231-13848-2.
- Su Tong (2005). My Life as Emperor. Translated by Howard Goldblatt. Hyperion East. ISBN 978-1-4013-6666-7.
- Chu T'ien-hsin (2007). The Old Capital: A Novel of Taipei. Translated by Howard Goldblatt. New York: Columbia University Press. ISBN 978-0-231-14112-3.
- Bi Feiyu (2007). The Moon Opera. Translators Howard Goldblatt and Sylvia Li-chun Lin. London: Telegram. ISBN 978-0-15-101294-7.
- Mo Yan (2008). Life and Death Are Wearing Me Out. Translated by Howard Goldblatt. Arcade Publishing. ISBN 978-1-55970-853-1.
- Shih Shu-ching (2008). City of the Queen: A Novel of Colonial Hong Kong. Translators Howard Goldblatt and Sylvia Li-chun Lin. Hong Kong: Hong Kong University Press. ISBN 978-962-209-911-1.
- Su Tong (2009). Binu and the Great Wall of China. Translated by Howard Goldblatt. Edinburgh: Canongate Books. ISBN 978-1-84767-062-5.
- Bi Feiyu (2010). Three Sisters. Translators Howard Goldblatt and Sylvia Li-chun Lin. London: Telegram. ISBN 978-1-84659-023-8.
- Su Tong (2010). The Boat to Redemption. Translated by Howard Goldblatt. Black Swan. ISBN 978-0-552-77454-3.
- Lao She (2010). Rickshaw Boy. Translated by Howard Goldblatt. New York: HarperCollins. ISBN 978-0-06-143692-5.
- Mo Yan (2011). The Garlic Ballads. Translated by Howard Goldblatt. New York: Arcade Publishing. ISBN 978-1-61145-251-8.
- Jiang Rong (2008). Wolf Totem. Penguin. ISBN 978-1-59420-156-1.
- Mo Yan (2012). Change. Translated by Howard Goldblatt. London: Seagull Press. ISBN 978-1-906497-48-4.
- Ba Jin (2012). Ward Four: A Novel of Wartime China. Translated by Howard Goldblatt. San Francisco: China Books and Periodicals. ISBN 978-0-8351-0000-7.
- Xi Ni Er (2012). The Earnest Mask. Translators Howard Goldblatt and Sylvia Li-chun Lin. Singapore: Epigram Books. ISBN 978-981-07-3659-0.
- Wong Meng Voon (2012). Under the Bed, Confusion. Translated by Howard Goldblatt. Singapore: Epigram Books. ISBN 978-981-07-3661-3.
- Mo Yan (2012). Pow!. Translated by Howard Goldblatt. London: Seagull Press. ISBN 978-0-85742-076-3.
- Mo Yan (2013). Sandalwood Death. Translated by Howard Goldblatt. Oklahoma: University of Oklahoma Press. ISBN 978-0-8061-4339-2.
- Alai (2013). The Song of King Gesar. Translators Howard Goldblatt and Sylvia Li-chun Lin. New South Wales: Allen & Unwin. ISBN 978-1-84767-235-3.
- Yeng Pway Ngon (2014). Trivialities About Me and Myself. Translated by Howard Goldblatt. Singapore: Epigram Books. ISBN 978-981-4615-10-5.
- Liu Zhenyun (2014). I Did Not Kill My Husband. Translators Howard Goldblatt and Sylvia Li-chun Lin. New York: Arcade Publishing. ISBN 978-1-62872-426-4.
- Mo Yan (2015). Frog. Translated by Howard Goldblatt. New York: Viking Press. ISBN 978-0-525-42798-8.

=== Edited volumes ===
- Joseph S. M. Lau; Howard Goldblatt, eds. (1996). Columbia Anthology of Modern Chinese Literature. Columbia University Press. ISBN 978-0-231-13841-3.
- Chairman Mao Would Not Be Amused: Fiction from Today's China. Grove Press. 1996. ISBN 978-0-8021-3449-3.
