= Sylvia Li-chun Lin =

Chinese-English translator and academic

- Born: Shanhua, Tainan, Taiwan
- Spouse: Howard Goldblatt

Academic background
- Education: Tamkang University; St. John's University; University of Oregon; University of California, Berkeley (Ph.D.)

Academic work
- Institutions: University of Colorado, Boulder; University of Notre Dame

Chinese name
- Traditional Chinese: 林麗君
- Simplified Chinese: 林丽君
Transcriptions
Standard Mandarin
- Hanyu Pinyin: Lín Lìjūn
- Wade–Giles: Lin^{2} Li^{4}-chün^{1}

Sylvia Li-chun Lin (Shanhua, Tainan, Taiwan) is a Taiwanese-born Chinese–English translator and a former associate professor of Chinese Literature at the University of Colorado Boulder and the University of Notre Dame. She has translated over a dozen novels with Howard Goldblatt.

== Awards ==
- Liang Shih-chiu Literary Translation Prize
- 2000 – National Translation Award for translation of Notes of a Desolate Man by Chu T’ien-wen
- 2011 – Man Asian Literary Prize for Three Sisters by Bi Feiyu

== Works ==
=== Translations ===
Author	English title	Original title	Notes
Chu T’ien-wen	Notes of a Desolate Man	荒人手記	with Howard Goldblatt
Bi Feiyu	The Moon Opera	青衣	with Howard Goldblatt
Bi Feiyu	Three Sisters	玉米	with Howard Goldblatt
Bi Feiyu	Massage	推拿	with Howard Goldblatt
Liu Zhenyun	The Cook, the Crook, and the Real Estate Tycoon	我叫刘跃进	with Howard Goldblatt
Liu Zhenyun	I Did Not Kill My Husband	我不是潘金莲	with Howard Goldblatt
Liu Zhenyun	Remembering 1942	温故一九四二	with Howard Goldblatt
Shih Shu-ching	City of the Queen	她名叫蝴蝶	with Howard Goldblatt
Li Ang	The Lost Garden	迷園	with Howard Goldblatt
Alai	The Song of King Gesar	格萨尔王	with Howard Goldblatt
Alai	Red Poppies	尘埃落定	with Howard Goldblatt
Xi Ni Er	The Ernest Mask	认真面具	with Howard Goldblatt
Li Yung-p'ing	Retribution: the Jiling Chronicles	吉陵春秋	with Howard Goldblatt
Song Ying	Apricot's Revenge	杏烧红	with Howard Goldblatt
Beila	The Cursed Piano	魔咒钢琴	with Howard Goldblatt
You Jin	Teaching Cats to Jump Hoops	听, 青春在哭泣	with Howard Goldblatt

=== Academic ===
- Representing Atrocity: The 2/28 Incident and White Terror in Fiction and Film. Columbia University Press. 2007. ISBN 978-0-231-14360-8.
- Push Open the Door: Poetry from Contemporary China. Copper Canyon Press 2011. ISBN 978-1556593307.
- Documenting Taiwan on Film: Issues and Methods in New Documentaries. Routledge. 2012. ISBN 978-0-415-68511-5. (co-edited with Tze-lan D. Sang)

== Sources ==
- Cohorst, Kate (2011-05-06). "Chinese Professors Make Winning Translation Team". University of Notre Dame.
- "Sylvia Li–chun Lin, Assistant Professor". University of Notre Dame. Archived from the original on 2008-04-13.
