= Gilroy v Flynn =

Irish Supreme Court case

- Coat of arms of Ireland
- Court: Supreme Court of Ireland
- Full case name: Mark John Gilroy v Mary Flynn
- Decided: 3 December 2004
- Citation: [2004] IESC 98; [2005] 1 ILRM 290
- Transcript: https://www.bailii.org/ie/cases/IESC/2004/98.html

Case history
- Appealed from: High Court
- Appealed to: Supreme Court

Court membership
- Judges sitting: Denham J, Hardiman J, Fennelly J

Case opinions
- Excessive delays in the delivery of a statement of claim are no longer acceptable even where the fault of the delay lies with a professional adviser, and not the plaintiff.
- Decision by: Hardiman J

Keywords
- Civil Procedure; delay; Practice and Procedure; Statement of Claim; Costs

Gilroy v Flynn [2004] IESC 98; [2005] 1 ILRM 290 was an Irish Supreme Court case in which the court made it clear that excessive delays in the delivery of a statement of claim were unacceptable and could justify dismissing a case. While the court allowed the appeal against the High Court central to this case to proceed, it effectively reversed the previous "assumption that even grave delay will not lead to the dismissal of an action" even where the fault of the delay lay with a legal adviser rather than the plaintiff.

== Background ==
The plaintiff was involved in an accident in September 1997. She issued proceedings through her solicitor in August 2000 and served them on the defendant's solicitors in January 2001 who sought a statement of claim by letter dated 6 February 2001. Following repeated requests for the statement of claim, the defendant's solicitor filed a motion with the High Court which extended the time for delivery of the statement of claim on consent by three weeks on 30 November 2001.

The defendant's solicitor, having not received the statement of claim following several requests for it, filed a further motion to the Master of the High Court which "dismissed the plaintiff's claim for want of prosecution" on 27 June 2002. The plaintiff appealed to the High Court which affirmed the order of the Master of the High Court in January 2003. The plaintiff then appealed the decision of the High Court to the Supreme Court.

== The Supreme Court ==
The Supreme Court decision was delivered by Hardiman J., with Denham and Fennelly JJ. concurring, on 3 December 2004.

The Supreme Court allowed the appeal. However, it stressed that similar cases in the future may not be decided so favorably to the plaintiff as the present one. It stated that the Courts are increasingly unwilling to allow the possible injustice that may accrue from "dilatoriness". It went on to cite developments in the law since the case of Primor plc v Stokes Kennedy Crowley. Order 27 of the Rules of the Superior Courts had been amended to oblige the Court, on the hearing of second applications for dismissal of an action for a delay in delivering a statement of claim, to dismiss the action unless special circumstances exist. In addition, the European Convention on Human Rights Act 2003 puts an obligation on the Courts to "ensure that rights and liabilities ... are determined within a reasonable time".

In the circumstances, the Courts allowed the appeal and gave the plaintiff's one week to file the statement of claim. However, it was clear that similar cases in the future "may not prove as easy" for "dilatory" plaintiffs.

== Subsequent developments ==
Courts have since become even more strict and are now more likely to strike out a case for inordinate and inexcusable delay. Gilroy forms the core of the decision in Stephens v Paul Flynn Ltd [2005] IEHC 148. The High Court recently struck out a case for want of prosecution where the delay was less than one year.
