= Centralisation =

Process by which control becomes more concentrated

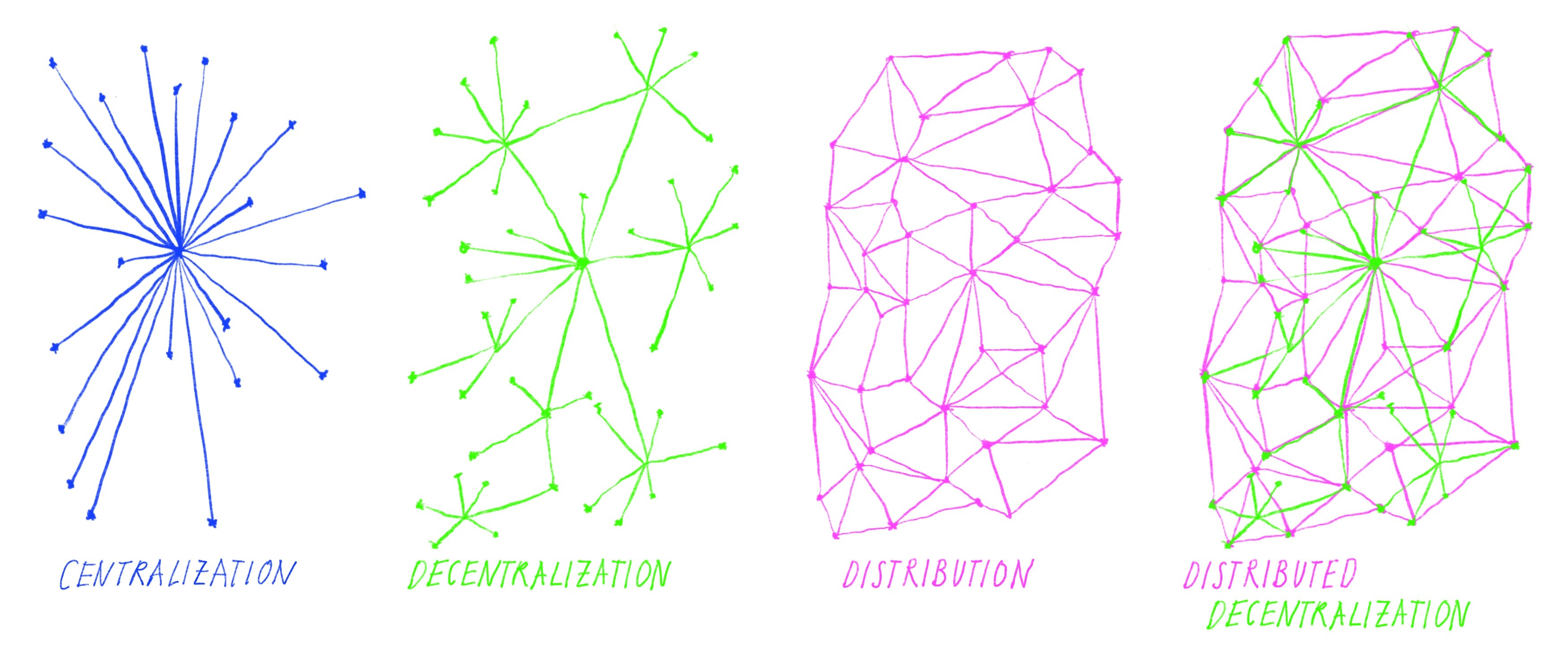
Diagrams of systems in various degrees of centralisation. From left to right: centralisation, decentralisation, distribution, and distributed decentralisation.

Centralisation or centralization (American English) is the process by which the activities of an organisation, particularly those regarding planning, decision-making, and framing strategies and policies, become concentrated within a particular group within that organisation. This creates a power structure where the said group occupies the highest level of hierarchy and has significantly more authority and influence over the other groups, who are considered its subordinates.

An antonym of centralisation is decentralisation, where authority is shared among numerous different groups, allowing varying degree of autonomy for each.

The term has a variety of meanings in several fields. In political science, centralisation refers to the concentration of a government's power—both geographically and politically—into a centralised government, which has sovereignty over all its administrative divisions. Conversely, a decentralised system of government often has significant separation of powers and local self-governance.

== Centralisation in politics ==
=== History of the centralisation of authority ===
Centralisation of authority is the systematic and consistent concentration of authority at a central point or in a person within the organization. This idea was first introduced in the Qin dynasty of China. The Qin government was highly bureaucratic and was administered by a hierarchy of officials, all serving the First Emperor, Qin Shi Huang. The Qin dynasty practised all the things that Han Feizi taught, allowing Qin Shi Huang to own and control all his territories, including those conquered from other countries. Zheng and his advisers ended feudalism in China by setting up new laws and regulations under a centralised and bureaucratic government with a rigid centralisation of authority.

=== Features of centralisation of authority in ancient Chinese government ===
- In the ancient Chinese government, the monarchical power was the supreme power in the empire. The emperor monopolised all the resources in the country; his personality and abilities decide the prosperity of the country. This autocratic system allows for faster decision-making and avoids complex solutions to problems that arise. One disadvantage is that courtiers, who compete for the emperor's favor, could amass power for themselves, leading to internal strife. (Jin and Liu, 1992)
- The administrative department had highly centralised powers. The duties of each bureaucratic occupation were not clearly defined, leading to inefficiencies as functionaries managed the government and effectively ruled the country.

=== Idea of centralisation of authority ===
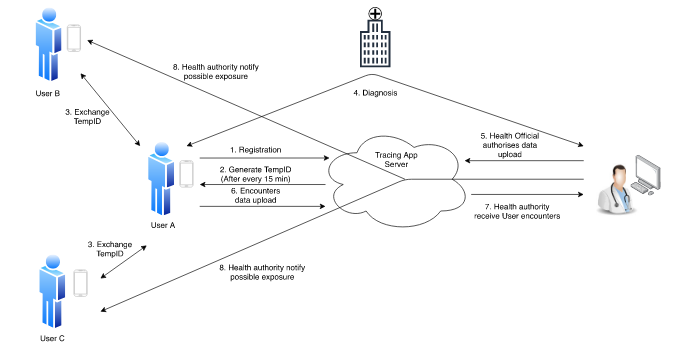
A diagram of a centralised health tracing system (in French)

The acts for the implementation are needed after delegation. Therefore, the authority for taking the decisions can be spread with the help of the delegation of the authority.

The centralisation of authority can be done immediately, if complete concentration is given at the decision-making stage for any position. The centralisation can be done with a position or at a level in an organisation. Ideally, the decision-making power is held by a few individuals.

=== Advantages and disadvantages of the centralisation of authority ===
Centralisation of authority has several advantages and disadvantages. The benefits include:

1. Responsibilities and duties are well defined within the central governing body.
2. Decision-making is very direct and clear.
3. The central power maintains a large "encompassing interest" in the welfare of the state it rules since it stands to benefit from any increase in the state's wealth and/or power. In this sense, the incentives of state and ruler are aligned.

Disadvantages, on the other hand are as follows:

1. Decisions may be misunderstood while being passed on and lower position departments do not have the decision-making power, therefore it requires an efficient and well-organised top department.
2. Attention and support for each department or city may not be balanced.
3. Delay of work information may result in inefficiency of the government.
4. Discrepancies in the economy and information resources between the centre and other places are significant.
5. Excludes actors at the local and provincial levels from the prevailing system of governance, reducing the capacity of the central government to hold the authority accountable (with risks of corruption), resolve disputes or design effective policies requiring local knowledge and expertise.

== Centralisation in economy ==
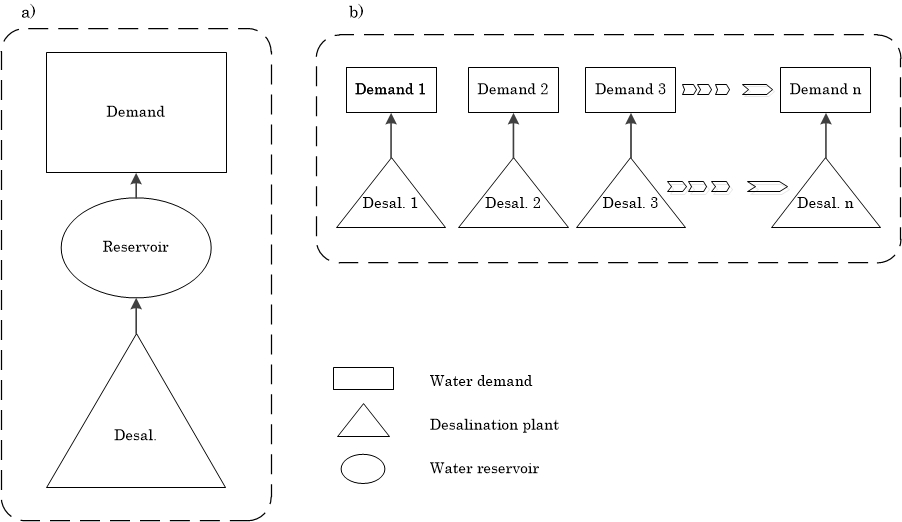
Diagram comparing centralised versus decentralised designs of water sectors

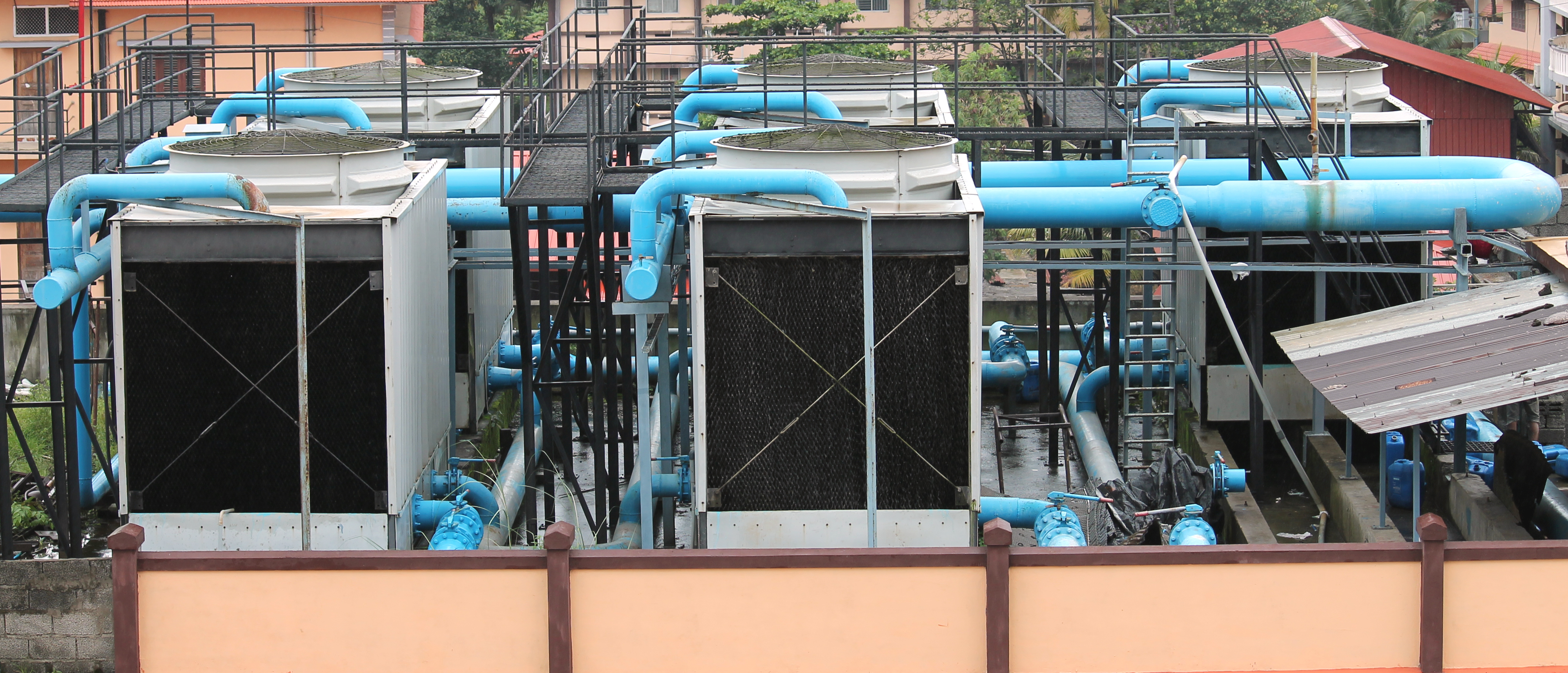
A centralised air conditioning unit

=== Relationship between centralisation (i.e. concentration of production) and capitalism ===
As written in V.I. Lenin's book, Imperialism, the Highest Stage of Capitalism, "The remarkably rapid concentration of production in ever-larger enterprises are one of the most characteristic features of capitalism." He researched the development of production and decided to develop the concept of production as a centralised framework, from individual and scattered small workshops into large factories, leading the capitalism to the world. This is guided by the idea that once concentration of production develops into a particular level, it will become a monopoly, like party organisations of Cartel, Syndicate, and Trust.

- Cartel - In economics, a cartel is an agreement between competing firms to control prices or exclude entry of a new competitor in a market. It is a formal organisation of sellers or buyers that agree to fix selling prices, purchase prices, or reduce production using a variety of tactics.
- Syndicate - A syndicate is a self-organising group made up of individuals, companies, corporations or entities formed to transact some specific business, to pursue or promote a shared interest.
- Trust - "A trust is ... simply the case of one person holding the title of property, whether land or chattels, for the benefit of another, termed a beneficiary. Nothing can be more common or more useful. But the word is now loosely applied to a certain class, of commercial agreements and, by reason of a popular and unreasoning dread of their effect, the term itself has become contaminated."

== Centralisation in business studies ==
An animation representing centralised information processing

Most businesses deal with issues relating to the specifics of centralisation or decentralisation of decision-making. The key question is either whether the authority should manage all the things at the centre of a business (centralised), or whether it should be delegated far away from the centre (decentralised).

The choice between centralised or decentralised varies. Many large businesses necessarily involve some extent of decentralisation and some extent of centralisation when it begins to operate from several places or any new units and markets added.

According to a 2021 study, "firms that delegated more power from the central headquarters to local plant managers prior to the Great Recession outperformed their centralised counterparts in sectors that were hardest hit by the subsequent crisis."

=== Features of centralisation in management ===
1. Top-level managers concentrate and reserve the decision-making power.
2. Execution decided by the top-level management with the help from the other levels of management.
3. Lower levels management do their jobs under direct control of the top managers.

== See also ==
- Centralization (phonetics)
- Decentralization
- Political unitarism
- Nation-state
- Nueva Planta decrees – a series of centralizing royal decrees issued in Spain in the early 18th century
- Rule of avoidance
