= Attached county =

- Traditional Chinese: 附郭縣
- Simplified Chinese: 附郭县
- Literal meaning: county attached to a city wall
Transcriptions
Standard Mandarin
- Hanyu Pinyin: fùguōxiàn
- Wade–Giles: fu-kuo-hsien fu-kou hsien

Alternative Chinese name
- Traditional Chinese: 倚郭縣
- Simplified Chinese: 倚郭县
- Literal meaning: county leaning against a city wall
Transcriptions
Standard Mandarin
- Hanyu Pinyin: yǐguōxiàn
- Wade–Giles: i-kuo-hsien i-kuo hsien

An attached county or satellite county, sometimes left untranslated in its Chinese name as a fuguoxian, was a kind of historical tertiary administrative division in late Imperial China. It was a xian (generally translated for this period as "county" in English) based within the capital of a fu (generally translated for this period as "prefecture").

As such, many of the county magistrate's usual duties and powers were subordinated to the prefectural administration and he was subject to much closer supervision than usual. Although an attached county was given first rank among the divisions of a prefecture and known as the "head county", the position was avoided by most scholar-bureaucrats. A Qing proverb held that, "If you had done something bad in your previous incarnation, you would be an average magistrate now; if you had done something worse, you would be a magistrate of a prefectural attached county; but if you had done something worst, you would be a magistrate of a provincial attached county" ("前生不善，今生知縣；前生作惡，知縣附郭；惡貫滿盈，附郭省城").

== History ==
Since the Yuan dynasty, some zhou (smaller prefectures) began to be compact to dissolve their attached counties, thus they had direct authority over their walled cities along with environs (namely, zhou proper), rather than via any county. Since the Ming dynasty, all the attached counties of zhou (subprefectures) were eliminated.

Under the Ming and Qing, it was standard for every prefecture to have an attached county with a limited role within and around the prefectural capital.

There were, generally, multiple attached counties in larger prefectures: three and four in one instance, respectively (Suzhou in Qing, since 1724: Wu, Changzhou and Yuanhe; Jingzhao in Tang, since the late 660s: Chang'an, Wannian, Qianfeng, and Mingtang), two in all others. In such cases, their boundary ran through the walled city, and their owned yamen were sited in the appropriate sectors.

Some attached counties are reserved so far. However, with urbanization, many of them have been merged, similar to the consolidated city-county in the US.
