= The Execution of Mayor Yin =

1978 collection of short stories by Chen Ruoxi on the Cultural Revolution

- Cover of Early Chinese Edition
- Authors: Nancy Ing; Howard Goldblatt
- Language: Chinese, English
- Genre: Scar literature
- Set in: Cultural Revolution era China (1966 - 1976)
- Publisher: Indiana University Press
- Publication date: June 1, 2004
- ISBN: 978-0253216908

The Execution of Mayor Yin (Chinese: 尹縣長; pinyin: Yǐn xiànzhǎng) is a 1978 collection of short stories by Chen Ruoxi, based on her experiences in mainland China during the 1960s and 1970s before she came to Taiwan.

The collection was published in English under the title The Execution of Mayor Yin and Other Stories from the Great Proletarian Cultural Revolution. Bloomington: Indiana University Press, 1978. Tr. by Nancy Ing and Howard Goldblatt. The English language translation attained wide recognition, as its publication occurred at a time when U.S. President Richard Nixon's historic visit to China, the death of Mao Zedong, and the thaw in diplomatic relations between the U.S. and China all generated widespread interest in China in the United States. A revised edition of the book with a new introduction by Perry Link was re-issued by Indiana University Press in 2004.

== Context ==
The Execution of Mayor Yin contains stories set during the period of the Cultural Revolution in China, approximately 1965–1975.

== Themes ==
Major themes of the stories in the collection include freedom vs. conformity, disillusionment, bewilderment, trauma, disgust, and political persecution.

== Motifs ==
Major motifs include the steady stream of political campaigns and the Cult of Mao, as well as many quintessential features of life in China and of Chinese culture.

A leitmotif running through the stories is the United States. Chen Ruoxi lived in the United States for a period, and many of the characters in her stories remark on contrasts between their experiences in the United States and in China, as well as between their expectations of life in the "new" China and what they observe of the "real" China.

== Short Stories Synopses ==
The Execution of Mayor Yin consists of eight stories:

- The Execution of Mayor Yin (first published in 1974)
- "Chairman Mao is a Rotten Egg"
- Night Duty
- Residency Check
- Jen Hsiu-lan
- The Big Fish
- Keng Erh in Peking
- Nixon's Press Corps

Brief synopses follow.

=== The Execution of Mayor Yin ===
During a visit to a rural area outside of Xi'an, the narrator sees how political violence during the Cultural Revolution finds escalates through a series of victims, culminating in "Mayor Yin" -- "Yin Xianzhang" or more literally "county magistrate" Yin.

Some of the characters in the story conclude that there is simply no way to understand all of the political campaigns, or to see their consequences in any logical framework.

The alludes to one of Mao Tse-tung's most famous speeches: Serve the People. The speech is about finding meaning in life by sacrifice.

=== "Chairman Mao is a Rotten Egg" ===
In this story, adults discover the absurd ends that a child's indiscretion can lead in the context of the Cult of Mao.

=== "Night Duty" ===
An idealistic teacher from Taiwan, who has also lived in the United States, now lives and works in China. In the course of service on a rural farm associated with his school in Nanjing—a variant on the Down to the Countryside Movement—he makes some discouraging observations. These include a former book lover who has given up on books, and members of the "red" (proletariat) class who steal from the community.

=== "Residency Check" ===
This story turns on accusations of infidelity made against the narrator's (female) neighbor.

=== "Jen Hsiu-lan" ===
A (woman) political prisoner makes an "escape."

The story is highly symbolic, with pastoral scenes of children combing a hillside in search of the escaped prisoner. The "escapee" turns out to have drowned herself in a cesspool.

Mao Tse-tung's speech, Serve the People, is alluded to again in this story.

A theme of the story is women's liberation (or lack of it) in the "new" China.

=== "The Big Fish" ===
A man enjoys the sensual thrill of hunting down, negotiating for, and purchasing a small luxury - a large fish of a kind seldom available—from his local market. His joy is short-lived when he is told that the fish must be returned, in order to preserve the appearance of abundance for visiting reporters.

=== "Keng Erh in Peking" ===
This story describes the life of a Chinese man who, after living in the United States for twenty years, moves to China.

The story takes place in Peking. It tells about two relationships that the protagonist has had with women, and how both relationships were thwarted by class struggle campaigns taking place throughout China at that time.

=== "Nixon's Press Corps" ===
U.S. President Richard Nixon's historic visit to China forms the backdrop of this story. The story describes how in one particular neighborhood in the southern Chinese city of Nanjing, all residents are encouraged/required to take down their drying racks in order to make a favorable impression on visiting foreigners. In the story, the narrator resists pressure from the leaders of her community, and reflects on the extremes of control in the society.

== Bibliography ==
- Bibliography for individual story translations (found at http://mclc.osu.edu/rc/bib.htm):
- "Chairman Mao is a Rotten Egg." In Ann C. Carver and Sung-sheng Yvonne Chang, eds., Bamboo Shoots After the Rain: Contemporary Stories by Women Writers of Taiwan. NY: The Feminist Press, 1990, 83–102.
- "The Fish." Tr. Nancy Ing. The Chinese Pen (Winter 1977): 1–15.
- "Jen Hsiu-lan." Trs. Nancy Ing and H. Goldblatt. The Chinese Pen (Summer 1977).
- "Mayor Ying." Tr. Jeanne Kelly. In Wai-lim Yip, ed., Chinese Arts and Literature: A Survey of Recent Trends. Occasional Papers/Reprint Series in Contemporary Asian Studies. Baltimore, 1977, 17–40.
- "Night Watch." Tr. Nancy Chang Ing. In Wai-lim Yip, ed., Chinese Arts and Literature: A Survey of Recent Trends. Occasional Papers/Reprint Series in Contemporary Asian Studies. Baltimore, 1977, 41–57.
- "Residency Check." Tr. Howard Goldblatt. The Chinese Pen (Autumn, 1977): 1-27.
