= See Without Looking =

- official poster
- Chinese: 推拿
- Literal meaning: Tui na
- Hanyu Pinyin: Tuīná
- Based on: Massage by Bi Feiyu
- Written by: Chen Cheng
- Directed by: Kang Honglei
- Starring: Pu Cunxin; Zhang Guoqiang; Li Jingjing; Liu Weiwei; Gao Yalin
- Country of origin: China
- Original language: Mandarin
- No. of episodes: 30

Production
- Production companies: Zhejiang Huace Film & TV Co.

Original release
- Network: China Central Television
- Release: August 15 – September 4, 2013

See Without Looking is a 2013 fictional Chinese language TV serial broadcast by CCTV-1 in 2013 with collections sold on DVD that incorporates blind masseurs (a common occupation for blind people in China) in the plot. 30 episodes were broadcast, each around 40 to 45 minutes in length.
