= Shi Shuqing =

Shi Shuqing (Chinese: 施叔青; Wade–Giles: Shih Shu-ch'ing; born 1945) is a Taiwan-Chinese writer and educator.

She was born in Lukang, Changhua and is the sister of writer Li Ang. Shi was educated at Tamkang University and City University of New York. She taught at Taipei's National Chengchi University. In 1978, Shi moved to Hong Kong where she became director of Asian programs at the Hong Kong Arts Centre, later working as a consultant there. She returned to Taiwan in 1997. She is a chair professor in the Department of Chinese as a Second Language at National Taiwan Normal University.

== Selected works ==
- The Barren Years and Other Short Stories and Plays, English translation (1975)
- Yi ye you : Xianggang de gu shi (One night journeys - Hong Kong stories, short stories (1985))
- Xianggang sanbuqu (Hong Kong trilogy) (1993, 1995, 1997)
- Weiduoliya julebu (The Victoria Club), novella (1993)
- Weixun caizhuang (Blush of intoxication), novel (1999)
- City of the Queen, novel translated by Howard Goldblatt (2008)
