= Massage (novel) =

2008 Chinese novel by Bi Feiyu

- Cover
- Author: Bi Feiyu
- Translator: Howard Goldblatt & Sylvia Li-chun Lin (2015)
- Language: Chinese
- Simplified Chinese: 推拿
- Literal meaning: Tui na
- Hanyu Pinyin: Tuīná

Massage is a 2008 Chinese novel by Bi Feiyu about blind masseurs. It won the 8th Mao Dun Literature Prize in 2011, one of China's most prestigious literary awards. The novel has been translated into English (by Howard Goldblatt and Sylvia Li-chun Lin), German (by Marc Hermann), Russian (by Natalia Vlasova), Korean (by Moon Hyun-seon), and Japanese (by Yutori Iizuka).

Massage was adapted into a 2013 TV series See Without Looking, a 2014 film Blind Massage (which won Asian Film Award for Best Film and Golden Horse Award for Best Feature Film), as well as a successful stage production.
