= Bi Feiyu =

Chinese writer

- 毕飞宇
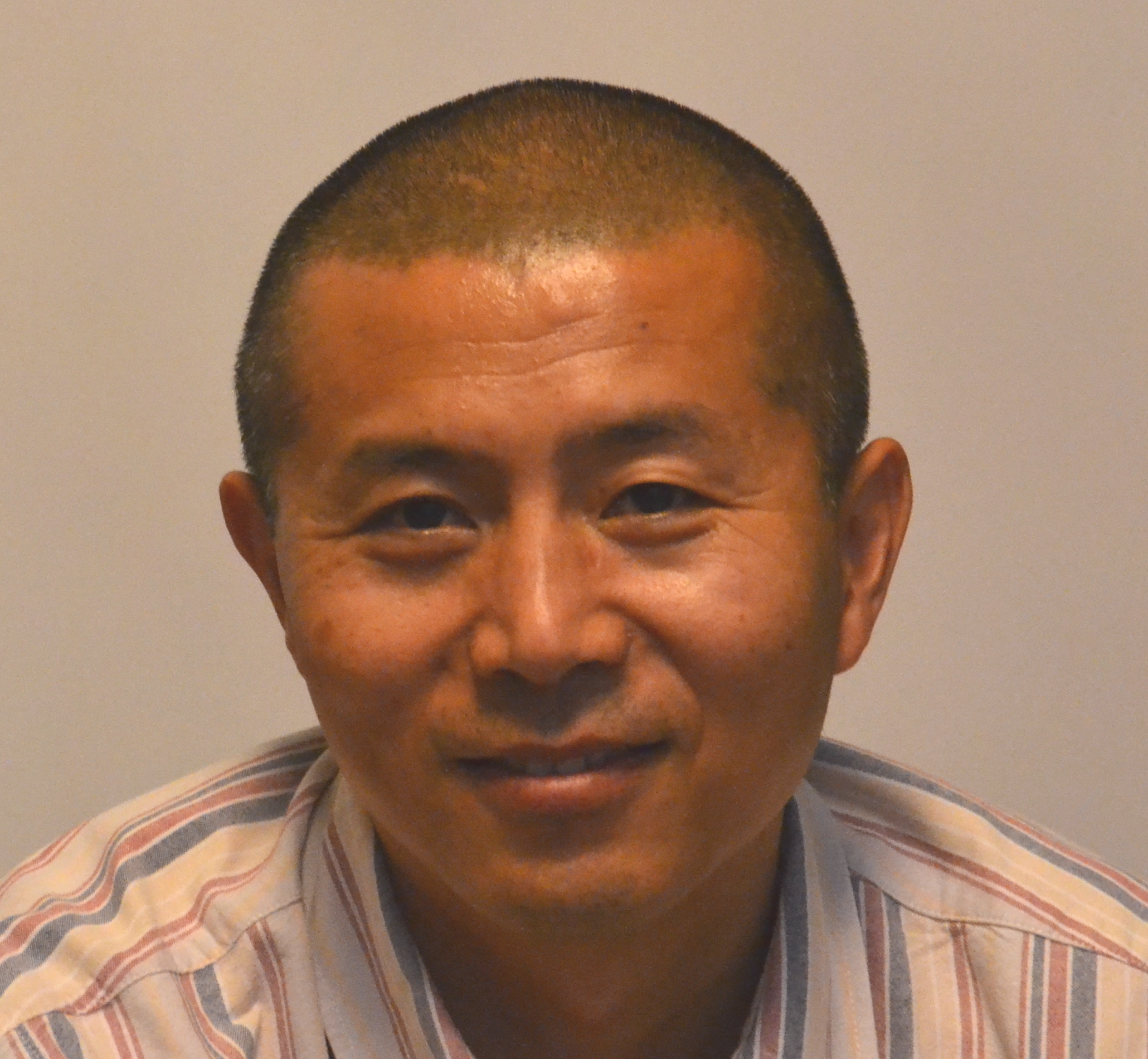
- Born: 1964 (age 61–62); Xinghua, Jiangsu, China
- Education: Yangzhou Normal College
- Occupation: Novelist
- Writing career
- Language: Chinese
- Period: 1987 - present
- Genre: novel
- Notable work: Three Sisters
- Notable awards: 3rd Lu Xun Literary Prize Man Asian Literary Prize; 2010 Three Sisters; 8th Mao Dun Literary Prize; 2011 Massage

Chinese name
- Traditional Chinese: 畢飛宇
- Simplified Chinese: 毕飞宇
Transcriptions
Standard Mandarin
- Hanyu Pinyin: Bì Fēiyǔ

Bi Feiyu (Chinese: 毕飞宇; pinyin: Bì Fēiyǔ, born 1964) is a Chinese writer. His works are known for their complex portrayal of the "female psyche." He has won some of the highest literary awards in China. He also wrote the screenplay for Zhang Yimou's 1996 film Shanghai Triad.

== Biography ==
Bi was born in Xinghua, Jiangsu Province in 1964. His name Feiyu means "one who flies across the universe". He lives in Nanjing.

== Critical reception ==
Feiyu's novel The Moon Opera (青衣), translated by Howard Goldblatt, was longlisted for the 2008 Independent Foreign Fiction Prize, while Three Sisters (玉米, 玉秀, 玉秧), also translated by Goldblatt, won the 2010 Man Asian Literary Prize. In China, his awards include twice winning the Lu Xun Literary Prize; and the 2011 Mao Dun Prize, the highest national literary award, for Massage.

== Selected works in translation ==
- Massage. Translated by Howard Goldblatt; Sylvia Li-chun Lin. Melbourne: Penguin. February 2015. ISBN 978-0-67-008097-7.
- Three Sisters. Translated by Howard Goldblatt; Sylvia Li-chun Lin. London: Telegram. June 2010. ISBN 9781846590238.
- The Moon Opera. Translated by Howard Goldblatt; Sylvia Li-chun Lin. London: Telegram. November 2007. ISBN 978-0-15-101294-7.

== Awards ==
In 2011, Bi Feiyu won the Mao Dun Literary Prize for his novel Massage, one of the most prestigious literature prizes in China.

On August 21, 2017, the French Ministry of Culture awarded the Ordre des Arts et des Lettres to Bi Feiyu at the General Consulate of France in Shanghai.
