= Rule of avoidance =

The rule of avoidance was a rule employed typically in states with centralized government system which prohibited local officials from serving in their places of origin, so that family and friends would not influence them and prevent local separatism.

The system was originated in Han dynasty of China and has persisted into modern times. A system similar to this was adopted by Emperor Akbar of the Mughal Empire to prevent corruption and favoritism. It is also an entirely different principle in United States constitutional law, and a cultural norm in some cultures that promotes exogamy.

== China ==
The rule of avoidance employed during the Han dynasty, and persisted through various subsequent dynasties and continues to influence the appointment of local government leaders in the People’s Republic of China and the Chinese Communist Party, prohibited local officials from serving in their places of origin, so that family and friends would not influence them and prevent the potential separatism movement. Terms of service were for only three or four years, and parents and sons over fifteen could not accompany officials. Each prefecture sent delegates to an annual court assembly. This practice would continue through to the end of the Qing dynasty.

== Mughal Empire ==
In the time of Emperor Akbar of the Mughal Empire (in the area of what is now India, Pakistan and Afghanistan), a system similar to this was put into place to ensure smooth running of government and to prevent corruption. Government officials were not allowed to serve in one jurisdiction for long so that they did not become too involved in local affairs and become stronger than the Emperor himself. After a period of time, employees of the Emperor were transferred and jurisdiction of service was thus rotated regularly. The implementation of this system in the Empire by Akbar helped in preventing corruption and favoritism. This method was discarded and forgotten by the later Emperors.

== United States law ==
The rule of avoidance employed by the United States Supreme Court is a principle called Ashwander rules, settled in Ashwander v. TVA (297 US 288, 346-347 (1936)), that where a controversy may be settled on a platform other than one involving constitutional adjudication, the court should avoid the constitutional question. It was articulated by Justice Louis D. Brandeis, are a set of principles used by the United States Supreme Court for avoiding constitutional rulings.

== Irish law ==
This principle is also used in Irish law: see Carmody v Minister for Justice.
