= Tuina maurella =

Scientific classification
- Domain: Eukaryota
- Kingdom: Animalia
- Phylum: Arthropoda
- Class: Insecta
- Order: Lepidoptera
- Superfamily: Noctuoidea
- Family: Erebidae
- Subfamily: Arctiinae
- Genus: Tuina
- Species: T. maurella

Binomial name
- Tuina maurella Draudt, 1919

Species of moth

Tuina maurella is a moth in the subfamily Arctiinae. It was described by Max Wilhelm Karl Draudt in 1919. It is found in Costa Rica.
