= European Convention on Human Rights Act 2003 =

Legislation in Ireland

The European Convention of Human Rights Act 2003 is an act of the Irish parliament, the Oireachtas, which gave further effect to the European Convention on Human Rights in Irish law. It is substantially similar to the UK's Human Rights Act 1998.

The Act did not incorporate the convention into Irish law, but rather requires the courts to interpret legislation in line with the convention insofar as it is possible to do so, and requires certain public bodies to perform their functions in a manner compatible with the convention, unless precluded by law. The Act also provides that courts may make a declaration of incompatibility regarding a breach of a convention right, but unlike a declaration that a law is repugnant to the constitution, a declaration of incompatibility has no effect on the continued validity and enforcement of that law.

== Main provisions ==
Section 2 of the Act requires that, subject to the existing rules of statutory interpretation, the Courts should apply both common law rules and statutory provisions so that they are compatible with the convention.

Section 3 requires that, subject to any other provisions of domestic law, 'organs of state' must perform their duties in a manner compatible with the convention. Anyone who suffers injury, loss or damage as a result such a body's failure to do this is entitled to damages. Section 1 defines an organ of state as a tribunal or any other body established or any body through which the powers of the State are exercised.

Section 5 of the Act grants to the courts the power to make a declaration that a statutory provision or common law rule is incompatible with the convention. Such a declaration does not render the law in question invalid, rather the Taoiseach is obliged to bring any such declaration to the attention of both Dáil and Seanad Éireann. A litigant who has been granted a declaration of incompatibility may receive monetary compensation in accordance with the principles of just satisfaction under Article 41 of the convention, but the award of such compensation is entirely within the discretion of the Government.

The Convention itself is set out in Schedules 1-4 of the Act.

== Important Case Law ==
=== Carmody v Minister for Justice ===
Carmody v Minister for Justice was decision of the High Court and the first major case to deal with the new legislation. Carmody was a farmer who had been charged with a number of offences under the Diseases of Animals Act 1966. He challenged the State's failure to provide him with free legal aid, claiming that it was contrary to both the Constitution of Ireland and the European Convention on Human Rights. In her judgment, Ms. Justice Laffoy applied the rule of avoidance and concluded that, in the absence of any express statement in the Act to the contrary, the court should rule on the Convention issue before examining its constitutionality. The plaintiff lost on both counts. This decision has been negatively received by some commentators.
