= Tuina (moth) =

Scientific classification
- Domain: Eukaryota
- Kingdom: Animalia
- Phylum: Arthropoda
- Class: Insecta
- Order: Lepidoptera
- Superfamily: Noctuoidea
- Family: Erebidae
- Subfamily: Arctiinae
- Tribe: Lithosiini
- Genus: Tuina; Butler, 1877

Synonyms
- Ituna Walker, 1854 (preocc. Doubleday)

Genus of moths

Tuina is a genus of moths in the subfamily Arctiinae.

== Species ==
- Tuina cingulata Walker, 1854
- Tuina maurella Draudt, 1919
