= Heaven is high and the emperor is far away =

Proverb

- Traditional Chinese: 天高皇帝遠
- Simplified Chinese: 天高皇帝远
Transcriptions
Standard Mandarin
- Hanyu Pinyin: Tiān gāo, huángdì yuǎn
Yue: Cantonese
- Yale Romanization: Tīn gōu wòhng dai yúhn
- Jyutping: Tin1 gou1 wong4 dai3 jyun5

Mountains are high and the emperor is far away
- Traditional Chinese: 山高皇帝遠
- Simplified Chinese: 山高皇帝远
Transcriptions
Standard Mandarin
- Hanyu Pinyin: Shān gāo, huángdì yuǎn
Yue: Cantonese
- Yale Romanization: Sāan gōu wòhng dai yúhn
- Jyutping: Saan1 gou1 wong4 dai3 jyun5

Heaven is high and the emperor is far away is a Chinese proverb thought to have originated from Zhejiang during the Yuan dynasty. Both historically and in contemporary China, the proverb has a variety of uses, for example: (1) in reference to local government autonomy, (2) in reference to corruption of local officials or lawlessness, or (3) in reference to minor offenses committed outside the oversight of authorities.

== Usage ==
In one traditional usage, it described unscrupulous or predatory behavior of local authorities, who being far away from the imperial court, were hard to control or who could evade being caught.

Throughout Chinese history, imperial officials in the capital generally exercised little direct oversight on the affairs of lower-level governments, allowing for a significant level of regional autonomy. Contemporary usage could refer to something minor—such as walking on the grass when no one is watching, or a child ignoring a parent's command because the parent is not immediately supervising them—or something more major, such as poaching or illegal natural resource extraction. It can also still be used to describe a lawless place far from the authorities and in reference to corruption.

The original variation, "the mountains are high, and the emperor is far away", is also still heard (山高皇帝远).

== Russian similarity ==
In Russian, there exists a directly similar proverb: до бога высоко, до царя далеко do boga vysoko, do czarya daleko, with a usually omitted rhyming continuation of а до меня близко - кланяйся мне низко a do menya blizko - klanyaysa mne nizko, which can be translated as "God is high, and the czar is far away (while I am near, so bow deeply to me)". In its short form, it is typically used to say there is no hope for external aid; while the full form describes lower echelons of bureaucracy abusing their immediate power while the authority meant to keep them in check is distant or otherwise unable to intervene.

Also, Бог высок и царь очень далёк (Bog vysok i tsar' dalyok, "God is on high and the tsar is very far away").

Another proverb with a similar meaning is жалует царь, да не жалует псарь zhaluyet czar da ne zhaluyet psar - "One has the czar's favor, but doesn't have the kennelmaster's favor" - likewise meaning that the distant higher echelons of power have less weight than the lower ones with whom the person in question has to deal personally.

== See also ==
- Chinese proverbs in Wikiquote
