= Tuina cingulata =

Scientific classification
- Kingdom: Animalia
- Phylum: Arthropoda
- Class: Insecta
- Order: Lepidoptera
- Superfamily: Noctuoidea
- Family: Erebidae
- Subfamily: Arctiinae
- Genus: Tuina
- Species: T. cingulata

Binomial name
- Tuina cingulata (Walker, 1854)

Synonyms
- Ituna cingulata Walker, 1854

Species of moth

Tuina cingulata is a moth in the subfamily Arctiinae. It was described by Francis Walker in 1854. It is found in Mexico, Honduras and Guatemala.
