= Li Ang (writer) =

Taiwanese feminist writer

Shih Shu-tuan 施淑端
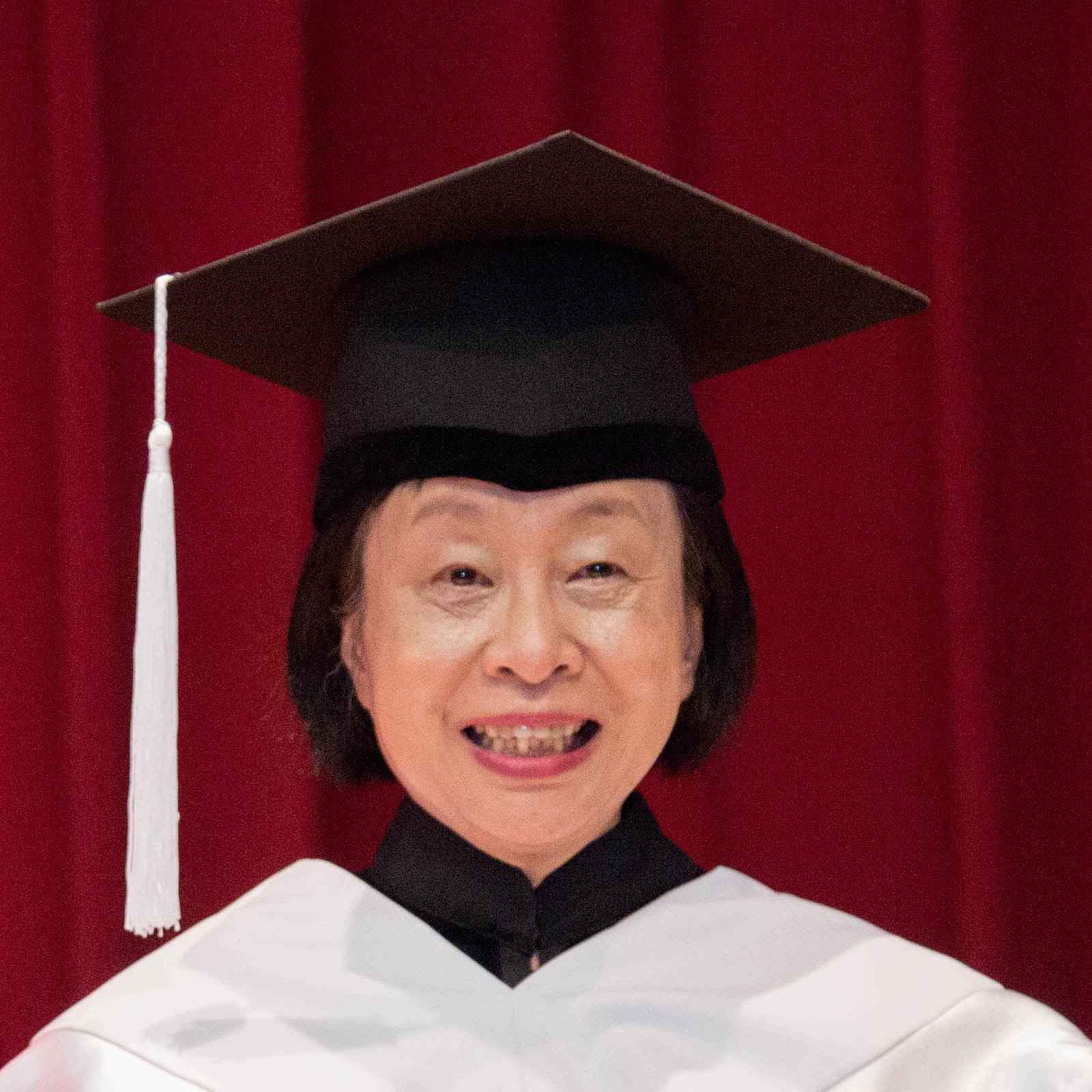
- Born: Shih Shu-tuan (施淑端; Pinyin: Shī Shūduān); 5 April 1952 (age 74); Lukang, Changhua, Taiwan
- Education: Chinese Culture University (BA); University of Oregon (MA)
- Occupation: Writer
- Writing career
- Pen name: Li Ang（李昂; Pinyin: Lǐ Áng）
- Language: Chinese
- Period: 1969– present
- Genre: Fiction
- Notable works: The Butcher's Wife; Mysterious Garden
- Notable awards: "Chevalier de l'Ordre des Arts et des Lettres" by French Minister of Culture and Communication

Shih Shu-tuan (Chinese: 施淑端; born 5 April 1952), pen name Li Ang (Chinese: 李昂), is a Taiwanese feminist writer. After graduating from Chinese Culture University with a degree in philosophy, she studied drama at the University of Oregon, after which she returned to teach at her alma mater. Her major work is The Butcher's Wife (殺夫: 1983, tr. 1986), though she has written many other novels. Feminist themes and sexuality are present in much of her work. Many of her stories are set in Lukang.

== Career ==
The Butcher's Wife is critical of traditional Chinese patriarchy. The heroine is sold by her dead father's brother into marriage with a brutal butcher much older than she. He dominates her sexually and takes pleasure in frightening her in various ways, including a visit to the slaughterhouse, after which the heroine in a disoriented state of mind murders him with a butcher's blade.

Li Ang is known for her idiosyncratic, candid and penetrating insights on gender politics in the social life in contemporary Taiwan. Beginning her writing career at the age of 16, she has published nearly twenty novels and collections of short stories centering on women in such topics as pubescent female psychosexuality, feminism and gender, sex and female subjectivity. Her bold and successive broaching of subjects bordering on the taboo within the cultural context of Taiwan has earned her extensive critical acclaim both in the world of Chinese letters and internationally. Translated into different languages and published worldwide, many of her works have been reviewed by leading newspapers in many countries, including The New York Times, and made into films and T.V. series. In 2004, Li Ang was awarded the "Chevalier de l'Ordre des Arts et des Lettres" by the French Minister of Culture and Communication in recognition of her outstanding contribution to world literature.

== Works ==
This is a complete list of Li Ang's works published in Taiwan as well as the English translations of her work.

=== Novels ===
- 1977 《人間世》The Secular World (Taipei: Dahan Publisher)
- 1982 《愛情試驗》Test of Love (Taipei: Hongfan Bookstore)
- 1983 《殺夫：鹿城故事》The Butcher's Wife (Taipei: Linking Books)
- 1984 《她們的眼淚》Their Tears (Taipei: Hongfan Bookstore)
- 1985 《花季》Flower Season (Taipei: Hongfan Bookstore)
- 1985 《暗夜》Dark Night (Taipei: China Times Publisher)
- 1986 《一封未寄的情書》A Love Letter Never Sent (Taipei: Hongfan Bookstore)
- 1988 《年華》The Best Years (Taipei: Hongfan Bookstore)
- 1991 《迷園》Mysterious Garden (Taipei: Maotun famai Co.)
- 1991 《甜美生活》Sweet Life (Taipei: Hongfan Bookstore)
- 1992 《李昂集》Selected Works by Li Ang (Taipei: Avanguard)
- 1997 《北港香爐人人插：戴貞操帶的魔鬼系列》Beigang Incense Burner of Lust: The Devil with a Chastity Belt Series (Taipei: Rye Field Publishing Co)
- 1999 《禁色的暗夜：李昂情色小說集》The Dark Night of Forbidden Desire (Taipei: Crown Publisher)
- 2000 《自傳の小說》Autobiography: A Novel (Taipei: Crown Publisher)
- 2004 《看得見的鬼》Visible Ghosts (Taipei: Unitas Publisher)
- 2005 《花間迷情》Bewitching Love (Taipei: Locus Publishing)
- 2007 《鴛鴦春膳》An Erotic Feast for Lovebirds (Taipei: Unitas Publisher)
- 2009 《七世姻緣之台灣／中國情人》Marriage in Seven Lives: Entangled Love Affairs of Taiwanese Mainlander (Taiepei: Linking Books)
- 2011 《附身》Possession (Taipei: Chiuko)
- 2014 《路邊甘蔗眾人啃》Everyone Takes a Bite out of Roadside Sugarcanes (Taipei: Chiuko)

=== Prose ===
- 1987 《貓咪與情人》A Stray Cat and a Lover (Taipei: China Times Publisher)
- 2000 《漂流之旅》Drifting Voyageur (Taipei: Crown Publisher)
- 2002 《愛吃鬼》Gourmand (Taipei: Yifan)
- 2009 《愛吃鬼的華麗冒險》The Splendid Adventure of a Gourmand (Taipei: Route Culture Co.)
- 2013 《愛吃鬼的祕徑：李昂帶路的美食奇妙之旅》A Gourmand's Secret Footpath (Taipei: Route Culture Co.)
- 2014 《李昂的獨嘉美食》Li Ang's Exclusive Chiayi Cuisines (Chiayi: Cultural Bureau of Chiayi City)

=== Other works ===
- 1976 《群像─中國當代藝術家訪問》Group of Characters (Taipei: Dahan Publisher)(interview collection)
- 1984 《女性的意見》Women's Opinions (Taipei: China Times Publisher)(newspaper column collection)
- 1985 《外遇》Extra-Marital Affairs (Taipei: China Times Publisher)(Fieldwork report)
- 1986 《走出暗夜》Walking Out of the Dark Night (Taipei: Avanguard)(newspaper column collection)
- 1989 《水鬼城煌》City God: The Water Spirit (Taipei: Yuan-liu Publishing Co)(children's literature)
- 1993 《懶人變猴子：賽夏族的故事》Lazy People Turn into Monkeys: Saisiat Folklore (Taipei: Yuan-liu Publishing Co.)(children's literature)
- 1993 《施明德前傳》An Early Chapter of Shi Mingde's Life (Taipei: Avanguard)(biography)
- 1994 《李昂說情》Li Ang Talks about Love (Taipei: Maotun famai Co.)(newspaper column collection)

=== English translations ===
- Ang, Li (1986). The Butcher's Wife. trans. Howard Goldblatt and Ellen Yeung. San Francisco: North Point Press.
- Ang, Li (1990). "Flower Season," Bamboo Shoots after the Rain. trans. Ann C. Carver and S. Y. Chang.
- Ang, Li (1990). The Butcher's Wife. trans. Howard Goldblatt and Ellen Yeung. Hong Kong: Joint Publishing Co.
- Ang, Li (1991). "A Love Letter Never Sent" Worlds of Modern Chinese Fiction. trans. Howard Goldblatt. Armok: N. Y. Sharpe.
- Ang, Li (1995). The Butcher's Wife and Other Stories. trans. Howard Goldblatt. Boston: Cheng and Tsui Company.
- Ang, Li (2015). The Lost Garden. trans. Sylvia Li-chun Lin and Howard Goldblatt. New York: Columbia University Press.
