= Chen Ruoxi =

Taiwanese author (born 1938)

- 陳若曦
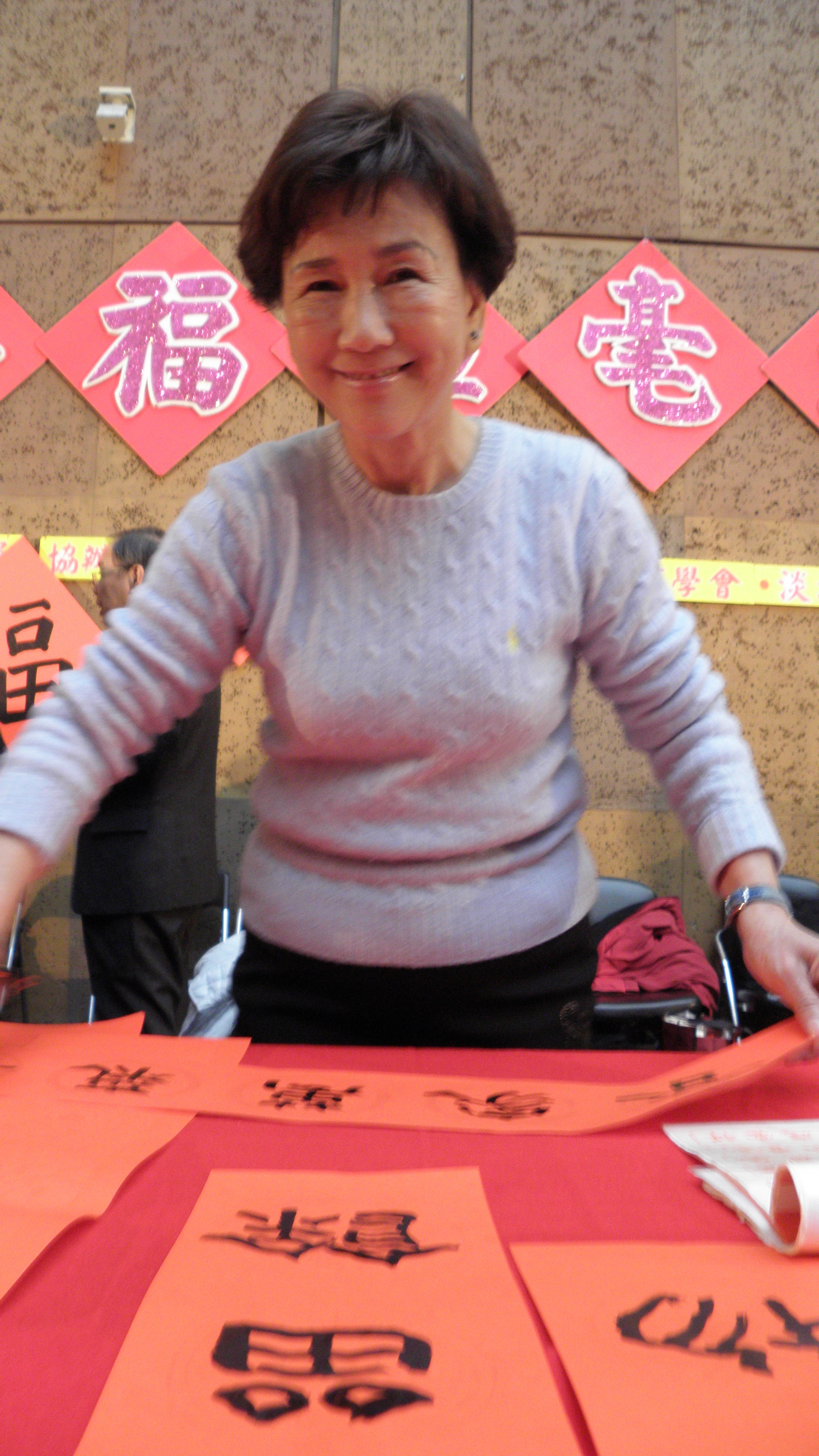
- Born: 15 November 1938 (age 87); Yonghe, Taihoku Prefecture, (Japan) Japanese Taiwan
- Education: National Taiwan University (BA)
- Occupation: Writer

Chen Ruoxi (Chinese: 陳若曦; pinyin: Chén Ruòxī; Pe̍h-ōe-jī: Tân Jio̍k-hi; also published in English under Romanised name Chen Jo-hsi; born 15 November 1938) is a Taiwanese author. A graduate of National Taiwan University, she among others helped found the literary journal Xiandai wenxue (Modern Literature).

== Works translated into English ==
=== Mayor Yin ===
Chen Ruoxi's most famous work (particularly among English-speaking audiences) is her short story collection, The Execution of Mayor Yin, which was published in English translation in 1978.

In addition to The Execution of Mayor Yin collection and the translations of individual stories from that collection, there have been English translations of several of Chen Ruoxi's other story collections, as well as of individual stories.

=== Other Collections ===
The Old Man and Other Stories. Hong Kong: Chinese University of HK, 1986.

The Short Stories of Ruoxi Chen, Translated from the Original Chinese: A Writer at the Crossroads. Tr. Hsin-sheng C. Kao. Lewiston, NY: Edwin Mellen, 1992.

Spirit Calling: Five Stories of Taiwan. Tr. Lucy H.M. Chen. Taipei: Heritage Press, 1962.

=== Other individual stories ===
"Another Fortress Besieged." Tr. Loh I-cheng. The Chinese Pen (Winter, 1980): 62-99. Rpt. in Nancy Ing, ed., Winter Plum: Contemporary Chinese Fiction. Taipei: Chinese Materials Center, 1982, 47-77. Also in Chen Ruoxi, The Old Man dn Other Stories, 81-112. .

"'I Love Chairman Mao'." Excerpts from the novel The Repatriates. Tr. Howard Goldblatt. In George Kao, ed., Two Writers and The Cultural Revolution. HK: Chinese University Press, 1980, 159-70.

"In and Outside the Wall." In Hsin-Sheng C. Kao, ed., Nativism Overseas: Contemporary Chinese Women Writers. Albany: SUNY, 1993, 25-51.

"The Last Performance." Tr. Timothy Ross and Joseph Lau. In Joseph S.M. Lau, ed., Chinese Stories From Taiwan: 1960-1970. NY: Columbia UP, 1976, 3-12.

"A Morning for Chao-ti." Tr. Lucy Chen. In Lucy Chen, Spirit Calling: Five Stories of Taiwan. Taipei: Heritage Press, 1962, 3-10. Also in Nieh Hua-ling, ed. and trans., Eight Stories By Chinese Women. Taipei: Heritage Press, 1962, 43-52.

"My Friend Ai Fen." Tr. Richard Kent and Vivian Hsu. In Vivian Ling Hsu, ed., Born of the Same Roots. Bloomington: IUP, 1981, 276-302. Republished in Chen Ruoxi, The Old Man and Other Stories, 81-112.

"On the Miseries of Writers in American Exile: Sanitized Versions for Taiwan, Hong Kong and the People's Republic." Tr. Kim Besio. In Helmut Martin, ed., Modern Chinese Writers: Self-portrayals. Armonk, NY: M.E. Sharpe, 1992, 187-92.

"Reunion in Nanking." Excerpts from the novel The Repatriates. Tr. Howard Goldblatt. In George Kao, ed., Two Writers and The Cultural Revolution. HK: Chinese University Press, 1980, 159-70.

"Ting Yun." Tr. Wang Chi-chen. Renditions 10 (1978): 93-100. Also in George Kao, ed., Two Writers and the Cultural Revolution. HK: Chinese University Press, 1980, 133-40 and in Chen Ruoxi, The Old Man and Other Stories, 63-80.

"The Tunnel." Tr. Wang Chi-chen. Renditions 10 (1978): 101-109. Rpt. in George Kao, ed., Two Writers and the Cultural Revolution. HK: Chinese University Press, 1980, 141-49. And in Chen Ruoxi, The Old Man and Other Stories. HK: Renditions, 1986.
