= Dream of the Red Chamber Award =

- Country: Hong Kong
- Presented by: Hong Kong Baptist University
- Reward: HK$300,000
- First award: 2006
- Website: http://redchamber.hkbu.edu.hk/

The Dream of the Red Chamber Award: The World's Distinguished Novel in Chinese (紅樓夢獎：世界華文長篇小說獎) is a biennial novel prize presented by Hong Kong Baptist University recognizing Chinese language fiction published both within China, and also internationally. Although the prize is named after the famous Qing novel Dream of the Red Chamber, works do not need to have any relationship to that novel.

== Winners and nominees ==
Year	Judging panel	Result	Author	Work
1st 2006
1st 2006	Chen Sihe; Hualing Nieh Engle; Huang Ziping; Joseph Lau Shiu-ming; William Tay; David Der-wei Wang			
1st 2006	Chen Sihe; Hualing Nieh Engle; Huang Ziping; Joseph Lau Shiu-ming; William Tay; David Der-wei Wang	Winner	Jia Pingwa	The Shaanxi Opera (秦腔)
1st 2006	Chen Sihe; Hualing Nieh Engle; Huang Ziping; Joseph Lau Shiu-ming; William Tay; David Der-wei Wang	Jury Awards	Dung Kai-cheung	The History of the Adventures of Vivi and Vera (天工开物‧栩栩如真)
1st 2006	Chen Sihe; Hualing Nieh Engle; Huang Ziping; Joseph Lau Shiu-ming; William Tay; David Der-wei Wang	Jury Awards	Jade Y. Chen	Sea God's Clan (海神家族)
1st 2006	Chen Sihe; Hualing Nieh Engle; Huang Ziping; Joseph Lau Shiu-ming; William Tay; David Der-wei Wang	Jury Awards	Liu Xinglong	Gate of Heaven (圣天门口)
1st 2006	Chen Sihe; Hualing Nieh Engle; Huang Ziping; Joseph Lau Shiu-ming; William Tay; David Der-wei Wang	Highly Recommended	Fan Wen	Breeding Land (水乳大地)
1st 2006	Chen Sihe; Hualing Nieh Engle; Huang Ziping; Joseph Lau Shiu-ming; William Tay; David Der-wei Wang	Highly Recommended	Ning Ken	Gate of Silence (沉默之门)
1st 2006	Chen Sihe; Hualing Nieh Engle; Huang Ziping; Joseph Lau Shiu-ming; William Tay; David Der-wei Wang	Highly Recommended	Yang Zhijun	Mastiffs of the Plateau (藏獒)
2nd 2008
2nd 2008	Chen Sihe; Hualing Nieh Engle; Huang Ziping; Ssu-ma Chung-yuan; David Der-wei Wang; Jia Pingwa			
2nd 2008	Chen Sihe; Hualing Nieh Engle; Huang Ziping; Ssu-ma Chung-yuan; David Der-wei Wang; Jia Pingwa	Winner	Mo Yan	Life and Death Are Wearing Me Out (生死疲劳)
2nd 2008	Chen Sihe; Hualing Nieh Engle; Huang Ziping; Ssu-ma Chung-yuan; David Der-wei Wang; Jia Pingwa	Jury Awards	Chu T’ien-wen	The Revelation of the Words of a Witch (巫言)
2nd 2008	Chen Sihe; Hualing Nieh Engle; Huang Ziping; Ssu-ma Chung-yuan; David Der-wei Wang; Jia Pingwa	Jury Awards	Dung Kai-cheung	Histories of Time (时间繁史‧哑瓷之光)
2nd 2008	Chen Sihe; Hualing Nieh Engle; Huang Ziping; Ssu-ma Chung-yuan; David Der-wei Wang; Jia Pingwa	Jury Awards	Wang Anyi	The Age of Enlightenment (启蒙时代)
2nd 2008	Chen Sihe; Hualing Nieh Engle; Huang Ziping; Ssu-ma Chung-yuan; David Der-wei Wang; Jia Pingwa	Highly Recommended	Zhang Wei	Songs from the Forest (刺猬歌)
2nd 2008	Chen Sihe; Hualing Nieh Engle; Huang Ziping; Ssu-ma Chung-yuan; David Der-wei Wang; Jia Pingwa	Highly Recommended	Cao Naiqian	There's Nothing I Can Do When I Think of You Late at Night (到黑夜想你没办法)
2nd 2008	Chen Sihe; Hualing Nieh Engle; Huang Ziping; Ssu-ma Chung-yuan; David Der-wei Wang; Jia Pingwa	Highly Recommended	Tie Ning	Stupid Flower (笨花)
3rd 2010
3rd 2010	Chen I-chih; Chen Sihe; Chou Ying-hsiung; Huang Ziping; David Der-wei Wang; Mo Yan			
3rd 2010	Chen I-chih; Chen Sihe; Chou Ying-hsiung; Huang Ziping; David Der-wei Wang; Mo Yan	Winner	Luo Yijun	Tangut Inn (西夏旅館)
3rd 2010	Chen I-chih; Chen Sihe; Chou Ying-hsiung; Huang Ziping; David Der-wei Wang; Mo Yan	Jury Awards	Li Yung-ping	Sailing Up the Big River (大河尽头)
3rd 2010	Chen I-chih; Chen Sihe; Chou Ying-hsiung; Huang Ziping; David Der-wei Wang; Mo Yan	Jury Awards	Diao Dou	Chronicle of My Brother Diao Bei (我哥刁北年表)
3rd 2010	Chen I-chih; Chen Sihe; Chou Ying-hsiung; Huang Ziping; David Der-wei Wang; Mo Yan	Jury Awards	Bi Feiyu	Massage (推拿)
3rd 2010	Chen I-chih; Chen Sihe; Chou Ying-hsiung; Huang Ziping; David Der-wei Wang; Mo Yan	Highly Recommended	Hon Lai-chu	Grey Blossom (灰花)
3rd 2010	Chen I-chih; Chen Sihe; Chou Ying-hsiung; Huang Ziping; David Der-wei Wang; Mo Yan	Highly Recommended	Zhang Ling	Gold Mountain Blues (金山)
4th 2012
4th 2012	Michael Berry; Chen I-chih; Chen Sihe; Chung Ling; Huang Ziping; Luo Yijun			
4th 2012	Michael Berry; Chen I-chih; Chen Sihe; Chung Ling; Huang Ziping; Luo Yijun	Winner	Wang Anyi	Scent of Heaven (天香)
4th 2012	Michael Berry; Chen I-chih; Chen Sihe; Chung Ling; Huang Ziping; Luo Yijun	Jury Awards	Jia Pingwa	Old Kiln (古炉)
4th 2012	Michael Berry; Chen I-chih; Chen Sihe; Chung Ling; Huang Ziping; Luo Yijun	Jury Awards	Yan Lianke	The Four Books (四书)
4th 2012	Michael Berry; Chen I-chih; Chen Sihe; Chung Ling; Huang Ziping; Luo Yijun	Jury Awards	Ge Fei	The Last Spring in Jiangnan (春尽江南)
4th 2012	Michael Berry; Chen I-chih; Chen Sihe; Chung Ling; Huang Ziping; Luo Yijun	Highly Recommended	Li Zishu	The Age of Goodbyes (告別的年代)
4th 2012	Michael Berry; Chen I-chih; Chen Sihe; Chung Ling; Huang Ziping; Luo Yijun	Highly Recommended	Geling Yan	Criminal Lu Yanshi (陆犯焉识)
5th 2014
5th 2014	Michael Berry; Chen I-chih; Chen Sihe; Chung Ling; Huang Ziping; Wang Anyi			
5th 2014	Michael Berry; Chen I-chih; Chen Sihe; Chung Ling; Huang Ziping; Wang Anyi	Winner	Wong Bik-Wan	Children of Darkness (烈佬传)
5th 2014	Michael Berry; Chen I-chih; Chen Sihe; Chung Ling; Huang Ziping; Wang Anyi	Jury Awards	Yan Lianke	The Explosion Chronicles (炸裂志)
5th 2014	Michael Berry; Chen I-chih; Chen Sihe; Chung Ling; Huang Ziping; Wang Anyi	Jury Awards	Su Tong	Shadow of the Hunter (黄雀记)
5th 2014	Michael Berry; Chen I-chih; Chen Sihe; Chung Ling; Huang Ziping; Wang Anyi	Highly Recommended	Han Shaogong	The Book of Day and Night (日夜书)
5th 2014	Michael Berry; Chen I-chih; Chen Sihe; Chung Ling; Huang Ziping; Wang Anyi	Highly Recommended	Liu Zhenyun	I Did Not Kill My Husband (我不是潘金莲)
5th 2014	Michael Berry; Chen I-chih; Chen Sihe; Chung Ling; Huang Ziping; Wang Anyi	Highly Recommended	Ye Guangqin	The Matchmaker (状元媒)
6th 2016
6th 2016	Michael Berry; Chen I-chih; Chen Sihe; Chung Ling; Huang Ziping; Wong Bik-Wan			
6th 2016	Michael Berry; Chen I-chih; Chen Sihe; Chung Ling; Huang Ziping; Wong Bik-Wan	Winner	Yan Lianke	The Day the Sun Died (日熄)
6th 2016	Michael Berry; Chen I-chih; Chen Sihe; Chung Ling; Huang Ziping; Wong Bik-Wan	Jury Awards	Xu Zechen	Jerusalem (耶路撒冷)
6th 2016	Michael Berry; Chen I-chih; Chen Sihe; Chung Ling; Huang Ziping; Wong Bik-Wan	Jury Awards	Kan Yao-ming	The Girl and the Woodcutter (邦查女孩)
6th 2016	Michael Berry; Chen I-chih; Chen Sihe; Chung Ling; Huang Ziping; Wong Bik-Wan	Highly Recommended	Chi Zijian	On the Mountain Summit (群山之巅)
6th 2016	Michael Berry; Chen I-chih; Chen Sihe; Chung Ling; Huang Ziping; Wong Bik-Wan	Highly Recommended	Chan Koonchung	The Second Year of Jianfeng: An Alternative History of New China (建丰二年：新中国乌有史)
6th 2016	Michael Berry; Chen I-chih; Chen Sihe; Chung Ling; Huang Ziping; Wong Bik-Wan	Highly Recommended	Wu Ming-yi	The Stolen Bicycle (单车失窃记)
7th 2018
7th 2018	Michael Berry; Chen I-chih; Chen Sihe; Chung Ling; Huang Ziping; Yan Lianke			
7th 2018	Michael Berry; Chen I-chih; Chen Sihe; Chung Ling; Huang Ziping; Yan Lianke	Winner	Liu Qing	History through Words (唇典)
7th 2018	Michael Berry; Chen I-chih; Chen Sihe; Chung Ling; Huang Ziping; Yan Lianke	Jury Awards	William Lien	The Green Cicada (青蚨子)
7th 2018	Michael Berry; Chen I-chih; Chen Sihe; Chung Ling; Huang Ziping; Yan Lianke	Jury Awards	Ge Fei	Longing for the Spring Wind (望春风)
7th 2018	Michael Berry; Chen I-chih; Chen Sihe; Chung Ling; Huang Ziping; Yan Lianke	Highly Recommended	Liu Zhenyun	Strange Bedfellows (吃瓜时代的儿女们)
7th 2018	Michael Berry; Chen I-chih; Chen Sihe; Chung Ling; Huang Ziping; Yan Lianke	Highly Recommended	Wang Ting-kuo	Yesterday’s Rain (昨日雨水)
7th 2018	Michael Berry; Chen I-chih; Chen Sihe; Chung Ling; Huang Ziping; Yan Lianke	Highly Recommended	Zhang Ling	A Single Swallow (劳燕)
8th 2020	Chen I-chih; Chen Sihe; Chung Ling; Huang Ziping; Carlos Rojas; Liu Qing			
8th 2020	Chen I-chih; Chen Sihe; Chung Ling; Huang Ziping; Carlos Rojas; Liu Qing	Winner	Chang Kuei-hsing	When the Wild Boars Cross the River (野猪渡河)
8th 2020	Chen I-chih; Chen Sihe; Chung Ling; Huang Ziping; Carlos Rojas; Liu Qing	Jury Awards	Alai	Chronicle of Cloud Village (云中记)
8th 2020	Chen I-chih; Chen Sihe; Chung Ling; Huang Ziping; Carlos Rojas; Liu Qing	Jury Awards	Dung Kai-cheung	Beloved Wife (爱妻)
8th 2020	Chen I-chih; Chen Sihe; Chung Ling; Huang Ziping; Carlos Rojas; Liu Qing	Jury Awards	Luo Yijun	Superman Kuang (匡超人)
8th 2020	Chen I-chih; Chen Sihe; Chung Ling; Huang Ziping; Carlos Rojas; Liu Qing	Highly Recommended	Xi Xi	Weaverbird (织巢)
8th 2020	Chen I-chih; Chen Sihe; Chung Ling; Huang Ziping; Carlos Rojas; Liu Qing	Highly Recommended	Hu Ching-fang	Islands (群岛)
9th 2022	Chen I-chih; Chen Sihe; Chung Ling; Huang Ziping; Carlos Rojas; Chang Kuei-hsing			
9th 2022	Chen I-chih; Chen Sihe; Chung Ling; Huang Ziping; Carlos Rojas; Chang Kuei-hsing	Winner	Kan Yao-ming	Becoming Bunun (成为真正的人)
9th 2022	Chen I-chih; Chen Sihe; Chung Ling; Huang Ziping; Carlos Rojas; Chang Kuei-hsing	Jury Awards	Dung Kai-cheung	Posthuman Comedy (后人类喜剧)
9th 2022	Chen I-chih; Chen Sihe; Chung Ling; Huang Ziping; Carlos Rojas; Chang Kuei-hsing	Jury Awards	Chan Koonchung	Zero Point Beijing (北京零公里)
9th 2022	Chen I-chih; Chen Sihe; Chung Ling; Huang Ziping; Carlos Rojas; Chang Kuei-hsing	Jury Awards	Yan Lianke	A Chinese Story (中国故事)
9th 2022	Chen I-chih; Chen Sihe; Chung Ling; Huang Ziping; Carlos Rojas; Chang Kuei-hsing	Highly Recommended	Yan Lianke	Heart Sutra (心经)
9th 2022	Chen I-chih; Chen Sihe; Chung Ling; Huang Ziping; Carlos Rojas; Chang Kuei-hsing	Highly Recommended	Chen Yao-chang	Dawn of Formosa (岛之曦)
10th 2024	Chung Ling; Huang Ziping; Ngan Shun-kau; Carlos Rojas; Shiu Wen-wei; Wang Yao; Kan Yao-ming			
10th 2024	Chung Ling; Huang Ziping; Ngan Shun-kau; Carlos Rojas; Shiu Wen-wei; Wang Yao; Kan Yao-ming	Winner	Ge Liang	Food is Heaven (燕食记)
10th 2024	Chung Ling; Huang Ziping; Ngan Shun-kau; Carlos Rojas; Shiu Wen-wei; Wang Yao; Kan Yao-ming	Jury Awards	Ku Yu-ling	Margins of Time (余地)
10th 2024	Chung Ling; Huang Ziping; Ngan Shun-kau; Carlos Rojas; Shiu Wen-wei; Wang Yao; Kan Yao-ming	Jury Awards	Lin Bai	Beiliu (北流)
10th 2024	Chung Ling; Huang Ziping; Ngan Shun-kau; Carlos Rojas; Shiu Wen-wei; Wang Yao; Kan Yao-ming	Highly Recommended	Yan Lianke	Chronicles from the Liaozhai Studio (聊斋本纪)
10th 2024	Chung Ling; Huang Ziping; Ngan Shun-kau; Carlos Rojas; Shiu Wen-wei; Wang Yao; Kan Yao-ming	Highly Recommended	Chung Wenyin	Tears of Trees (木泪)
10th 2024	Chung Ling; Huang Ziping; Ngan Shun-kau; Carlos Rojas; Shiu Wen-wei; Wang Yao; Kan Yao-ming	Highly Recommended	Qiao Ye	Baoshui Village (宝水)
