= Chung Ling (disambiguation) =

Chung Ling (Chinese: 鍾玲; born 1945) is a Taiwan-Chinese writer.

Chung Ling may also refer to:

- Chung Ling High School
- Chung Ling Butterworth High School
- Nadia Chan Chung Ling, a Hong Kong–based actress

== See also ==
- Zhong Ling (disambiguation)
