= Literary Wonderlands =

2016 book by Laura Miller

- Author: Laura Miller, ed.
- Cover artist: Jim Tierney
- Language: English
- Subject: Fictional worlds
- Genre: Literary encyclopedia
- Publisher: Black Dog & Leventhal
- Publication date: 2016
- Publication place: United States
- Pages: 320
- ISBN: 978-0316316385
- OCLC: 943689406
- Dewey Decimal: 809.933
- LC Class: PN56.I44L58 2016

Literary Wonderlands: A Journey Through the Greatest Fictional Worlds Ever Created is a 2016 book edited by Laura Miller, co-founder of Salon.com. It is a compendium of "lands that exist only in the imagination," and covers 2,000 years of literary creation. For each work, an entry provides historical context, plot summary, and author biography.

The contents are divided into five chronological sections covering the following works:

== Ancient Myth & Legend ==
- The Epic of Gilgamesh, c.1750 BCE
- The Odyssey, c.725-675 BCE Homer
- Metamorphoses, c.8 Ovid
- Beowulf, c.700-1100
- The Thousand and One Nights, c.700-947
- The Mabinogion, 12th-14th century
- The Prose Edda, c.1220 Snorri Sturluson
- The Divine Comedy, c.1308-21 Dante Alighieri
- Le Morte d'Arthur, 1485 Thomas Malory
- Orlando Furioso, c.1516/32 Ludovico Ariosto
- Utopia, 1516 Thomas More
- The Faerie Queene, 1590-1609 Edmund Spenser
- Journey to the West (Xiyouji), c.1592 Wu Cheng'en
- The City of the Sun, 1602 Tommaso Campanella
- Don Quixote, 1605/15 Miguel de Cervantes
- The Tempest, 1611 William Shakespeare
- A Voyage to the Moon, 1657 Cyrano de Bergerac
- The Description of a New World, called The Blazing-World, 1666 Margaret Cavendish

== Science & Romanticism ==
- Gulliver's Travels, 1726 Jonathan Swift
- The Journey of Niels Klim to the World Underground, 1741 Ludvig Holberg
- The Water-Babies: A Fairy Tale for a Land Baby, 1863 Charles Kingsley
- Alice's Adventures in Wonderland, 1865 Lewis Carroll
- Twenty Thousand Leagues Under the Seas, 1870 Jules Verne
- Erewhon, 1872 Samuel Butler
- The Ring of the Nibelung, 1876 Richard Wagner
- Treasure Island, 1883 Robert Louis Stevenson
- Flatland: A Romance of Many Dimensions, 1884 Edwin A. Abbott
- Looking Backward: 2000-1887, 1888 Edward Bellamy
- A Connecticut Yankee in King Arthur's Court, 1889 Mark Twain
- The Time Machine, 1895 H. G. Wells
- The Wonderful Wizard of Oz, 1900 L. Frank Baum

== Golden Age of Fantasy ==
- Peter Pan in Kensington Gardens, 1906 J. M. Barrie
- The Lost World, 1912 Arthur Conan Doyle
- At the Earth's Core, 1914 Edgar Rice Burroughs
- Herland, 1915 Charlotte Perkins Gilman
- Tales of Snugglepot and Cuddlepie: Their Adventures Wonderful, 1918 Cecilia May Gibbs
- We, 1924 Yevgeny Zamyatin
- The Castle, 1926 Franz Kafka
- The Cthulhu Mythos, 1928-37 H. P. Lovecraft
- Brave New World, 1932 Aldous Huxley
- Conan the Barbarian, 1932-36 Robert E. Howard
- Alamut, 1938 Vladimir Bartol
- Tlón, Uqbar, Orbis Tertius, 1941 Jorge Luis Borges
- Islandia, 1942 Austin Tappan Wright
- The Little Prince, 1943 Antoine de Saint-Exupéry
- The Moomins and the Great Flood, 1945 Tove Jansson

== New World Order ==
- Gormenghast, 1946-59 Mervyn Peake
- Nineteen Eighty-Four, 1949 George Orwell
- The Chronicles of Narnia, 1950-56 C. S. Lewis
- I, Robot, 1950 Isaac Asimov
- Fahrenheit 451, 1953 Ray Bradbury
- The Lord of the Rings, 1954-55 J. R. R. Tolkien
- Pedro Páramo, 1955 Juan Rulfo
- Solaris, 1961 Stanisław Lem
- A Clockwork Orange, 1962 Anthony Burgess
- Pale Fire, 1962 Vladimir Nabokov
- Planet of the Apes, 1963 Pierre Boulle
- One Hundred Years of Solitude, 1967 Gabriel García Márquez
- A Wizard of Earthsea, 1968 Ursula K. Le Guin
- Do Androids Dream of Electric Sheep?, 1968 Philip K. Dick
- The Last Unicorn, 1968 Peter S. Beagle
- Slaughterhouse-Five, 1969 Kurt Vonnegut
- Ringworld, 1970 Larry Niven
- Invisible Cities, 1972 Italo Calvino
- The Princess Bride, 1973 William Goldman
- Dhalgren, 1975 Samuel R. Delany
- W or the Memory of Childhood, 1975 Georges Perec
- Egalia's Daughters: A Satire of the Sexes, 1977 Gerd Mjøen Brantenberg
- The Bloody Chamber and Other Stories, 1979 Angela Carter
- Kindred, 1979 Octavia E. Butler
- The Hitchhiker's Guide to the Galaxy, 1979 Douglas Adams

== The Computer Age ==
- The Dark Tower series, 1982-2012 Stephen King
- The Discworld series, 1983-2015 Terry Pratchett
- Neuromancer, 1984 William Gibson
- The Handmaid's Tale, 1985 Margaret Atwood
- The Culture series, 1987-2012 Iain M. Banks
- Obabakoak, 1988 Bernardo Atxaga
- The Sandman, 1988-2015 Neil Gaiman et al.
- Snow Crash, 1992 Neal Stephenson
- The Giver, 1993 Lois Lowry
- His Dark Materials, 1995-2000 Philip Pullman
- A Game of Thrones, 1996 George R. R. Martin
- Infinite Jest, 1996 David Foster Wallace
- Harry Potter and the Philosopher's Stone, 1997 J. K. Rowling
- The Bas-Lag cycle, 2000-04 China Miéville
- The Eyre Affair, 2001 Jasper Fforde
- Inkheart, 2003 Cornelia Funke
- Jonathan Strange & Mr. Norrell, 2004 Susanna Clarke
- Cloud Atlas, 2004 David Mitchell
- Never Let Me Go, 2005 Kazuo Ishiguro
- Wizard of the Crow, 2006 Ngũgĩ wa Thiong'o
- The Yiddish Policemen's Union, 2007 Michael Chabon
- The Hunger Games, 2008 Suzanne Collins
- 1Q84, 2009-10 Haruki Murakami
- The Man with the Compound Eyes, 2011 Wu Ming-Yi
- The Imperial Radch trilogy, 2013-15 Ann Leckie
- Lagoon, 2014 Nnedi Okorafor
- Two Years Eight Months and Twenty-Eight Nights, 2015 Salman Rushdie

== Critical response ==
Reviewing the book in The Sydney Morning Herald, Steven Carroll declared that "the sweep is impressive." Andrew Sean Greer, writing in The New York Times, found that the book "does its job admirably: succinctly describing each work in detail and providing enough illustrations to inspire delight." However, he found wide variability in quality among contributors, and he questioned the arbitrary choice of works to include. Alec Scott, writing in The Globe and Mail, faulted the book for not explaining the kinship between fantasy and science-fiction genres, and for its inclusion of "schlock" along with truly literary works. Kirkus Reviews said the book features "an encyclopedia’s breadth and lack of depth."

== See also ==
- The Dictionary of Imaginary Places
- An Atlas of Fantasy
