= Ge Fei =

Ge Fei may refer to:

- Ge Fei (badminton) (born 1975), Olympic badminton player
- Ge Fei (author) (born 1964), author of contemporary Chinese literature
