= Alberto Manguel =

Argentine-Canadian writer and translator (born 1948)

Alberto Manguel OC FRSL
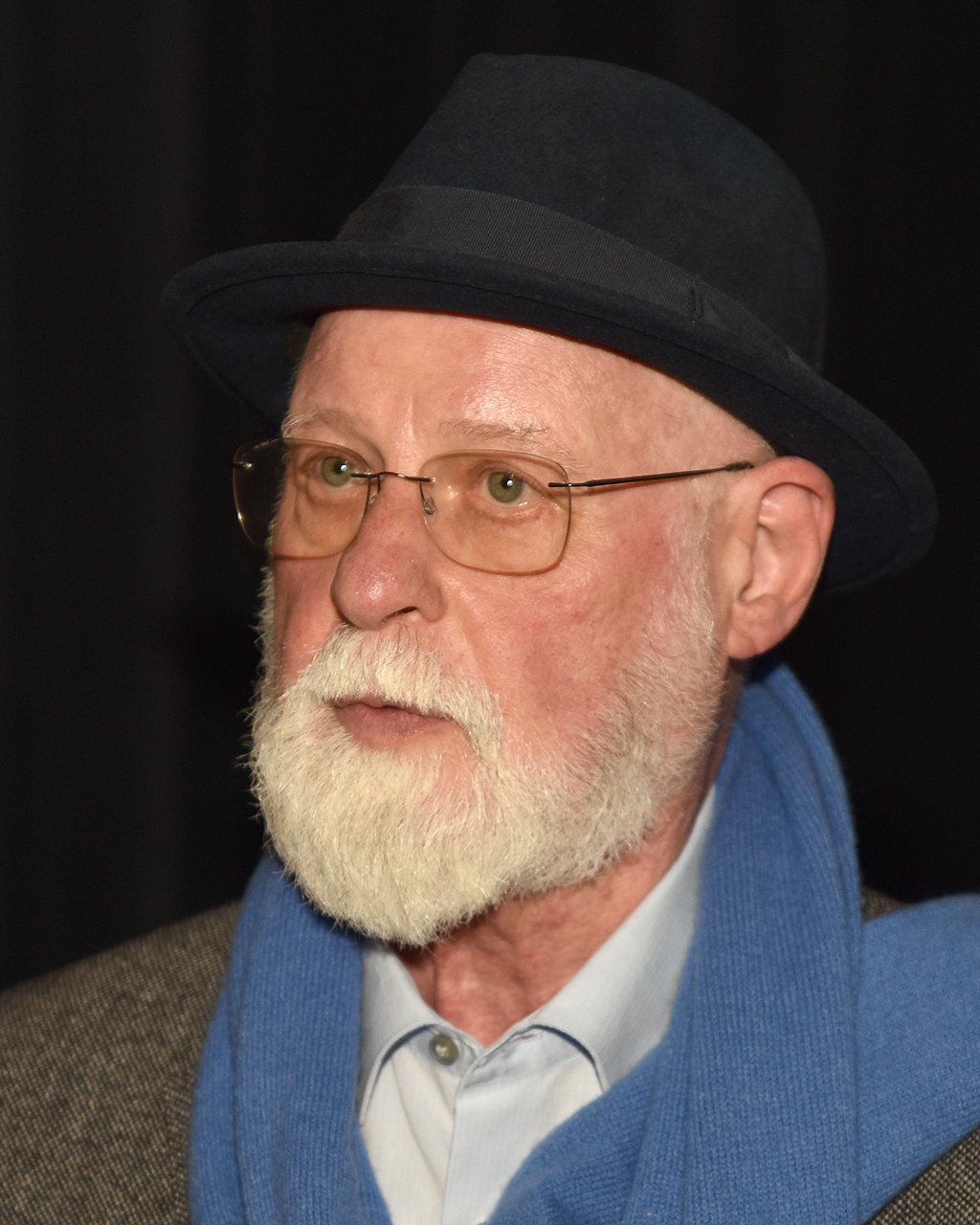
- Manguel in 2025
- Born: Alberto Manguel; March 13, 1948 (age 78); Buenos Aires, Argentina
- Writing career
- Period: 1980–present
- Genres: Novel, essay
- Notable works: A History of Reading, The Dictionary of Imaginary Places

Alberto Manguel OC FRSL (born March 13, 1948, in Buenos Aires) is an Argentine-Canadian anthologist, translator, essayist, novelist, editor, and a former director of the National Library of Argentina. He is a cosmopolitan and polyglot scholar, speaking English, Spanish, German, and French fluently, and also Italian and Portuguese at a very advanced level. He left Argentina at the age of twenty, in 1968. He has lived in Israel (Tel Aviv, 1948-1955), Argentina (Buenos Aires, 1955-1968), France (Paris, 1968-1971, and Poitou-Charentes, 2000-2015), United Kingdom (London, 1972), Italy (Milan, 1974-1979), French Polynesia (Tahiti, 1973-1974), Canada (Toronto, 1980-2000), United States (New York; 2015-2020) and Portugal (Lisbon, since 2021). Since 2021 he has directed an international center for reading studies in Lisbon, baptized in 2023 as Espaço Atlântida; In the biography of the center's website you can read: "He became a Canadian citizen and continues to identify his nationality as first and foremost Canadian."

He is the author of numerous non-fiction books such as The Dictionary of Imaginary Places (co-written with Gianni Guadalupi in 1980), A History of Reading (1996), The Library at Night (2007) and Homer's Iliad and Odyssey: A Biography (2008); and novels such as News From a Foreign Country Came (1991). Though almost all of Manguel's books were written in English, two of his novels (El regreso and Todos los hombres son mentirosos) were written in Spanish, and El regreso has not yet been published in English. Manguel has also written film criticism such as Bride of Frankenstein (1997) and collections of essays such as Into the Looking Glass Wood (1998). In 2007, Manguel was selected to be that year's annual lecturer for the prestigious Massey Lectures. in 2021, he gave the Roger Lancelyn Green lecture to the Lewis Carroll Society on his love of the 'Alice' stories from Lewis Carroll.

For more than twenty years, Manguel has edited a number of literary anthologies on a variety of themes or genres ranging from erotica and gay stories to fantastic literature and mysteries.

== Career ==
Manguel was born to Pablo and Rosalia Manguel, both Jewish. He spent his first years in Israel where his father Pablo was the Argentine ambassador, returning to his native country at the age of seven. Later, in Buenos Aires, when Manguel was still a teenager, he met the writer Jorge Luis Borges, a customer of the Pygmalion Anglo-German bookshop in Buenos Aires where Manguel worked after school. As Borges was almost blind, he would ask others to read out loud for him, and Manguel became one of Borges' readers, several times a week from 1964 to 1968.

In Buenos Aires, Manguel attended the Colegio Nacional de Buenos Aires from 1961 to 1966; among his teachers were notable Argentinian intellectuals such as the historian Alberto Salas, the Cervantes scholar Isaias Lerner and the literary critic Enrique Pezzoni. Manguel did one year (1967) at the Universidad de Buenos Aires, Filosofía y Letras, but he abandoned his studies and started working at the recently founded Editorial Galerna of Guillermo Schavelzon (who thirty-five years later, now established in Barcelona, was to become Manguel's literary agent). In 1969 Manguel travelled to Europe and worked as a reader for various publishing companies: Denoël, Gallimard and Les Lettres Nouvelles in Paris, and Calder & Boyars in London.

=== 1970s ===
In 1971, Manguel, living then in Paris and London, was awarded the Premio La Nación (Buenos Aires) for a collection of short stories. The prize was shared with the writer Bernardo Schiavetta. In 1972 Manguel returned to Buenos Aires and worked for a year as a reporter for the newspaper La Nación. In 1974, he was offered employment as foreign editor at the Franco Maria Ricci publishing company in Milan. Here he met Gianni Guadalupi and later, at Guadalupi's suggestion, wrote with him The Dictionary of Imaginary Places. The book is a travel guide to fantasy lands, islands, cities, and other locations from world literature, including Ruritania, Shangri-La, Xanadu, Atlantis, L. Frank Baum's Oz, Lewis Carroll's Wonderland, Thomas More's Utopia, Edwin Abbott's Flatland, C. S. Lewis' Narnia, and the realms of Francois Rabelais, Jonathan Swift, and J.R.R. Tolkien. In 1976, Manguel moved to Tahiti, where he worked as editor for Les Éditions du Pacifique until 1977. He then worked for the same company in Paris for one year. In 1978 Manguel settled in Milford, Surrey (England) and set up the short-lived Ram Publishing Company. In 1979, Manguel returned to Tahiti to work again for Les Éditions du Pacifique, this time until 1982.

=== 1980s–1990s ===
External videos
- Presentation by Manguel on A History of Reading, October 22, 1996, C-SPAN

In 1982 Manguel moved to Toronto, Ontario, Canada and lived there (with a brief European period) until 2000. He has been a Canadian citizen ever since. Here Manguel contributed regularly to The Globe and Mail (Toronto), The Times Literary Supplement (London), The Village Voice (New York), The Washington Post, The Sydney Morning Herald, The Australian Review of Books, The New York Times and Svenska Dagbladet (Stockholm), and reviewed books and plays for the Canadian Broadcasting Corporation. Manguel's early impression of Canada was that it was "...like one of those places whose existence we assume because of a name on a sign above a platform, glimpsed at as our train stops and then rushes on." (from Passages: Welcome Home to Canada (2002), with preface by Rudyard Griffiths). As well, though, Manguel noted that "When I arrived in Canada, for the first time I felt I was living in a place where I could participate actively as a writer in the running of the state."

In 1983, he selected the stories for what is perhaps his best-known anthology Black Water: The Book of Fantastic Literature. His first novel, "News From a Foreign Country Came", won the McKitterick Prize in 1992.

In 1997, Manguel translated into English The Anatomist, first novel of the Argentine writer Federico Andahazi.

He was appointed as the Distinguished Visiting Writer in the Markin-Flanagan Distinguished Writers Program at the University of Calgary from 1997 to 1999. Manguel was the Opening Lecturer at the "Exile & Migration" Congress, Boston University, in June 1999, and the Times Literary Supplement lecturer in 1997.

=== 2000s ===
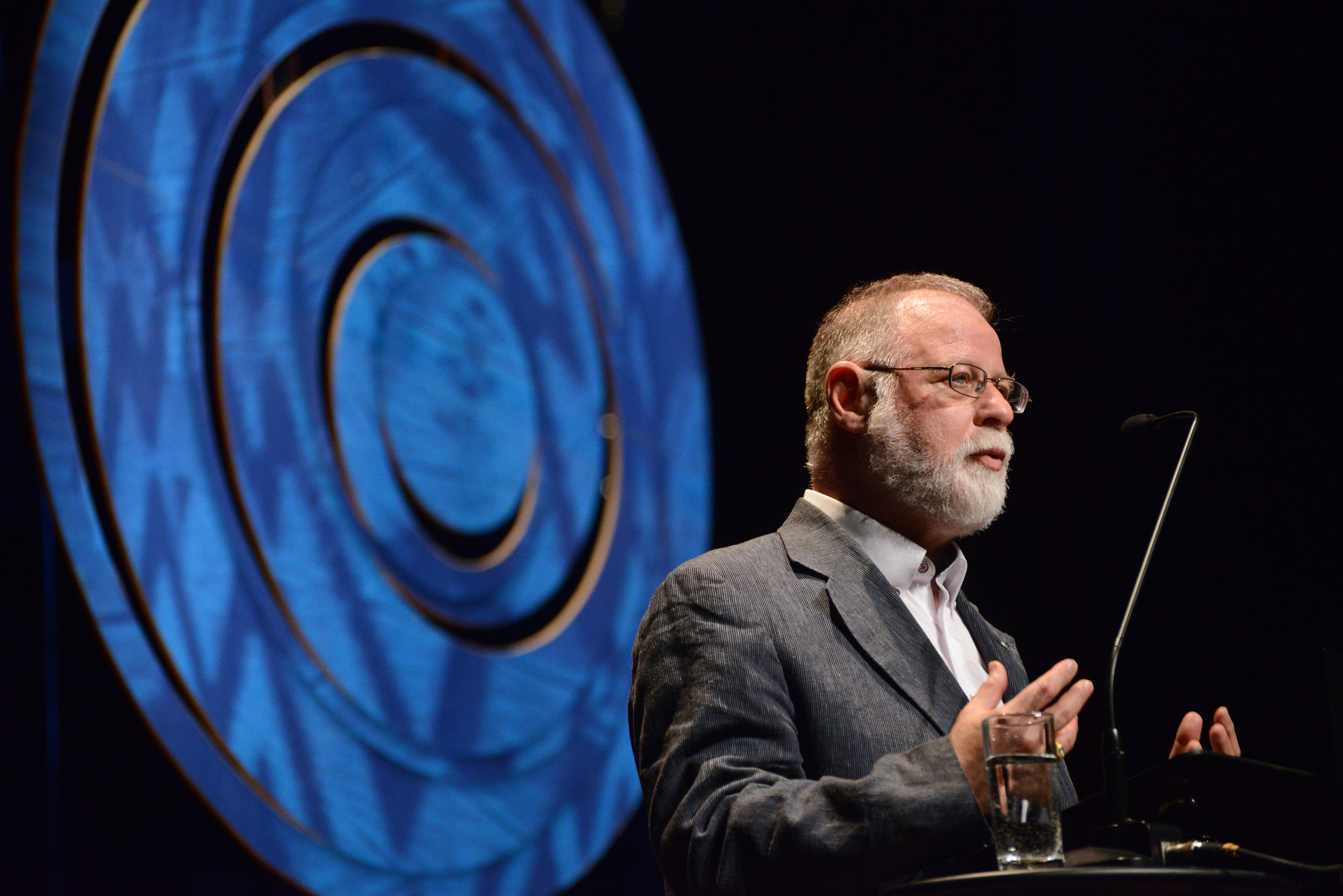
Manguel at Fronteiras do Pensamento (Frontiers of Thought) in 2014

In 2000, Manguel moved to the Poitou-Charentes region of France, where he and his partner purchased and renovated a medieval presbytery. Among the renovations was an oak-panelled library to house Manguel's nearly 40,000 books. In September 2020, the collection was donated to the Centre for Research in the History of Reading in Lisbon, Portugal with Manguel as its head.

Manguel held the Cátedra Cortázar at the Universidad de Guadalajara, Mexico, in 2007 and the S. Fischer Chair at the Freie Universität Berlin, in 2003. In 2007, he received an honorary doctorate from the University of Liège.

Manguel delivered the 2007 Massey Lectures which were later published as The City of Words and in the same year delivered the Northrop Frye-Antonine Maillet Lecture in Moncton, New Brunswick. He was the Pratt Lecturer at Memorial University of Newfoundland, in 2003.

In 2008, the Centre Georges Pompidou in Paris honoured Alberto Manguel as part of its 30th Anniversary Celebrations, by inviting him to set up a three-month long program of lectures, film and round tables.

He writes a regular column for Geist magazine.

Manguel's book History of Reading was referenced as a source of inspiration to the Book of Sand film. He suffered a stroke in December 2013, and reflected on the experience in a 2014 op-ed in The New York Times.

In 2011 he delivered the A.S.W. Rosenbach Lectures in Bibliography, "The Traveller, the Tower and the Worm " at the University of Pennsylvania.

In December 2015 he was named director of the National Library in his native Argentina, replacing Horacio González. Manguel held the post from July 2016 to August 2018.

In 2018 he was awarded the Gutenberg Prize of the International Gutenberg Society and the City of Mainz.

In 2021 he was elected to the Roxburghe Club.

== Personal life ==
He was married to Pauline Ann Brewer from 1975 to 1986, and their children are Alice Emily, Rachel Claire, and Rupert Tobias. Upon divorcing Brewer in 1987, Manguel began seeing his current partner Craig Stephenson.

== Bibliography ==
=== Novels ===
- News from a Foreign Country Came. New York: C. Potter, 1991
- Stevenson Under the Palm Trees. 2003. ISBN 0-88762-138-4
- El regreso (A Return). 2005. ISBN 950-04-2653-6
- Un amant très vétilleux (The Overdiscriminating Lover). 2005, ISBN 978-2-7427-5438-0
- Todos los hombres son mentirosos (All Men Are Liars). 2008. ISBN 978-84-9867-340-1

=== Anthologies ===
- Black Water: The Book of Fantastic Literature, ed. Alberto Manguel. New York: C.N. Potter, 1983
- Dark Arrows: Chronicles of Revenge (1985, anthology) ISBN 0-14-007712-X
- Other Fires: Short Fiction by Latin American Women (1986, anthology) ISBN 0-88619-065-7
- Evening Games: Chronicles of Parents and Children (1986, anthology) ISBN 0-14-007713-8
- Chronicles of Marriage (1988, anthology) ISBN 0-14-009928-X
- The Oxford Book of Canadian Ghost Stories (1990, anthology) ISBN 0-19-540761-X
- Black Water 2: More Tales of the Fantastic (1990, anthology) ISBN 0-88619-124-6
- Soho Square III (1990, anthology) ISBN 0-7475-0716-3
- Seasons (1990, anthology) ISBN 978-0-385-25265-2
- White Fire: Further Fantastic Literature (1990, anthology) ISBN 0-330-31380-0
- Canadian Mystery Stories (1991, anthology) ISBN 0-19-540820-9
- The Gates of Paradise: The Anthology of Erotic Short Literature (1993, anthology) ISBN 0-921912-47-1
- Meanwhile, In Another Part of the Forest: Gay Stories from Alice Munro to Yukio Mishima (1994, anthology) ISBN 0-394-28012-1
- The Second Gates of Paradise: The Anthology of Erotic Short Literature (1994, anthology) ISBN 0-921912-77-3
- Lost Words (1996, anthology), ISBN 978-0-904286-56-4
- By the Light of the Glow-worm Lamp: Three Centuries of Reflections on Nature (1998, anthology) ISBN 0-306-45991-4
- Mothers & Daughters (1998, anthology) ISBN 1-55192-127-8
- Fathers & Sons (1998, anthology) ISBN 1-55192-129-4
- The Ark in the Garden: Fables for Our Times (1998, anthology) ISBN 1-55199-030-X
- God's Spies: Stories in Defiance of Oppression (1999, anthology) ISBN 1-55199-040-7
- The Penguin Book of Christmas Stories (2005, anthology) ISBN 0-670-06449-1
- The Penguin Book of Summer Stories (2007, anthology) ISBN 978-0-14-305629-4

=== Non-fiction ===
- The Dictionary of Imaginary Places, ed. Manguel, Alberto & Guadalupi, Gianni. New York: Macmillan, 1980
- A History of Reading (1996) ISBN 0-394-28032-6
- Bride of Frankenstein (1997, film criticism) ISBN 0-85170-608-8
- Into the Looking Glass Wood (1998, essays) ISBN 0-676-97135-0
- A Visit to the Dream Bookseller / Ein Besuch beim Traumbuchhändler (1998)
- Reading Pictures: A History of Love and Hate (2000, art criticism) ISBN 0-676-97132-6
- Kipling: A Brief Biography for Young Adults (2000), ISBN 1-896209-48-3
- Comment Pinocchio apprit à lire (How Pinocchio Learned to Read, 2000) ISBN 2-88888-102-0
- A Reading Diary (2004) ISBN 0-676-97590-9
- With Borges (2004, biography), ISBN 0-88762-146-5
- The Library at Night (2006) ISBN 0-676-97588-7
- Nuevo elogio de la locura (At the Mad Hatter's Table, 2006) ISBN 978-950-04-2762-3
- Magic Land of Toys (2006) ISBN 978-0-86565-176-0
- The City of Words (CBC Massey Lecture) (2007) ISBN 0-88784-763-3
- Homer's The Iliad and The Odyssey: A Biography. (2007, history and criticism) ISBN 978-0-8021-4382-2
- A Reader on Reading Yale University Press, 2010 ISBN 978-0-300-15982-0
- The Traveler, the Tower, and the Worm: the Reader as Metaphor, 2013 ISBN 978-0-8122-4523-3
- Curiosity. New Haven, Conn.: Yale University Press, 2015
- Packing My Library. Yale University Press, 2018 ISBN 978-0-3002-1933-3

Maimonides, Faith in Reason:Yale University Press, 2023 (ISBN 978-0-300-21789-6) (Part of the Jewish Lives series)

=== Critical studies and reviews ===
- Boyd Tonkin, The Spirit of the Shelves (The Independent, London, April 25, 2008)
- Italo Calvino, The Book of Sand (Article on The Dictionary of Imaginary Places)
- Georges Steiner, reviews of History of Reading and Into the Looking-Glass Wood (The New Yorker)
- P.D. James, review of History of Reading (Sunday Times)
- Jeanette Winterson, review of Reading Pictures (The Times Literary Supplement)
- Peter Conrad, review of The Library at Night
- Peter Ackroyd, review of The Library at Night
- Hector Bianciotti, Une passion en toutes lettres (Gallimard, 2001) (Essay on Manguel)
- Peter Kemp, The Oxford Book of Literary Quotations (Oxford University Press, 1997)
- Anon. (April 11, 2015). "Cabinet of curiosity". Books and Arts. The Economist. Vol. 415, no. 8933. p. 75. Review of Curiosity.

== Prizes and awards ==
- Nonino International Prize, celebrated as a true "Renaissance man" for his contribution to culture and literature (Percoto, Italy, 2024)
- Gutenberg Prize of the International Gutenberg Society and the City of Mainz (Germany, 2018)
- Prix Formentor (Spain, 2017)
- Fellow of the Royal Society of Literature (UK, 2010)
- Medalla al Mérito (Buenos Aires, 2007)
- Milovan Vidakovic Literary Award (Novi Sad, Serbia, 2007)
- Premio Grinzane Cavour, essay for Diario di un lettore (Italy, 2007)
- Doctor Honoris Causa, University of Liège (Belgium, 2007)
- Prix Roger Caillois (France, 2004)
- Fellow of the S. Fischer Stiftung (Germany, 2004–2005)
- Officier de l'Ordre des Arts et des Lettres (France, 2004)
- Fellow of the Simon Guggenheim Foundation (USA, 2004)
- Prix Poitou-Charentes for Chez Borges (France, 2004)
- Premio Germán Sánchez Ruipérez for best literary criticism (Spain, 2002)
- Prix France Culture (Étranger), for Dans la forêt du miroir (France, 2001)
- Prix Médicis Essai, for Une Histoire de la lecture (France, 1998)
- Chevalier de l'Ordre des Arts et des Lettres (France, 1996)
- Harbourfront Award for Contribution to the Arts (Canada, 1992)
- Canadian Writers' Association Award, fiction (Canada, 1992)
- McKitterick First Novel Award (UK, 1992)
- Lewis Gallantière Translation Prize (honourable mention), American Translators Association (USA, 1986)
- German Critics Award for Von Atlantis bis Utopia, German translation of The Dictionary of Imaginary Places (Germany, 1981)
- Literary Award La Nación for short stories (Buenos Aires, 1971)

== See also ==
- 2015 in literature
