= Laura Miller (writer) =

American journalist and critic, co-founder of Salon.com

- Occupation: journalist
- Known for: Book reviewer

Laura Miller is an American journalist and critic based in New York City. She was a co-founder of Salon.com where she worked for 20 years on book reviews and cultural topics. In 2015 she moved to Slate where she became a books and culture columnist. In 2008 she published The Magician's Book: A Skeptic's Adventures in Narnia.

== Early life ==
Miller was raised as a Catholic and grew up in California. She has since said she deplores the Church's "guilt-mongering and tedious rituals."

== Career ==
In 1995, Miller helped to co-found the news website Salon.com where for the next 20 years she worked as a staff writer on book reviews and culture topics. In 2000 she edited The Salon.com Reader's Guide to Contemporary Authors with Adam Begley. She wrote the New York Times Book Review "Last Word" column from 2003-2004. He work has also been published in The New Yorker, Harper's and The Guardian.

In 2008 she authored The Magician's Book: A Skeptic's Adventures in Narnia, a book about C.S. Lewis's The Chronicles of Narnia fantasy series, her enchantment with it as a child, and her disenchantment with it as an adult after realizing its heavy use of religious themes.

In 2015 she became Slate's Books and Culture columnist. In 2016, Miller edited Literary Wonderlands, a literary encyclopedia chronicling the history of fiction.

== Reception ==
Gary L. Tandy in Christianity and Literature called The Magician's Book "Laura Miller's unique and intriguing extended essay about her experience as a lifelong reader of C. S. Lewis' The Chronicles of Narnia." He commented that the book is made interesting by the uneven course of her "love affair" with Lewis's writing; he notes that she admits she is not a Christian, despite her Catholic upbringing. She was therefore surprised to find that when as an adult she re-read the Narnia books, they had not lost their power, prompting her to write this book to explain why. In the book, she both reflects on her own experience and interviews other authors and friends on the subject.

John D. Riley, writing in Against the Grain, described Literary Wonderlands as both "a checklist and guide to essential utopian, dystopian and speculative fiction that you have always been meaning to read" and "a valuable scholarly look back at familiar books and a fresh look forward to more adventurous reading in the future."

== Bibliography ==
=== Books ===
- Miller, Laura (2008). The Magician's Book: A Skeptic's Adventures in Narnia. Little, Brown.
- — (2016). Literary Wonderlands: A Journey Through the Greatest Fictional Worlds Ever Created. Black Dog & Leventhal.

=== Essays, reporting and other contributions ===
- Miller, Laura; Adam Begley, eds. (2000). The Salon.com reader's guide to contemporary authors. New York: Penguin Books.
- Jackson, Shirley (2006). The haunting of Hill House. Foreword by Laura Miller. Penguin Classics.
- — (2013). Come along with me : classic short stories and an unfinished novel. Foreword by Laura Miller. Penguin Classics.
- Miller, Laura (April 21, 2014). "Romancing the stones : on the winter solstice, modern-day Druids flock to Stonehenge". Annals of Archaeology. The New Yorker. 90 (9): 48–54.
- — (September 11, 2014). "It's OK to admit that H.P. Lovecraft was racist". Salon. Archived from the original on September 12, 2014.
- — (January 30, 2017). "Fork you : a life runs four ways in Paul Auster's '4 3 2 1'". The Critics. Books. The New Yorker. 92 (47): 68–69, 71. (Note: Online version is titled "Paul Auster's novel of chance".)
- — (April 24, 2017). "A little stranger: Jeff VanderMeer's postapocalyptic Borne". The Critics. Books. The New Yorker. 93 (10): 96–97. (Note: Online version is titled "Jeff VanderMeer amends the apocalypse".)
- — (July 3, 2017). "Manhattan transfer: money. mischief, and mystery in a novel of old New York". The Critics. Books. The New Yorker. 93 (19): 67–69. (Note: Online version is titled "'Golden Hill' : a crackerjack novel of old Manhattan".)
- — (April 2, 2018). "You're too much: nothing succeeds like excess in Christine Mangan's 'Tangerine'". The Critics. Books. The New Yorker. 94 (7): 90–91. (Note: Online version is titled "'Tangerine' : a début novel that delights in excess".)
- — (January 7, 2019). "The purge: The Water Cure is a twisted fairy tale of toxic masculinity". The Critics. Books. The New Yorker. 94 (43): 68–69. (Note: Online version is titled "A twisted fairy tale about toxic masculinity".)
- — (May 20, 2019). "You'll never get away: girls go missing in Julia Phillips's debut novel". The Critics. Books. The New Yorker. 95 (13): 87–89. (Note: Online version is titled "A début novel remixes the trope of the missing girl".)
