= Zhang Ling (author) =

Chinese writer

- Born: 1957 (age 68–69); Wenzhou, Zhejiang, China
- Occupation: Writer
- Writing career
- Genres: Literary fiction, novel, novella, short story
- Notable works: Where Waters Meet; A Single Swallow; Gold Mountain Blues; Aftershock
- Website: zhanglingwriter.com

Ling Zhang (Chinese: Zhang Ling / 张翎; born 1957) is a Chinese former audiologist and writer residing in Toronto, Canada. She was born in Wenzhou, with ancestral roots in Cangnan, China and moved to Canada in 1986 to pursue her MA in English at University of Calgary. She obtained her second MA degree in Communication disorders at the University of Cincinnati. In the mid-1990s, while working as a clinical audiologist, she started writing and publishing fictional works in Chinese. Since then, she has published ten novels and numerous collections of novellas and short stories.

Ling Zhang has won the Author of the Year Prize of Chinese Media Literature Awards, the Grand Prize of Overseas Chinese Literary Awards, and the Cao Xueqing Chinese Literary Prize. She was also short-listed for Dream of the Red Chamber Award.

In 2009, Zhang's novella Aftershock, about the survival of the horrific 1976 Tangshan earthquake, was made into China's first IMAX movie, Aftershock, directed by Feng Xiaogang. This movie became the greatest box office success at the time and has grossed more than US$100 million at the Chinese box office. According to The Wall Street Journal, Aftershock opens the IMAX market to Chinese films. ABC News also mentions that Aftershock becomes the highest-grossing film in China.

In 2011, a lawsuit was launched against Zhang Ling for alleged copyright infringement from works by three Canadian writers. However, the case was closed with no judgment against either of the parties.

Where Waters Meet is Ling Zhang's debut English novel, "beautifully written and artfully complex," according to San Francisco Book Review. It has also been named one of the 12 books for Tolerance and Understanding (2023) by World Literature Today.

Literary scholar Yifan Jin argues that the contrast between Gold Mountain Blues and Where Waters Meet reflects an evolution in Zhang’s transcultural writing, from portraying immigration as an obstacle to communication between the Chinese diaspora and their homeland to presenting transpacific connections as more fluid and open.

A Single Swallow, the English version of Zhang's novel《劳燕》, listed on 2017 Sina best ten books list/2017 新浪年度十大好书, published by Amazon Crossing in October 2020, has immediately caught the media and readers' interest and was reviewed as “a literary work suffused with prodigious and descriptive exposition.” A Single Swallow became Amazon's #1 Kindle bestseller in Chinese literature and WWII historical fiction. The novel also was the winner of AudioFile Earphones Award and was listed with The New York Times Globetrotting 2021.

== Awards and honours ==
- Special Achievement Award for Overseas Chinese Writer, Chinese Association of Fiction (2010) – 中国小说学会海外作家特别奖
- Grand Prize, Overseas Chinese Literary Awards, (华侨华人文学奖评委会大奖：《阵痛》/Tales of Birthing, 2014)
- Sina Annual Best 10 Books (新浪年度十大好书：《劳燕》/A Single Swallow，2017)
- Tencent Annual Top 10 Original Literary Books (腾讯读书年度文学原创十大好书：Where Waters Meet/《归海》, 2023)
- The Cao Xueqin Chinese Literary Prize (2024) - 张翎《归海》获曹雪芹华语文学大奖

== Selected works ==
=== Novels ===
- Sisters from Shanghai –《 望月》(1998), 作家出版社
- Beyond the Ocean —《交错的彼岸》(2001)，百花文艺出版社
- Mail-Order Bride —《邮购新娘》(2004)，作家出版社
- Gold Mountain Blues —《金山》(2009)，十月文艺出版社; Gold Mountain Blues (English) by Penguin Canada, Le Rêve de la Montagne d'Or (French) by Belfond, and Der Traum vom Goldenen Berg (German) by Schöffling & Co.
- Sleep, Flo, Sleep—《睡吧，芙洛，睡吧》(2011)，十月文艺出版社
- Aftershock —《 唐山大地震》(2013)，花城出版社 Aftershock (English) by Amazon Crossing (2024)
- Tales of Birthing —《阵痛》(2014)，作家出版社
- The Sands of Time —《流年物语》(2016), 十月文艺出版社
- A Single Swallow by Amazon Crossing (2020) —《劳燕》(2017), 人民文学出版社
- Where Waters Meet (2023, English) by Amazon Crossing 《归海》(2023, Chinese), 作家出版社

=== Collections of novellas and short stories ===
- The World of Flesh —《尘世》(2004)，广西人民出版社
- Blind Date — 《盲约》(2005)，花城出版社
- Yan's Journey Home —《雁过澡溪》(2006)，成都时代出版社
- The Aftershock —《余震》(2010)，十月文艺出版社
- A Woman at Forty —《女人四十》(2011)，中国工人出版社
- The Songs of Love —《 恋曲三重奏》(2012)，江苏文艺出版社
- The Darkest Night in Life —《生命中最黑暗的夜晚》(2012)，九州出版社
- A Summer's Tale —《一个夏天的故事》(2013)，花城出版社
- The Way We Survive —《每个人站起来的方式，千姿百态》(2016), 长江文艺出版社
- The Rouge —《胭脂》（2018），长江文艺出版社
- Towards the North —《向北方》（2020），广西师大出版社
- Night Whispers of the Bridge —《廊桥夜话》（2021），广西师大出版社
- Saving the First Wife —《如此曙蓝》（2022)，广西师大出版社
- Urban Strays —《都市猫语》（2024），北京联合出版公司
