= The Dictionary of Imaginary Places =

Book by Alberto Manguel and Gianni Guadalupi

- Title page for The Dictionary of Imaginary Places (1980)
- Author: Alberto Manguel; Gianni Guadalupi
- Language: English
- Publication date: 1980

The Dictionary of Imaginary Places (1980, 1987, 1999) is a book written by Alberto Manguel and Gianni Guadalupi. It takes the form of a catalogue of fantasy lands, islands, cities, and other locations from world literature—"a Baedecker or traveller's guide...a nineteenth-century gazetteer" for mental travelling.

== The book ==
Originally published in 1980 and expanded in 1987 and 1999, the Dictionary covers the terrains that readers of literature would expect—Ruritania and Shangri-La, Xanadu and Atlantis, L. Frank Baum's Oz, Lewis Carroll's Wonderland, Thomas More's Utopia, Edwin Abbott's Flatland, C. S. Lewis' Narnia, and the realms of Jonathan Swift and J. R. R. Tolkien; and also a vast host of other venues, created by authors ranging from Dylan Thomas to Cervantes to Edgar Rice Burroughs, from Carl Sandburg to Rabelais to Sir Arthur Conan Doyle. (Plus the Marx Brothers' Duck Soup, among other non-orthodox texts.)

To remain of manageable size, the Dictionary excludes places that are off the planet Earth (eliminating many science fiction locales), as well as "heavens and hells and places of the future," and literary pseudonyms for existing places, like the Yoknapatawpha County of William Faulkner or the Barsetshire of Anthony Trollope and Angela Thirkell. It compensates by covering a wide range of anonymous and obscure sources, and volumes of forgotten lore.

The book is widely noted for the number and excellence of its illustrations, by Graham Greenfield, and its maps and charts, by James Cook. Guadalupi and Manguel acknowledge Philip Grove's The Imaginary Voyage in Prose Fiction (1941), and Pierre Versins' Encyclopèdie de l'Utopie, des Voyages extraordinaires et de la Science-Fiction (1972), as precedents and inspirations.

The book had an influence on the development of early Japanese role-playing video games at Nihon Falcom.

== See also ==
- An Atlas of Fantasy
- Literary Wonderlands
- Atlas des Géographes d'Orbæ, a French young adult fiction series by François Place, blending storytelling with richly illustrated maps to depict an imaginative world.
- Lewis-Jones, Huw, ed. (2018). The Writer's Map: An Atlas of Imaginary Lands. Chicago: University of Chicago Press. ISBN 978-0-226-59663-1.
