= Black Water: The Anthology of Fantastic Literature =

Black Water: The Anthology of Fantastic Literature is an anthology of short stories edited by Alberto Manguel published in 1983.

== Plot summary ==
Black Water is a collection of 72 short stories from various writers. A second volume Black Water 2 : More Tales of the Fantastic was published by C. Potter in 1990.

== Reception ==
Dave Langford reviewed Black Water for White Dwarf #50, and stated that "Refreshingly different: despite a few duds you can't complain at [this price]."

== Reviews ==
- Review by Brian Stableford (1984) in Fantasy Review, August 1984
- Review by Judith Hanna (1985) in Interzone, #11 Spring 1985
- Review by Lin Carter (1987) in Crypt of Cthulhu, #45 Candlemas 1987
