= Zhong Ling =

Zhong Ling may refer to:

- Zhong Ling (rhythmic gymnast) (born 1983), Chinese
- Zhong Ling (Demi-Gods and Semi-Devils), a female fictional character in the novel Demi-Gods and Semi-Devils
- Chung Ling (born 1945), Taiwan/Chinese poet, translator and critic
