= The Stolen Bicycle =

2015 novel by Wu Ming-yi

- Author: Wu Ming-yi
- Original title: 單車失竊記
- Translator: Darryl Sterk
- Language: Taiwanese Mandarin, Taiwanese Hokkien, Japanese
- Publisher: Rye Field Publishing (Taiwan); Text Publishing
- Publication date: 2015
- ISBN: 978-1-911-23124-0

The Stolen Bicycle (Chinese: 單車失竊記) is a novel by Taiwanese writer Wu Ming-yi. It was first published in Taiwan in 2015. In 2017, it was translated into English by Darryl Sterk. In 2018, the novel was longlisted for the International Booker Prize.

== Plot ==
After his father disappeared many years ago, Ch'eng, a writer, believes that he may be able to find out what happened to his father if he can track down his father's stolen bicycle. When he finally finds the stolen bicycle, he discovers the unexpected journey following its theft, along with stories of other bicycles, the soldiers who fought in the jungles of south east Asia during the Second World War, and the oldest elephant that ever lived.

== Reception ==
The Taipei Times reviewer Bradley Winterton called The Stolen Bicycle "a very strange novel, and a very beautiful one", "poetic", and an "unusual and deftly-crafted book". Bron Sibree of the South China Morning Post wrote that the book was "profoundly moving" and "confounds conventional expectations of narrative pace and form, even as it burrows deep into the reader's conscience".

== See also ==
- The Man with the Compound Eyes
