= An Atlas of Fantasy =

1973 book by Jeremiah Benjamin Post

- Cover, revised edition
- Author: J. B. Post
- Illustrator: various
- Language: English
- Subject: Fictional locations
- Genre: Fiction, Atlas
- Publisher: Ballantine Books
- Publication date: 1979
- Publication place: United States
- Media type: print
- Pages: 210
- ISBN: 0-345-27399-0
- OCLC: 5149068
- Dewey Decimal: 912/.1/398
- LC Class: G3122 .P6 1979

An Atlas of Fantasy, compiled by Jeremiah Benjamin Post, was originally published in 1973 by Mirage Press and revised for a 1979 edition by Ballantine Books. The 1979 edition dropped twelve maps from the first edition and added fourteen new ones. It also included an introduction by Lester del Rey.

To remain of manageable size, the Atlas excludes advertising maps, cartograms, most disproportionate maps, and alternate history ("might have been") maps, focusing instead on imaginary lands derived from literary sources. It purposefully omits "one-to-one" maps such as Thomas Hardy's Wessex (which merely renames places in southwest England), but includes Barsetshire and Yoknapatawpha County, which are evidently considered to be sufficiently fictionalized. The emphasis is on science fiction and fantasy, though Post suggests there exist enough mystery fiction maps to someday create The Detectives' Handy Pocket Atlas. Other maps were omitted due to permission costs or reproduction quality.

The maps are reproduced from many sources, and an Index of Artists is included.

== Reception ==
Stephen L. Lortz reviewed An Atlas of Fantasy for Different Worlds magazine and stated that "An Atlas of Fantasy has provided me with many hours of entertainment as well as a number of inspirations for my FRP campaign, and in my opinion, belongs on the reference shelf of every Game Master and fantasist."

== Reviews ==
- Review by William P. Hall Jr. (1974) in Cross Plains V1n4, July–August 1974
- Review by Stuart David Schiff (1974) in Whispers #4, July 1974
- Review by Greg Bear (1974) in Luna Monthly, #56, November 1974
- Review by uncredited (1975) in Amra V2n63, April 1975
- Review by David L. Greene (1975) in The Baum Bugle, Spring 1975
- Review by Richard Mathews (1979) in Science Fiction & Fantasy Book Review, July 1979
- Review by Lewis Pulsipher (1983) in Dragon Magazine, April 1983

== See also ==
- The Dictionary of Imaginary Places
- Literary Wonderlands
- Lewis-Jones, Huw, ed. (2018). The Writer's Map: An Atlas of Imaginary Lands. Chicago: University of Chicago Press. ISBN 978-0-226-59663-1.
