= Dung Kai-cheung =

Hong Kong fiction writer (born 1967)

Dung Kai-cheung 董啟章 is a Hong Kong fiction writer, journalist, playwright, and essayist. Born in 1967, he received his B.A. and M. Phil. in comparative literature from the University of Hong Kong. He has been described as Hong Kong's most accomplished writer. He works as a part-time lecturer at The Chinese University of Hong Kong and mainly teaches Chinese writing. His wife, Wong Nim Yan works as associate professor at the Chinese department of The Chinese University of Hong Kong. His most important novels include "Atlas," "Histories of Time" and other award-winning books.

== Influences ==
Dung's writings were heavily influenced by the older generation of Hong Kong writers, including Liu Yichang, Leung Ping-kwan, and Xi Xi, who he claims were his most important sources of inspiration and models for aspiration. Their works are representative of Hong Kong literature in terms of language, literary forms, and subject matter.

On the influence of the English language, Dung studied Comparative Literature at the University of Hong Kong, and much of his readings were done in English. The influence went beyond the subject matter and literary forms but also of sentence structure and diction. To many language purists, Dung's Chinese has been regarded as "Europeanised."

== Beloved Wife ==
The novel Beloved Wife has been deemed as Dung's most-strikingly experimental works with the attempt of trying to renegotiate the relationship between man and machines. With the novel's focus on AI, Dung believes that one day they might outnumber the human population and actually replace humans by being better at what they do. In his novels, he imagines AIs as having a human body in which the consciousness is connected to or replaced by an AI-like technology. His view resonated with Martin Heidegger's idea of 'wordling', (Being and Time, 1927), whereby the world is not something out there, objectively there, or somewhere ideally there, and we set off to find it. The world is the thing that we live in and created by our experience. If humans learn things like that, AI can also learn this way and not be fed information on ideal things.

== Awards ==
- Hong Kong Arts Development Council Rookie Award (1997)
- 2008 Hong Kong Art Development Award」Best Artist of the year (Literature) (2008)
- Best Translated Work Award-Science Fiction & Fantasy Translation Awards (2013) for "Atlas" Atlas depicts an imaginary city that is set in Victoria, a fictional city similar to Hong Kong. The story reflects the colonial past of Hong Kong, it was an extraordinary social critique.
- Hong Kong Book Fair Author of the Year (2014)
- 2017 Hong Kong Book Award
- 2018 Hong Kong Book Award
- 2019 Taipei International Book Exhibition

== Works ==
=== Short story collections and novels ===
- The Souvenir Album (1995)
- Xiaodong Campus (1996）
- The Family Curriculum (1996）
- Andrew Jenney (1996）
- Evolution of a Nonexistent Species (1996)
- Atlas: The Archaeology of an Imaginary City (1996)
- The Double Body (1997)
- The Rose of the Name (1997)
- The Storyteller (1997)
- Visible Cities (1998)
- The Catalog (1999)
- A Brief History of the Silverfish (2002)
- The History of the Adventures of Vivi and Vera (2005)
- Heavenly Creations, Lifelike (2005)
- Histories of Time (2007)
- The Age of Learning (2010)
