= Chang Kuei-hsing =

Sinophone Malaysian writer based in Taiwan

Chang Kuei-hsing (Chinese: 張貴興; pinyin: Zhāng Guìxīng; Pe̍h-ōe-jī: Tiuⁿ Kùi-heng; Hakka Chinese Pha̍k-fa-sṳ: Chông Kui-hin, b. 1956) is a Taiwanese author, novelist and educator. Born in North Borneo (Sarawak), Malaysia in a Hakka family, he "[grew] up in a state of Sarawak amidst a racially mixed Chinese and native communities".

== Early life and education ==
In his childhood, Chang has accounted his experiences living alongside the Sarawak rainforests and travelling deep into the jungles alongside his Indigenous Dayak friends.

Chang moved to Taiwan in 1976 to attend university at National Taiwan Normal University, where he also earned a degree in English. He pursued a higher education and careers in Taiwan due to his "marginal status in Malaysia" and the support of the Taiwan government's "long-standing incentive scholarship programs". He later had taught English at a high school in Taipei for almost forty years. During that time, he was writing a series of novels, many set partly in Borneo and partly in Taiwan.

== Critical reception ==
Literary critics often classify him as a representative of Malaysian-Chinese Sinophone writing who writes in the mode of magical realism, often "confronting such history of invasion and exploitation as a third-generation Sinophone Malaysian" writer.

Chang's writings are unique, in the sense that they have "adopted a transgressive role to investigate and manipulate the structural limits of language and cultural supremacy of major literatures in the (re)shaping of identity, identification, and the politics of acculturation". His works tend to revolve around a wild environment, where he often uses the Borneo jungle and its civilizations as a main setting, which is exemplified in some of his novels such as My South Seas Sleeping Beauty (analyzed in a series of video lectures) and Herd of Elephants.

For example, his novel Herd of Elephants (also known as Elephant Herd and Elephant Tropes), “employs poetic wordplay and explores anthropological metaphors of movement from the two competing homelands - one in original (Borneo) and the other imaginary (China)” (Tan, 236) providing a Sinophone metanarrative to spread cultural and historical knowledge on the topics of Sinophone Malaysian literature. The "main diegesis begins in late 1973, at a crucial turning point in Sarawak's multi-decade Communist insurgency". Herd of Elephants revolves around a protagonist Shi Shicai, who is on a mission to murder his uncle Yu Jiatong to avenge for the death of his elder brothers. The backdrop of the story reflects the "struggle between the Communist insurgency and government forces that are a threat to the newly independent Southeast Asian nation states of Malaysia and Indonesia" (Rojas, 113); however, Chang overlaps two sets of the southern movement (one being the Chinese presence and the other the indigenous presence) to complete a complex novel with a twist to the end plot. Herd of Elephants is a novel of "how a region in the Global South itself (in this case, the Malaysian state of Sarawak) is impacted by metaphorically infectious agents linked to a powerful nation directly to North (namely, China)".

== Literary style and cultural references ==
=== Sinophone writing style ===
Sinophone writing examines "parsing hierarchies of power relations often defined by neo-colonialism, imperialism, and nationalism". Chang Kuei-hsing's Sinophone literature is acknowledged to allow the Global South to extend beyond its empirical category and examine the implications of globalization through minor literatures. Many scholars have examined Chang Kuei-hsing's work in their research in Sinophone literature as “a manifestation of linguistic and narrative heteroglossia”, mediation for history rewriting in Sinophone literature”, and “literary tropes to depict interethnic relations and Chinese settler history”. Chang Kuei-hsing's Elephant Herd is an example of his Sinophone literature, revealing a settler community history through war, colonialism, racial tension, national liberation, and communism into one. In Chang's work he "offers tales of violence, bigotry, incest, and destruction and his narratives are products of a different kind of settler-colonial historiography".

=== Reference to Sinophone Malaysians in Sarawak ===
The majority of Chang's novel highlights the political geography of Sinophone Malaysians that "continue to occupy an ambiguous position as the country's non-native majority and as an ethnic minority marginalized by national policies favouring the majority Malay". He goes on to depict the study of "settler-colonial" (Huang, 240) concept that is "economically privileged by politically disadvantaged minority who lives alongside a regionally prominent but legally embattled population". The ambiguity of the history regarding the Sinophone Malaysian community is elaborated by Chang's literary devotion to offering explorations of the "settler history amidst the entangled colonial, postcolonial, and interracial relations in the Sarawak rainforest".'

=== Use of anthropomorphism ===
Anthropomorphism is a literary technique used by Chang in many of his novels such as Elephant Herd and Monkey Cup. His mode of writing creates binary relationship between human beings and animals but not to only discuss "national and ethnic issues" or environmental issues but to reveal a "deep-rooted animality in human nature". An example of Chang's critique of "human exploitation of the natural world" is drawn in "repetitive scenes where humans destroy the rainforest vegetation and hunt local wildlife". The usage of animals in Chang's literary works is to "manifest an ecological world in which both humans and animals are members of the same dynamic ecological system, interactively participating in the material energy cycle" and to form a never ending cycle where both species need each other to live.

== Books ==
- Tiger Ambush 伏虎(Hakka Chinese Pha̍k-fa-sṳ: Fu̍k-fú) (1979)
- Herd of Elephants 群象(Hakka Chinese Pha̍k-fa-sṳ: Khiùn-siong) (1998)
- Monkey Cup 猴杯(Hakka Chinese Pha̍k-fa-sṳ:Hèu-pûi) (2000)
- My South Seas Sleeping Beauty 我思念的長眠中的南國公主(Hakka Chinese Pha̍k-fa-sṳ: Ngài Sṳ̂-nyam Ti̍t Chhòng-mìn Chung Ti̍t Nàm-kwet Kûng-chú) (2001)
- Salon Grandmother 沙龍祖母(Hakka Chinese Pha̍k-fa-sṳ: Sâ-liòng Tsú-mû) (2013)
- The Crossing of the Boars 野豬渡河 (aka Wild Boars Ford the River) (Hakka Chinese Pha̍k-fa-sṳ: Yâ-chû Thu-hò) (2018; rev. 2024)
- Eyelids of Morning 鱷眼晨曦 (2023)

== Translations ==
- My South Sea's Sleeping Beauty: A Tale of Memory and Longing. Translated by Valerie Jaffee. New York: Columbia University Press, 2007. ISBN 978-0-231-14058-4.
- Siren Song. Translated by Anna Gustafson. (January 2016)
- La Traversée des sangliers. Translated by Pierre-Mong Lim. Picquier, 2022.
- Elephant Herd: A Novel. Translated by Carlos Rojas. New York: Columbia University Press, 2025. ISBN 978-0-231-21169-7.
- The Crossing of the Boars. Translated by Christopher Rea and Julie M. Wang. New York: Columbia University Press, 2026. ISBN 978-0-231-21767-5.

== Literary awards ==
Throughout 1980s-1990s Chang has influenced the literary culture across the Sinophone world and is one of the most decorated living authors writing in Chinese. Chang has won literary awards in Taiwan, Malaysia, and Hong Kong, including three prizes for Monkey Cup (2000), numerous awards for The Crossing of the Boars (1998), including the 2019 Taiwan Literature Award and the 8th Dream of the Red Chamber Award for "The World’s Most Distinguished Contemporary Novel in Chinese."

In March 2023, Chang was awarded the eighth Newman Prize for Chinese Literature at the University of Oklahoma.

In 2023 and 2024, Eyelids of Morning won several major literary awards, including the 2023 Taiwan Literature Award.
