= Wong Bik-Wan =

Hong Kong writer

- Born: 1961 (age 64–65); Hong Kong
- Writing career
- Genres: Novels, short stories
- Notable works: 《溫柔與暴烈》Wenrou yu baolie, Tenderness and Violence, 《烈女圖》Lienü tu [Portraits of martyred women,《烈佬傳》 Lielao zhuan, Children of Darkness
- Literary movement: Postcolonial literature, Sinophone

Wong Bik-wan (Cantonese pronunciation) or Huang Biyun (Mandarin pronunciation, traditional Chinese: 黃碧雲; simplified Chinese: 黄碧云; born 1961) is a Hong Kong writer. She has received multiple literary awards in Hong Kong, and is cited in The Cambridge History of Chinese Literature as a major contemporary writer.

== Early life ==
Wong was born into a Hong Kong Hakka family. She did part of her high school in Taiwan.

== Education and early career ==
Wong graduated from The Chinese University of Hong Kong with a BA majoring in journalism and communication in 1984. She then worked as a screenwriter for TVB for a year. In 1987, she studied French and French literature at Université Paris 1 Panthéon-Sorbonne. In 1988, she travelled to New York to work at a Chinese-language press in New York. She then received her MA degree in criminology under the Department of Sociology in the University of Hong Kong. Meanwhile, she also obtained a Diploma of Legal Studies in the HKU School of Professional and Continuing Education. Apart from her work as a fiction writer, she has worked as a reporter for The Standard, as a legislative assistant, and as a screenwriter for a broadcasting company.

== Writing style ==
Although her use of words and style often change with time, she still sticks to common themes like death, diseases, love and darkness. Some touch upon the year 1997 when Hong Kong was handed over to the People's Republic of China.

== Notable awards and recognition ==
Year	Works	Awards
1994	《溫柔與暴烈》Wenrou yu baolie, Tenderness and Violence	The 3rd Hong Kong Biennial Awards for Chinese Literature in Fiction
1996	《我們如此很好》Women ruci henhao [We are quite okay like this]	The 4th Hong Kong Biennial Awards for Chinese Literature in Essays
1997	/	The 1st New Talent Award for Literature from the Hong Kong Arts Development Council
1999	《烈女圖》Lienü tu [Portraits of martyred women]	中國時報開卷十大好書獎（中文創作類）China Times Open Book Award (Chinese Fiction)
2000	〈桃花紅〉Taohua hong [Peach blossom red], compiled in《無愛紀》Wuai ji [Loveless]	花蹤文學獎第一屆世界華文小說首獎 First Prize in the 1st Hua Zong Literary Award for Sinophone Novels
2000	《烈女圖》Lienü tu [Portraits of martyred women]	The 6th Hong Kong Biennial Awards for Chinese Literature in Fiction
2001	《無愛紀 》Wuai ji [Loveless]	台灣聯合報讀書人最佳書獎（文學類）The United Daily News of Taiwan Award (Literature)
2003	《後殖民誌》 Hou zhimin zhi [Postcolonial records]	台灣聯合報讀書人最佳書獎（文學類）The United Daily News of Taiwan Award (Literature)
2012	《烈佬傳》 Lielao zhuan, Children of Darkness	The 12th Hong Kong Biennial Awards for Chinese Literature in Fiction
2014	《烈佬傳》 Lielao zhuan, Children of Darkness	The 5th Dream of the Red Chamber Award

== Works ==
=== Novels and short stories ===
- 小城無故事 Xiaocheng wu gushi [No stories in a small town] (1990, a compilation)
- 溫柔與暴烈 Wenrou yu baolie, Tenderness and Violence (1994)
- 她是女子，我也是女子 Ta shi nüzi, wo ye shi nüzi [She's a woman, I'm a woman] (1994)
- 七宗罪 Qi zong zui [Seven deadly sins] (1997)
- 突然我記起你的臉 Turan wo jiqi ni de lian [Suddenly I recall your face] (1998)
- 烈女圖 Lienü tu [Portraits of martyred women] (1999)
- 七種靜默 Qi zhong jingmo [Seven types of silence] (2000)
- 媚行者 Meixing zhe [Beautiful sojourner] (2000)
- 十二女色 Shier nüse [Twelve female charms] (2000)
- 無愛紀 Wuai ji [Loveless] (2001)
- 血卡門 Xie kamen [Blood Carmen] (2001)
- 其後 Qihou [Thereafter] (2004)
- 沉默暗啞微小 Chenmo, anya, weixiao [Reticence, muteness, humility] (2004)
- 末日酒店 Mori jiudian [Doomsday hotel] (2011)
- 烈佬傳 Lielao zhuan, Children of Darkness (2012)
- 微喜重行 Weixi chongxing [The re-walking of Mei-hei] (2014)
- 盧麒之死 Luqi zhi si, The Death of Lo Kei (2018)

=== Prose and essays ===
- 揚眉女子Yangmei nüzi [A proud woman] (1987)
- 我們如此很好 Women ruci henhao [We are quite okay like this] (1996)
- 又喊又笑：阿婆口述歷史 You han you xiao: apo koushu lishi [Tears and laughter: an oral history of Apo's lives] (1999, a compilation)
- 後殖民誌 Hou zhimin zhi [Postcolonial records] (2003)
