= Kan Yao-ming =

Taiwanese writer

- 甘耀明
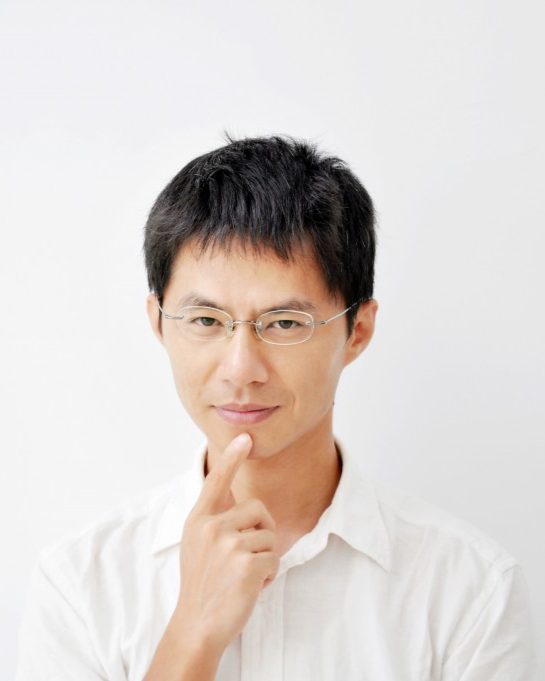
- Born: 2 February 1972 (age 54)
- Education: Tunghai University (BA); National Dong Hwa University (MFA)
- Occupation: Writer

Kan Yao-ming (Chinese: 甘耀明; pinyin: Gān Yào-míng; Wade–Giles: Kan Yao-ming; born 2 February 1972) is a Taiwanese writer.

Several of his novels have been adapted into television series. He has also served as writer-in-residence at Providence University.

== Early life and education ==
Kan was born in Miaoli, Taiwan. He graduated from Tunghai University with a Bachelor of Arts in Chinese literature. He then earned a Master of Fine Arts (M.F.A.) in creative writing and English literature from National Dong Hwa University. Before becoming a full-time fiction writer, Kan worked as a reporter, as a middle school teacher, and as a playwright of a small theater.

== Writing career ==
Owing to his Hakka origin, Kan's writings are often colored with Hakka language, culture and history. In addition, Kan often uses dense imagery while appropriating elements from fairy tale, fable, and folklore. As a result, the feelings of humans and animals become interchangeable but at the same time remain distinct; the complex interactions among Taiwan's various ethnic and social groups are revealed as well. Kan is best known for the following two books:

The School of Water-ghosts and the Otter Who Lost His Mother melds various fairy-tale elements together; it received the China Times Annual Top 10 Book Award, with critics calling it that year's "most creative novel".

Killing Ghosts, a historical novel, deals with issues of Taiwanese identities resulting from fifty years of the Japanese occupation and from the iron-fist rule of the KMT after World War II. Kan Yao-ming, against the backdrops of the Kominka Movement (the Japanization of Taiwanese Movement in 1937 during the second Sino-Japan War) and the 228 Incident (the cause of the KMT's enforcement of martial law on Taiwan from 1947 to 1987), depicts the insanity of that era as well as the unfailing vitality of people living on the island of Taiwan, be they post-World War II Mainland Chinese emigres, or the natives formerly colonized by the Japanese.

== Awards and honor ==
Kan has received various literary awards, including the United Daily News Literature Prize, the Lin Rong-San Literature Prize, Wu Zhuo-liu Literature Prize, and the United Daily New Novelist Prize. In 2010, his novel Killing Ghosts won the Award of Taipei International Book Fair, and in 2015, his The Pangcah Girl won the First Prize of Taiwan Literary Award.

== Publications ==
=== Novels ===
- Mysterious Train 《神秘列車》(Aquarius Publishing, 2003)
- The School of Water-ghosts and the Otter Who Lost His Mother 《水鬼學校和失去媽媽的水獺》 (Aquarius Publishing, 2005)
- Killing Ghosts 《殺鬼》(Aquarius Publishing, 2009)
- Story of a Funeral 《喪禮上的故事》(Aquarius Publishing, 2010)
- The Girl and the Woodcutter 《邦查女孩》(Aquarius Publishing, 2015)
- The Summer General Winter Came 《冬將軍來的夏天》(Aquarius Publishing, 2017)
- Becoming Bunun 《成為真正的人》(Aquarius Publishing, 2021)

=== Essays ===
- Together with Li Chong-jian, A School with No Walls: An Independent Learning Paradise (Aquarius Publishing, 2004)
