= Ge Fei (author) =

Chinese novelist

Liu Yong
- 刘勇
- Born: August 22, 1964 (age 62); Dantu, Jiangsu, China
- Education: East China Normal University
- Occupation: Novelist
- Writing career
- Pen name: Ge Fei (格非)
- Language: Chinese
- Period: 1986 - present
- Genre: Novel
- Notable work: Jiangnan Trilogy
- Literary movement: Avant-Garde (Xianfeng) Literature

Ge Fei (Chinese: 格非; pinyin: Gé Fēi; Wade–Giles: Ke Fei, born August 22, 1964) is the pen name of novelist Liu Yong (刘勇), considered by many scholars and critics to be one of the most significant of the Chinese avant-garde writers that rose to prominence in the 1980s and 1990s.

== Life and work ==
Ge Fei was born in Dantu, Jiangsu, in 1964. He studied Chinese literature at East China Normal University and, after graduating in 1985, began to teach there and publish short stories and novellas. He read widely during his studies, but has since noted that he was particularly influenced by Borges, Faulkner and Robbe-Grillet. Some of his early, more experimental works were translated into English in the 1990s, such as "The Lost Boat", "Remembering Mr. Wu You" and "Green Yellow".

After completing The Banner of Desire (Yuwang de qizhi), Ge Fei took a break from literary writing to concentrate on his academic career. He completed his PhD in 2000 and became a professor at Tsinghua University in Beijing.

In 2004, Peach Blossom Paradise (Renmian taohua) was published, the first book of what has become known as the "Jiangnan Trilogy", which explores the concept of utopia and contains many allusions to Cao Xueqin's Dream of the Red Chamber. An English translation of Peach Blossom Paradise was published in 2020 and selected as a finalist for the National Book Award for Translated Literature in 2021. The second and third books, My Dream of the Mountain and River (Shanhe rumeng, 2007) and The Last Spring in Jiangnan (Chunjin jiangnan, 2011), have yet to be translated into English. For this trilogy, he was one of the winners of the Mao Dun Literature Prize in 2015.

In 2016, The Invisibility Cloak (which had won both the Lu Xun Literary Prize and the Lao She Literary Award in 2014) was the first of his longer works to be translated into English. A translation of an earlier novella from 1988, Flock of Brown Birds, was also published later in 2016.

== Selected bibliography ==
=== Novels ===
- 《敌人》 [Diren] (1990). The Enemy
- 《欲望的旗帜》 [Yuwang de qizhi] (1995). The Banner of Desire
- 《人面桃花》 [Renmian taohua] (2004). Peach Blossom Paradise, trans. Canaan Morse (New York Review Books, 2020).
- 《山河入梦》 [Shanhe rumeng] (2007). My Dream of the Mountain and River
- 《春尽江南》 [Chunjin jiangnan] (2011). The Last Spring in Jiangnan
- 《月落荒寺》[Yueluo huangsi] (2019). Moonfall on the Deserted Temple

=== Novellas and short stories ===
- 《追忆乌攸先生》 [Zhuiyi Wu You xiansheng] (1986). Remembering Mr. Wu You
- 《陷阱》 [Xianjing] (1987). The Trap
- 《迷舟》 [Mizhou] (1987). The Lost Boat
- 《大年》 [Da nian] (1988). New Year's Eve
- 《褐色鸟群》 [Hese niaoqun] (1988). Flock of Brown Birds, trans. Poppy Toland (Penguin, 2016).
- 《青黄》 [Qinghuang] (1988). Green Yellow
- 《边缘》 (Bianyuan) (1992). The Margin
- 《锦瑟》 [Jinse] (1993).
- 《相遇》 [Xiangyu] (1993). The Encounter
- 《隐身衣》 [Yinshen yi] (2012). The Invisibility Cloak, trans. Canaan Morse (New York Review Books, 2016).
- 《望春风》 [Wang chunfeng] (2016). Waiting for the Spring Breeze

=== In anthologies and journals ===
- "The Lost Boat" (trans. Caroline Mason), in The Lost Boat: Avant-Garde Fiction from China, ed. Henry Zhao (1993)
- "Meetings" (trans. Deborah Mills), in Abandoned Wine: Chinese Writing from Today (1996)
- "Remembering Mr. Wu You" (trans. Howard Goldblatt); "Green Yellow" (trans. Eva Shan Chou); "Whistling" (trans. Victor H. Mair), in China's Avant-Garde Fiction: An Anthology, ed. Jing Wang (1998)
- "Encounter", in Tales of Tibet: Sky Burials, Prayer Wheels, and Wind Horses, trans. and ed. Herbert J. Batt (2001)
- "Ring Flower" (trans. Eleanor Goodman), in Chinese Literature Today (2017)
- "Song of Liangzhou" (trans. Charles A. Laughlin), in Chinese Literature Today (2017)

=== Scholarly publications ===
- 《小说叙事学》 (1992). Narratology of the Novel
- 《卡夫卡的钟摆》 [Kafuka de zhongbai] (2004). Kafka's Pendulum
- 《文学的邀约》 [Wenxue de yaoyue] (2010). The Invitation of Literature
- 《雪隐鹭鸶——金瓶梅的声色与虚无》 (2014). Egret Hidden in the Snow - The Sound, Color and Nothingness of Jin Ping Mei

== Awards and honors ==
- 2012: Dream of the Red Chamber Award for The Last Spring in Jiangnan
- 2014: Lu Xun Literary Prize for The Invisibility Cloak
- 2014: Lao She Literary Award for The Invisibility Cloak
- 2015: Mao Dun Literature Prize for Jiangnan Trilogy
