= Bernardo Schiavetta =

Argentine writer and psychiatrist

Bernardo Schiavetta (born 1948) is an Argentine writer and psychiatrist. Born in Córdoba, Argentina, he has lived in Paris since 1972.

== Works ==
=== Poetry ===
- Diálogo (Valencia, Prometeo, 1983) Premio Gules 1983
- Fórmulas para Cratilo (Madrid, Visor, 1990) Premio Loewe 1990
- Espejos (Madrid, Loewe Foundation, 1990).
- Entrelíneas (Córdoba, Argentina, Alción, 1992).
- Con mudo acento (Albacete, Barcarola, 1996). Premio Barcarola 1996.
- Texto de Penélope, diálogos con Didier Coste (Córdoba, Argentina, Alción, 1999).

=== Novels ===
- Gregorio Ruedas (in Antología de Literatura Fantástica Argentina del Siglo XX, Buenos Aires, Kapelusz, 1973).

=== Essay ===
- Le goût de la forme en littérature, Noésis, Paris, 2001.
