= Cao Naiqian =

Chinese writer

- 曹乃谦
- Born: Cao Naitian; February 1949 (age 77); Ying County, Shanxi, China
- Education: Datong No. 1 High School
- Occupations: Novelist, essayist
- Writing career
- Language: Chinese
- Period: 1986–present
- Genres: Novel, prose
- Notable work: There Is Nothing I Can Do When I Think of You Late at Night
- Literary movement: Rural literature

Cao Naiqian (simplified Chinese: 曹乃谦; traditional Chinese: 曹乃謙; pinyin: Cáo Naǐqiān; born February 1949) is a Chinese novelist and essayist. He is a member of the China Writers Association. He is the director of Shanxi Writers Association and vice-president of Datong Writers Association.

== Biography ==
Cao was born Cao Naitian (曹乃天) in Ying County, Shanxi in February 1949, he has a childhood name Zhaoren (招人). He attended Dashizi School (大十字小学) and Datong No. 5 Meddle School. In 1965, the year before the Cultural Revolution, he was accepted to Datong No. 1 High School. After high school, his studies was interrupted by the Cultural Revolution, he forced to work in the fields instead of going to university. In 1968 he worked as a coal miner in the Jinhua Gongkuang (晋华宫矿), and one year later he was transferred to the Art Troupe of Datong Bureau of Mine Affairs. In October 1972, he was transferred again to the Bureau of Public Security as a criminal police. He started to publish works in 1986, at the age of 37. In 1991, he joined the China Writers Association. In 1995, one of his articles was included in the first issue of Reader's Digest.

== Works ==
=== Novellas ===
- The Loneliness of Buddha (佛的孤独)

=== Novels ===
- There Is Nothing I Can Do When I Think of You Late at Night (到黑夜我想你没办法)

=== Short stories ===
- The Last Village (最后的村庄)
- The Old Man (老汉)

=== Proses and poems ===
- My Life Notes (我的人生笔记)
