= Luo Yijun =

Taiwanese writer (born 1967)

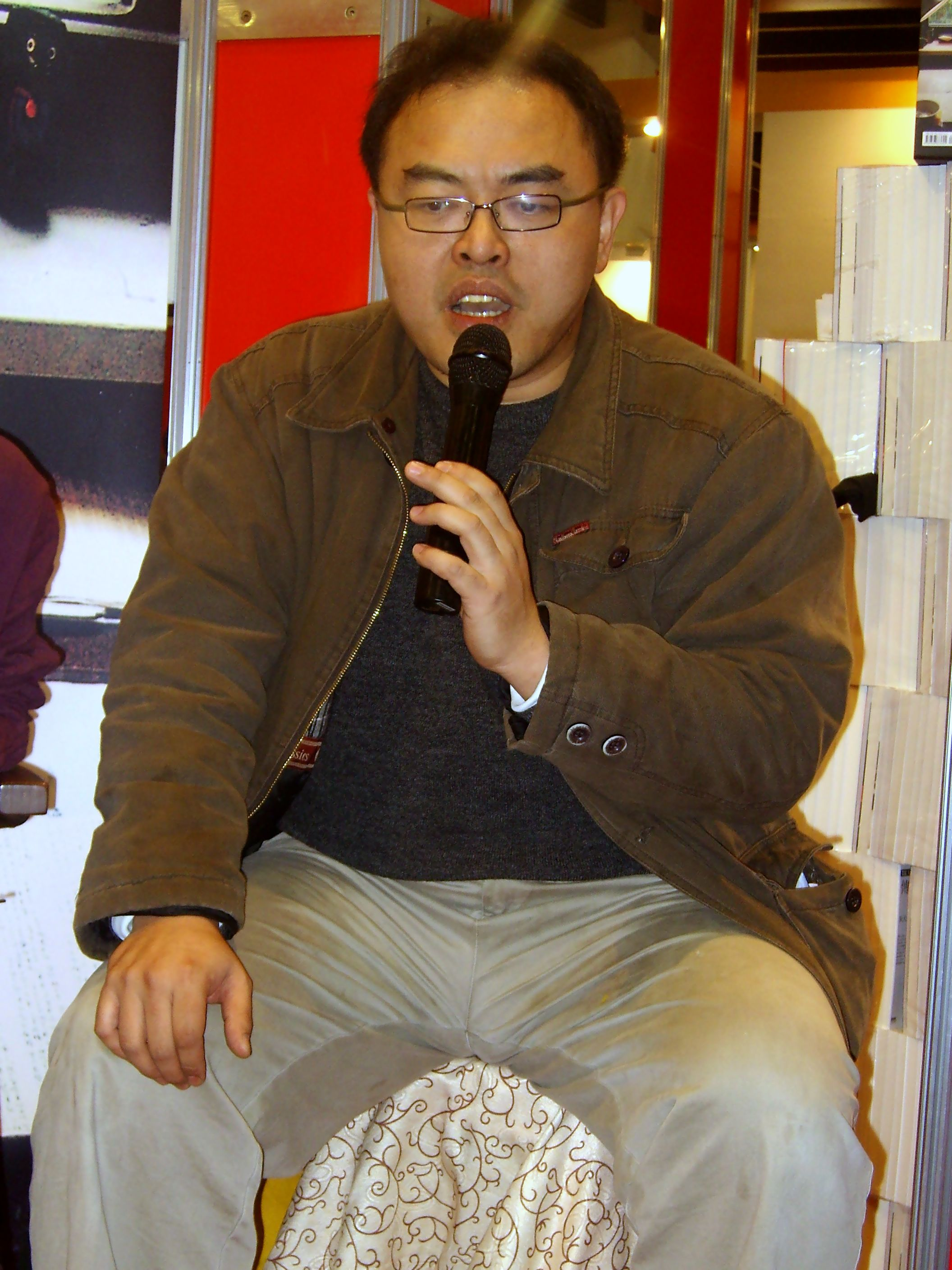
- Born: 29 March 1967 (age 59); Taipei, Taiwan
- Education: Chinese Culture University, Taipei National University of the Arts
- Occupations: Novelist, poet, essayist, literary critic
- Writing career
- Language: Chinese
- Genres: Literary fiction, Poetry, Essays, Literary criticism

Luo Yijun (Chinese: 駱以軍; pinyin: Luò Yǐjūn; born 29 March 1967) is a Taiwanese writer.

== Biography ==
Luo attended Chinese Culture University, where he studied Chinese literature under authors such as Zhang Dachun, who influenced his early style; he later earned a master's degree in theater from Taipei National University of the Arts. His works include fiction, poetry, essays, and literary criticism. He is the recipient of numerous awards including the China Times Literature Award and the 10th United Daily News Literature Prize. In 2007, he was a visiting writer at the Iowa Writers' Workshop.

== Themes and Style ==
The only child of mainland Chinese immigrants who fled the Kuomintang, Luo has attributed the themes of alienation and migration in novels such as Tangut Inn, which combines science fiction with characteristics of postmodern literature, or the quasi-autobiographical vignettes that comprise We, to his own experience of cultural outsiderness growing up in Taiwan. His style has been described by David Der-wei Wang as "pseudo-autobiographical intimate narratives constituting a relay race of fragments, filled with uncanny and decadent imagery and undergirded by an immoral worldview".

== Legacy and Impact ==
Luo's essay collection My Little Boys (小兒子) has been adapted into a play by Huang Zhi-kai of the theater troupe Story Works (故事工廠).

Luo's Tangut Inn has been adapted into a play by Wei Ing-chuan (魏瑛娟).

Xu Rong-zhe (許榮哲), Taiwanese author of the novel 迷藏 (Mi-Cang), once said that he was influenced by Luo Yijun and Taiwanese author Yuan Zhe-sheng (袁哲生).

== Awards and honors ==
YEAR	WORKS	AWARDS	HOST	RANK
1988	"Red Character Group"	The UNITAS Taiwan Islandwide Literature Camp Award for Best Story	United Literature	Fiction Award
1989	"Roach"	National Students’ Literature Award	Mingdao Literature	Recommendation Prize
1990	"A Roll of Film"	The UNITAS Literature Award for New Writers	United Literature	Honorable Prize
1991	"Toy Gun King"	China Times Literature Award	China Times	Audition Prize
1993	Red Character Group	10 Best Books of the Year by the Book and Literature Section “The Book Lovers”	United Daily News	
1993	"Born Into the Twelfth Sign"	Collected Short Stories 1993	ErYa Publishing House, Yizhi Chen Edition	
1998	"Elegy"	Collected Short Stories 1998	China Times	
1999	The Third Dancer	10 Best Books of the Year and Literature Section “Opening Books”	China Times	
2000	Family of the Moon	10 Best Books of the Year Chiu Ko Novel of the Year Award	Chiu Ko Publisher	Taipei Literature Year Award
2000	"Five Stories of Jetlag"	Third Taipei Literature Award	Taipei Cultural Bureau	
2008	Tangut Inn	Asian Magazine of Ten Chinese Good Books of Novel	Asian Magazine	
2009	Tangut Inn	Taiwan Literature Award	National Taiwan Literature Museum	Golden Long Novel Prize
2010	Tangut Inn	The 3rd Dream of the Red Chamber Award	Hong Kong Jinhui University of Literature Department	1st Prize
2014	Daughter	The Year of the Chinese Best Books and Literature Section “Opening Books”	China Times	
2014	Daughter	Taipei International Ten Best Books Award of Asian Magazine	Asian Magazine	
2015	Daughter	Taipei International Book Exhibition Nobel Prize in Literature	Taipei International Book Exhibition	
2018	Alphabets A-F	Fifth Literary Great of United Daily News award	United Daily News	

== Bibliography ==
=== Short story collections ===
● The Red Ink Gang / Red Character Group (Taipei: Unitas Publishing. 1993. ISBN 9575225813)

● We Left the Bar of the Night (Crown culture Publishing. 1993. ISBN 9573310260)

● Wife Dreams of Dog (Yuan-Liou Publishing. 1998. ISBN 9578286058)

● We / Us (Taipei: INK Publishing. 2004. ISBN 9867420233)

● Nativity of the Zodiacs / Born Into the Twelfth Sign (Taipei: INK Publishing. 2005. ISBN 9867420322)

● Letter / Alphabets A-F (Participation: Chen Xue, Tong Wei Ge, Yan Zhong Xian, Hu Shu Wen, Yang Kai Lin) (Acropolis Publishing. 2017. ISBN 9869533426)

=== Novels ===
● The Third Dancer (Taipei: Unitas Publishing. 1999. ISBN 957522258X)

● Moon Family / Family of the Moon (Taipei: Unitas Publishing. 2000. ISBN 9575223047)

● Elegy (Taipei: Rye Field Publishing. 2001. ISBN 9574697096)

● The Distance / Far Away (Taipei: INK Publishing. 2003. ISBN 9867810481)

● My Future 2nd Son’s Memory of Me (Taipei: INK Publishing. 2005. ISBN 9789867420961)

● Tangut Inn (Taipei: INK Publishing. 2008. ISBN 9789866631276)

● Daughter (Taipei: INK Publishing. 2014. ISBN 9789863445296)

● Kuang chao ren (匡超人) (Rye Field Publishing. 2017. ISBN 9789863445296)

=== Prose ===
● Wo ai luo (我愛羅) (Taipei: INK Publishing. 2006. ISBN 9867108302)

● In Search of Lost Time (Taipei: INK Publishing. 2006. ISBN 9789866631313)

● Jingji da xiaotiao shiqi de mengyou jie (經驗大蕭條時期的夢遊街) (Taipei: INK Publishing. 2009. ISBN 9789866377051)

● Face Book (Taipei: INK Publishing. 2012. ISBN 9789866135767)

● My Little Boys (Taipei: INK Publishing. 2014. ISBN 9789865823610)

● May Our Joy Stay: My Little Boys 2 (Taipei: INK Publishing. 2015. ISBN 9789863870821)

● Fitness v.s. Fatness (with Dung Kai Cheung) (Taipei: INK Publishing. 2016. ISBN 9789863870913)

● Hu ren shuo shu (胡人說書) (Taipei: INK Publishing. 2017. ISBN 9789863871422)

● Chun zhen de dan you (純真的擔憂) (Taipei: INK Publishing. 2018. ISBN 9789863872566)

● Taxi Driver (Taipei: INK Publishing. 2018. ISBN 9789863872573)

=== Fairy tales ===
● Children's Tales for the Little Star (Crown Culture Publishing. 1994. ISBN 957331147X)

=== Poems ===
● Luo Yi Jun’s Poetry: The Story of Abandonment (Self-published. 1995.)

● The Story of Abandonment (Taipei: INK Publishing. 2013. ISBN 9789865933487

=== Plays ===
● Qing xie (傾斜) (graduation production of The Graduate Institute of Theatre Arts and Playwriting in Taipei National University of Arts, 1995)

=== Picture books ===
● Kafei guan li de jiaohuan gushi (咖啡館裡的交換故事) (with Li Ya, Xi Niu, Wang Yan Kai, Lin Yi jie, Xiao Ya quan, Chen Yong kai, Sun Yi Ping, Huo chai, Lan Han Jie, Tin Tin & A Qiao, Guo Yu Yi, Zeng Yu Jie, etc.) (Locus Publishing. 2010. ISBN 9789862131848)

● My Little Boys: Ye wan bao shi bao long (夜晚暴食暴龍) (Taipei: INK Publishing. 2018. ISBN 9789863872443)

● My Little Boys: Ming da de zhang lang (命大的蟑螂) (Taipei: INK Publishing. 2018. ISBN 9789863872450)

● My Little Boys: You yong (游泳) (Taipei: INK Publishing. 2018. ISBN 9789863872504)

● My Little Boys: Lan san (爛傘) (Taipei: INK Publishing. 2018. ISBN 9789863872511)

● My Little Boys: Chao jia (吵架) (Taipei: INK Publishing. 2018. ISBN 9789863872597)

=== Editor in Chief ===
● Collected Short Stories 2009 (Editor in chief: Luo Yi Jun. Chiu Ko Publishing. 2010. ISBN 9789574446650)

● Pi mei mao de fa qing ──LP xiao shuo xuan (媲美貓的發情-LP小說選) (Editor in Chief: Luo Yi Jun and Huang Jin Shu. Aquarius Culture Publishing. 2007. ISBN 9789866745041)

=== English Translations ===
● Far Away, translated by Jeremy Tiang (New York: Columbia University Press, 2021. ISBN 9780231193955)
