= The Man with the Compound Eyes =

2011 novel by Wu Ming-yi

- First edition cover
- Author: Wu Ming-yi
- Original title: 複眼人
- Publisher: 夏日出版社 (Summer Festival Press)
- Publication date: 2011

The Man with the Compound Eyes (Chinese: 複眼人) is a novel by Taiwanese writer Wu Ming-yi. It was first published in Taiwan in 2011 by Summer Festival Press. In 2013, it became Wu's first novel to be translated into English, being translated by Darryl Sterk, and was released simultaneously in the United Kingdom and in the United States. Before publication, an extract of the novel was published in the online literary journal Asymptote.

Described as an ecological parable, the novel details the lives of several characters living in and around the Taiwanese coastal town of Haven whose lives have been impacted by climate change.

== Plot ==
Atile'i is a teenage boy and a member of the Wayo Wayo who inhabit a small island and have almost no contact with the outside world. Because resources are scarce, second sons are sent out in boats as teenagers to die. Atile'i goes out, but as his boat sinks, he is able to swim to an "island" which is actually a trash vortex. Atile'i survives on the island though he notices that animals who eat from it die, and he begins to think he is trapped in hell.

In the coast town of Haven, Taiwan, a professor Alice Shih has become suicidal after her Danish husband and their son disappeared during a hike. Alice lives in a house built by her husband that was initially built near the sea, but because of erosion is now almost completely flooded. Initially planning to kill herself, Alice decides to live after she rescues a kitten as it floats by her house.

A news report announces that a part of the trash vortex is about to break free and come in contact with the coast of Taiwan. As it hits the shore, it also is accompanied by a huge wave which permanently destroys Alice's sea house and the only other structure along the shore, the nearby cafe the Seventh Sisid. After Alice's kitten goes missing, she looks for it and discovers Atile'i, with a leg injury. Because he is afraid of strangers, she has her friend, Dahu, loan her his hunting cabin, and she lives there together with Atile'i as he heals.

Alice decides to go to the spot where she believes her husband's body was found after he died during the hike. In various sections Alice's husband Thomas's death is described as is his meeting with a man with compound eyes who tells Thomas he is dead and also informs him that his and Alice's son Toto died years ago and his presence was a product of Alice's writing and a delusion on her part. Alice then returns home and begins writing a book and a short story, both entitled "The Man With the Compound Eyes."

Almost a year later, Dahu is travelling with some friends when he hears a news report about a young woman being picked up off the Gulf of Mexico. This is Rasula, Atile'i's love, who was pregnant with his child. She falls into a coma and becomes brain dead, but her child is born via caesarean section and is healthy despite being born with sirenomelia.

Because of the trash vortex, the coast of Taiwan is permanently altered as is the weather. Atile'i leaves Alice to try to find Rasula and return to Wayo Wayo. Wayo Wayo is later completely destroyed and the population wiped out when a tsunami hits the island.

== Reception ==
The novel was positively reviewed. Anita Felicelli writing for The Rumpus praised it as "stylistically interesting". Jason Sheenhan writing for NPR called it an "achingly sad book with tears on every page." Tash Aw writing for The Guardian called Wu "a deft novelist".

== See also ==
- The Stolen Bicycle
