= Wu Ming-yi =

Taiwanese writer

- 吳明益
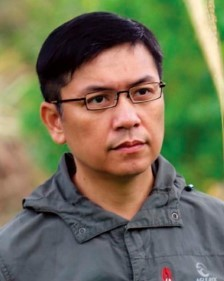
- Born: 20 June 1971 (age 55); Taoyuan, Taiwan (now Taoyuan District, Taoyuan City)
- Education: National Central University; Fu Jen Catholic University
- Occupations: Author, Scholar
- Writing career
- Notable works: The Man with the Compound Eyes (2011); The Stolen Bicycle (2015)
- Notable awards: Dream of the Red Chamber Award final candidate (2016); Man Booker International Prize nomination (2018)
- Website: Wu Ming-yi

Wu Ming-yi
- Traditional Chinese: 吳明益
- Simplified Chinese: 吳明益
Transcriptions
Standard Mandarin
- Hanyu Pinyin: Wú Míngyì

Wu Ming-yi (Chinese: 吳明益; born 20 June 1971) is a multidisciplinary Taiwanese writer and scholar. Wu has published collections of essays, short stories and novels. He is best known for his novels The Man with the Compound Eyes and The Stolen Bicycle, the latter of which was longlisted for the International Booker Prize in 2018.

== Early life and education ==
Born and raised in Taoyuan, Taiwan (now Taoyuan District, Taoyuan), Wu holds a BA in Mass Communication from Fu Jen Catholic University, focusing on advertising. Later, he pursued a PhD in Chinese Literature from National Central University.

== Career ==
In the 1990s, Wu started writing short stories. He published his first short story collection, We’re Closed Today 《本日公休》, in 1997.

In 2000, Wu became an Assistant Professor of Sinophone Literatures at National Dong Hwa University, where he taught nature writing, modern literature, literary theory and creative writing. In 2012, he became a Professor through publications of his extraordinary creative writing works.

An environmental activist, Wu is especially well-known for his non-fiction books on butterflies, The Book of Lost Butterflies 《迷蝶誌》(2000) and The Dao of Butterflies 《蝶道》(2003), in which he also designed and illustrated the artworks.

Wu is also a prolific essayist. His first monograph, Liberating Nature through Writing 《以書寫解放自然：台灣現代自然書寫的探索》, was published in 2004. The second edition of this book, re-titled as The Search for Modern Taiwanese Nature Writing 1980-2002: Liberating Nature through Writing 《臺灣現代自然書寫的探索 1980-2002：以書寫解放自然 BOOK 1》, becomes the first book of the trilogy Liberating Nature through Writing 《以書寫解放自然》.

Wu is one of the few Taiwanese writers whose works have been translated into English, French, Turkish, Japanese, Korean, Czech and Indonesian. In 2018, Wu became the first Taiwanese nominee of Man Booker International Prize for fiction. Wu is considered one of the major Taiwanese writers of his generation.

After teaching courses such as Chinese literature and nature writing, Wu gathered ideas for writing Grandfather Tiger 《虎爺》. Wu began writing his first novel, Routes in the Dream 《睡眠的航線》. It was published by 2-fishes in 2007. The French version, Les Lignes de navigation du sommeil, is translated by Gwennaël Gaffric (關首奇) and published in 2012. Wu was promoted to Associate Professor in 2010 through publications of creative writing. He began working on materials which later became The Illusionist on the Skywalk 《天橋上的魔術師》.

Wu’s second novel, The Man with the Compound Eyes 《複眼人》, was published in 2011. In this ecological parable, Wu tells the story of Atile’I, a young Pacific islander indigenous to the fictitious island of Wayo Wayo, arriving on the East Coast of Taiwan when the ‘trash vortex,’ a floating mountain of trash formed out of the Great Pacific Trash Vortex, collides with the island. The name Wayo Wayo is suggestive of Bora Bora, meaning “made by the gods” in Tahitian. The book has been described as “a masterpiece of environmental literature about an apocalyptic aboriginal encounter with modernity. ... Trash, resource shortages, and the destruction of Taiwan’s coastline as a result of the pursuit of unenlightened self-interest are unremarkable raw materials, but [Wu Mingyi] mashes them into art.” His literature agent described it as a “Taiwanese Life of Pi.” The English version, The Man with the Compound Eyes, translated by Darryl Sterk (石岱崙), was published by Harvill Secker in 2013. In a blurb for The Man with the Compound Eyes, Le Guin wrote that “Wu Ming-Yi treats human vulnerability and the world’s vulnerability with fearless tenderness.” Furthermore, Wu’s storytelling provides “a new way of telling out new reality” that is “beautiful, entertaining, frightening, preposterous” and “true.”

Following the success of The Man with the Compound Eyes, Wu began working on his third novel The Stolen Bicycle 《單車失竊記》. The book has been described as a study of bicycles in Taiwan during World War II. In 2015, it was selected as “The Best Chinese Fiction Books of the Last Century” on Time Out Beijing. Translated by Darryl Sterk (石岱崙), the English version of The Stolen Bicycle was published by Text Publishing in 2017. In March 2018, the English translation was nominated for the Man Booker International Prize. It became the center of a diplomatic dispute when, after pressure from the People’s Republic of China, the awards organizer changed his nationality from Taiwan to “Taiwan, China“. In April 2018, the Man Booker International Prize made the final call stating that “Wu Ming-Yi is listed as ‘Taiwan‘“.

Wu published The Land of Little Rain《苦雨之地》in 2019. The Chinese title of the book borrows from the American nature writer Mary Austin’s book of the same name. In The Sea Breeze Club《海風酒店》 (2023), Wu tells a story of a Taroko boy chasing white dogs and a Han Chinese girl who ran away from home to avoid being sold by her father, entering the ‘inner soles’ (lāi-tué) of giants from their own villages. Meanwhile, a crab-eating mongoose, whose paw was severed by a trap’s pincers, also hides under the giant’s eyelashes. As it gradually heals, the surviving three-legged crab-eating mongoose shuttles between the giants and the tribes.

== Publications ==
=== Novels ===
- Routes in the Dream 《睡眠的航線》(Taipei: 2-fishes, 2007)
  - l French Translation; translated by Gwennaël Gaffric (關首奇): Les Lignes de navigation du sommeil (Paris: Éditions You Feng, 2012).
  - l Japanese Translation; translated by Tomoaki Kuramoto倉本知明): 《眠りの航路》 (東京：白水社, 2021).
- The Man with the Compound Eyes 《複眼人》(Taipei: Summer Festival, 2011)
  - l English Translation; translated by Darryl Sterk (石岱崙): The Man with the Compound Eyes (London: Harvill Secker, 2013).
  - l French Translation; translated by Gwennaël Gaffric (關首奇): L’homme aux yeux à facettes (Paris: Éditions Stock, 2014).
  - l Turkish Translation; translated by Seda Çıngay: Petekgözlü Adam (Istanbul: Kahve Yayınları, 2015).
  - l Czech Translation; translated by Pavlína Krámská: Muž Fasetovýma Očima (Nakladatel: Mi:Lú Publishing, 2016).
  - l Indonesian Translation; translated by The Man With The Compound Eyes (Jakarta :PRENADA MEDIA, 2017).
  - l Hungarian Translation; translated by Major Kornélia: Rovarszemű ember (Pécs: Jelenkor Kiadó, 2018).
  - l Polish Translation; translated by Katarzyna Sarek: Człowiek o fasetkowych oczach (Warsaw: Kwiaty Orientu Publishing House, 2019).
  - l Tamil Translation; translated by Yuvan Chandrasekar: The Man with the Compound Eyes (Tamil) (Nagercoil: KALACHUVADU PUBLICATIONS, 2019).
  - l Swedish Translation; translated by Roger Heshan Eriksson: Fasetter av liv (Swedish) (lettland: Chin Lit, 2020).
  - l Italian Translation; translated by Silvia Pozzi (傅雪蓮): Montagne e nuvole negli occhi (Roma: E/O, 2021).
  - l Japanese Translation; translated by Oguriyama Tomo小栗山 智: 《複眼人》 (Tokyo：KADOKAWA, 2021).
  - l Vietnamese Translation; translated by Nguyễn Phúc An: NGƯỜI MẮT KÉP (Hồ Chí Minh: Phanbook, 2021).
  - l Russian Translation; translated by Vitaly Andreev (衛大力): Человек с фасеточными глазами (Moscow:AST, 2021).
  - l German Translation; translated by Johannes Fiederling (唐悠翰): Der Mann mit den Facettenaugen (Berlin: Matthes & Seitz Berlin, 2022).
  - l Catalan Translation; translated by Mireia Vargas Urpí: l’home dels ulls compostos (Barcelona: Chronos Editorial, 2022).
- The Stolen Bicycle 《單車失竊記》(Taipei: Cite Publishing Ltd., 2015)
  - l English Translation; translated by Darryl Sterk (石岱崙): The Stolen Bicycle (Melbourne: Text Publishing, 2017).
  - l Japanese Translation; translated by Amano Kentaro 天野健太郎: 《自転車泥棒》(東京：文藝春秋，2018).
  - l Hungarian Translation; translated by Major Kornélia: Az ellopott bicikli (Pécs: Jelenkor Kiadó, 2020).
  - l Swedish Translation; translated by Britta Kinnemark: Den Stulna Cykeln(Swedish) (lettland: Chin Lit, 2020).
  - l Vietnamese Translation; translated by Nguyễn Tú Uyên: CHIẾC XE ĐẠP MẤT CẮP (Ho Chi Minh City: NXB Hội Nhà Văn, 2020).
  - l Japanese Translation (pocket edition); translated by Amano Kentaro天野健太郎: 《自転車泥棒》 (東京：文春文庫, 2021).
  - l Thai Translation; translated by รำพรรณ รักศรีอักษร: จักรยานที่หายไป (Pangkok:Biblio, 2021).
  - l Ukrainian Translation; translated by Володимир Селігей: Хроніки поцуплених роверів (Kyiv:SAFRAN, 2021).
  - l Arabian Translation: الدراجة المسروقة (Cairo:AL ARABI PUBLISHING AND DISTRIBUTING, 2022).
  - l Korean Translation: 도난당한 자전거 (Seoul:Gimm-Young publishers, 2023).
- The Sea Breeze Club 《海風酒店》 (Taipei: Initial Publish, 2023)

=== Short story collections ===
- We’re Closed Today 《本日公休》(Taipei: Chiuko, 1997).
- Grandfather Tiger 《虎爺》(Chiuko, 2003).
- The Illusionist on the Skywalk 《天橋上的魔術師》 (Taipei: Summer Festival, 2011).
  - l Simplified Chinese Edition: (北京：新星出版社，2014).
  - l Japanese Translation; translated by Amano Kentaro 天野健太郎: 《歩道橋の魔術師》(東京：白水社，2015).
  - l French Translation; translated by Gwennaël Gaffric (關首奇): Le Magicien sur la passerelle (Paris: L’Asiathèque, 2017).
  - l Korean Translation; translated by 허유영: 《햇빛 어른거리는 길 위의 코끼리》(파주：알마, 2018).
  - l Japanese Translation (pocket edition); translated by Amano Kentaro: 《歩道橋の魔術師》 (東京：河出文庫, 2021).
- The Land of Little Rain 《苦雨之地》 (Taipei: Thinkingdom Media Group Ltd., 2019).
  - l Japanese Translation; translated by Akane Oikawa 及川茜: 《雨の島》 (東京：河出書房新社, 2021).
  - l Catalan Translation; translated by Mireia Vargas Urpí: La terra de la pluja amarga (Barcelona: Chronos Editorial, 2025).

=== Essay collections ===
- The Book of Lost Butterflies 《迷蝶誌》(Taipei: Wheat Field Press, 2000); Reprinted (Taipei: Summer Festival, 2010).
  - l Simplified Chinese Edition: (北京：中國文聯出版社，2014).
  - l Korean Translation; translated by 허유영: 《나비탐미기 》 (Seoul：시루, 2016).
- The Dao of Butterflies 《蝶道》(Taipei: 2-fishes, 2003); 2nd Edition (Taipei: 2-fishes, 2010).
- So Much Water So Close to Home 《家離水邊那麼近》(Taipei: 2-fishes, 2007).
- Above Flame 《浮光》(Taipei: ThinKingDom, 2014).
- Beyond the Blue: Kuroshio’s Voyage《黑潮島航：一群海人的藍色曠野巡禮》(Taipei: Net and Books Publishing, 2019) (Co-wrote with Hui-chun Chang and Kuan-jung Chen).

=== Guidebook ===
- Taipei’s Garden of Eden: Guidebook on the Ecological History of Shilin Official Residence (Taipei: Avanguard Publishing, 2002).

=== Literary Theory ===
- Liberating Nature through Writing 《以書寫解放自然：台灣現代自然書寫的探索》(Taipei: Da’an Press, 2011).
- The Search for Modern Taiwanese Nature Writing 1980-2002：Liberating Nature through Writing, vol 1 《臺灣現代自然書寫的探索 1980-2002：以書寫解放自然 BOOK 1》(Taipei: Summer Festival, 2011); Reprint of Liberating Nature through Writing.
- Essays by Taiwanese Nature Writers 1980-2002: Liberating Nature through Writing, vol. 2 《臺灣自然書寫的作家論 1980-2002：以書寫解放自然 BOOK 2》(Taipei: Summer Festival, 2011).
- The Heart of Nature—From Nature Writing to Ecological Criticism: Liberating Nature through Writing, vol. 3 《自然之心─從自然書寫到生態批評：以書寫解放自然 BOOK 3》(Taipei: Summer Festival, 2011).

=== Edited ===
- Selected Taiwanese Nature Writing 《臺灣自然寫作選》(Taipei: 2-fishes, 2003).
- Wetlands - Petrochemicals - Island Imagination 《溼地．石化．島嶼想像》(Co-edited With Wu Sheng) (Unique Route, 2011).

== Awards and recognition ==
=== Awards ===
Wu’s work has won many notable awards and recognition both at home and abroad, including the first Taiwanese nominee of Man Booker International Prize (2018) and Émile Guimet Prize for Asian Literature (2018). The Man with the Compound Eyes has won the Open Book Award, the Taipei Book Fair Award (Fiction), and the 2014 Prix du Livre Insulaire (Fiction). It was also “selected as one of the Best Chinese Fiction Books of the Last Century” by Time Out Beijing in 2015. The Stolen Bicycle has won the Open Book Award and the Taiwan Literature Award. Upon publication of the English translation, it was longlisted for the Man Booker International Prize in March 2018. The Illusionist on the Skywalk ranked No. 2 in the Japan Twitter Literary Award (Overseas Category) and No. 3 in the Japan Booksellers’ Award (Translated Fiction) in 2016. It was also nominated for the Dream of the Red Chamber Award. In 2018, it was shortlisted for Prix Émile Guimet de littérature asiatique.

=== International ===
- 2007: Routes in the Dream named 10 best books in Chinese on Asia Weekly.
- 2014: The Man with the Compound Eyes won the Prix du livre insulaire in France.
- 2015: The Man with the Compound Eyes named The best Chinese fiction books of the last century on Time Out Beijing.
- 2016: The Magician on the Skywalk ranked second in Overseas category for the Twitter Literature Award in Japan.
- 2016: The Magician on the Skywalk ranked third in Excellent translations category for Japan Booksellers’ Award.
- 2016: The Magician on the Skywalk shortlisted for the Best Translation Award in Japan.
- 2016: The Stolen Bicycle shortlisted for Dream of the Red Chamber Award
- 2018: The Stolen Bicycle nominated for Man Booker International Prize.
- 2018: The Magician on the Skywalk longlisted for Prix Émile Guimet de littérature asiatique.
- 2019: The Stolen Bicycle shortlisted for Japanese Translation Prize.
- 2021: The Man with the Compound Eyes named Books at Berlinale at the Berlinale - Berlin International Film Festival.
- 2022: The Man with the Compound Eyes shortlisted for the 2022 Seiun Awards Nominees
- 2023: The Man with the Compound Eyes translated by Mireia Vargas-Urpí won PEN Català de Traducció 2023
- 2023: The Sea Breeze Club named 10 best books (Novels) in Chinese on Asia Weekly.

=== Domestic ===
- 1989: “Father’s Wooden Ruler” 〈父親的木尺〉 won the National Students Literature Award.
- 1992: “The Last Xiyilieke”〈最後的希以列克〉won the UNITAS Debut New Author Short Story Award.
- 1996: “Traces of the Enemy“ 〈敵蹤〉won the Taiwan Literature Magazine Wang Shixun New Author Award.
- 1998: “Lost Butterflies“ 〈迷蝶〉won the Liang Shiqiu Literary Award.
- 1998: “Flying“ 〈飛〉won the Ecology and Reporting Literature Award.
- 1999: “Eyes“ 〈眼〉won the Central Daily News Literature Award.
- 2000: The Book of Lost Butterflies《迷蝶誌》won the Taipei Literature Award Creativity Award.
- 2000: The Book of Lost Butterflies named one of the ten best books of the year by Central Daily News.
- 2001: “Grandfather Tiger“ 〈虎爺〉won the UDN Literature Award Best Novel.
- 2003: The Dao of Butterflies《蝶道》 won China Times Open Book Award.
- 2003: The Dao of Butterflies named One of the Most Influential Books of the Year on Kingstone Bookstore.
- 2007: So Much Water So Close to Home won China Times Open Book Award.
- 2011: The Man with the Compound Eyes won China Times Open Book Award.
- 2012: The Man with the Compound Eyes won Taipei International Book Exhibition Grand Prize Fiction Award.
- 2012: The Magician on the Skywalk won China Times Open Book Award.
- 2012: The Magician on the Skywalk named Best Book of the Year on Books.com.tw.
- 2014: Miracle (Negative Film) 《美麗世(負片)》 won Chiuko Prose Award.
- 2014: Above Flame won China Times Open Book Award.
- 2014: Above Flame named on Kingstone Bookstore’s Most Influential Books of the Year
- 2015: Above Flame won the Golden Tripod Award.
- 2016: The Stolen Bicycle won the Taiwan Literature Award.
- 2015: The Stolen Bicycle won China Times Open Book Award.
- 2015: Named Taiwan’s most anticipated writer of the year at the 4th Eslite Bookstore Professional Reader Award for The Stolen Bicycle.
- 2015: Shortlisted for Shopping Design, Taiwan Design Best 100.
- 2016: Won the UDN Literature Prize for The Stolen Bicycle, The Magician on the Skywalk, and So Much Water So Close to Home.
- 2018: Nominated as 10 best essayists for Yanfen Region (Salt zone) Literature.
- 2019: Named the Writer of the Year on Kingstone Bookstore.
- 2019: Named The Most Influential Person of the Year by La Vie.
- 2019: The Land of Little Rain named Best Book of the Year on Books.com.tw.
- 2019: The Land of Little Rain named Best Book of the Year by Mirror Media.
- 2019: Named Taiwan’s most anticipated writer of the year at the 4th Eslite Bookstore Professional Reader Award for The Land of Little Rain.
- 2019: Beyond the Blue: Kuroshio’s Voyage 《黑潮導航》 named one of the ten best books by the OPENBOOK – Beautiful Life Category.
- 2023: The Sea Breeze Club won China Times Open Book Award.
- 2023: The Sea Breeze Club named the Best Book of the Year on Books.com.tw.
- 2023: The Sea Breeze Club named the Most Influential Books of the Year on Kingstone Bookstore.
- 2023: The Sea Breeze Club won the Grand Prize for Fiction at the Taiwan Bookstore Award.
