= Chung Ling =

- 鍾玲
- Born: 1945 (age 80–81); Chungking
- Education: Tunghai University (BA); University of Wisconsin–Madison (MA, PhD)
- Occupations: Writer, critic, educator and translator
- Spouse: King Hu

Chung Ling (Chinese: 鍾玲; born 1945) is a Taiwanese writer, critic, educator and translator. Her name also appears as Zhong Ling.^{[1]}

== Early life and education ==
She was born in Chungking in Szechwan province, a native Cantonese and came to Taiwan with her family in 1950 from Japan. Zhong was educated at a girls' school in Kaohsiung, at Tunghai University and at the University of Wisconsin at Madison.^{[2]}

== Career ==
She taught at State University of New York at Albany, at Hong Kong University at National Sun Yat-sen University in Taiwan, where she became Dean of Liberal Arts, Hong Kong Baptist University where she served as chair professor, Dean of Arts and Associate Vice President, and in University of Macau where she became the founding Master of Cheng Yu Tung College.^{[3]} In Baptist University she founded the International Workshop and The Dream of Red Chamber Award: World's Distinguished Novel in Chinese. In 1977, she married director Hu Jinquan; the couple divorced in 1991.^{[1]} Zhong has edited and translated collections of Chinese poetry into English, such as Orchid Boat: Women Poets of China (1972) with Kenneth Rexroth.^{[2]}

During her marriage to Hu Jinquan, she wrote a screenplay for his film, Legend of the Mountain.^{[1]}

== Selected works ==
- Chʻih tsu tsai tsʻao ti shang (Barefoot on the Meadow), prose (1970)
- Qunshan huhuan wo (The Mountains Are Calling Me), prose & verse (1981)
- Shengsi yuanjia (Predestined Lovers), short stories (1992)
- Ruyu: Aiyude gushi (Jade-Like: Stories of Jade), prose (1993)
- Yuyuan: Guyu yu haoyuan (Karma of Jade: Antique Jade), prose(1993)
- Fenfang de hai (Fragrant Sea), poetry (1989)
- Xiandai zhongguo miusi:Taiwan nvshiren zuopin xilun (Muses of Modern China: A Critical Study on the Works of Taiwan Women Poets), literary criticism (1989)
- Shinaide yu zhongguo wenhua (Gary Snyder and Chinese Culture), literary criticism (2006)
- Zhongguochan yu meiguo wenxue (Chinese Zen and American Literature), literary criticism (2009)
- Wuzai dengshan (Fog Is Climbing Mountains), poetry (2010)
- Tianyan hongchen (Eye of Heaven and Red Dust), short stories (2011)
- Zhongling jiduanpian (Miniature Short Stories of Chung Ling), short stories(2012) [i]

== Sources ==
- Ho, Clara Wing-chung Ho (2003). Biographical Dictionary of Chinese Women. Volume 2. pp. 116–17. ISBN 0765607980.
- Lin, Julia C (2014). Twentieth-century Chinese Women's Poetry: An Anthology. p. 166. ISBN 1317453204.
- Cheng Yu Tung College, University of Macau: http://cytc.rc.umac.mo/academics/
