= Newman Prize for Chinese Literature =

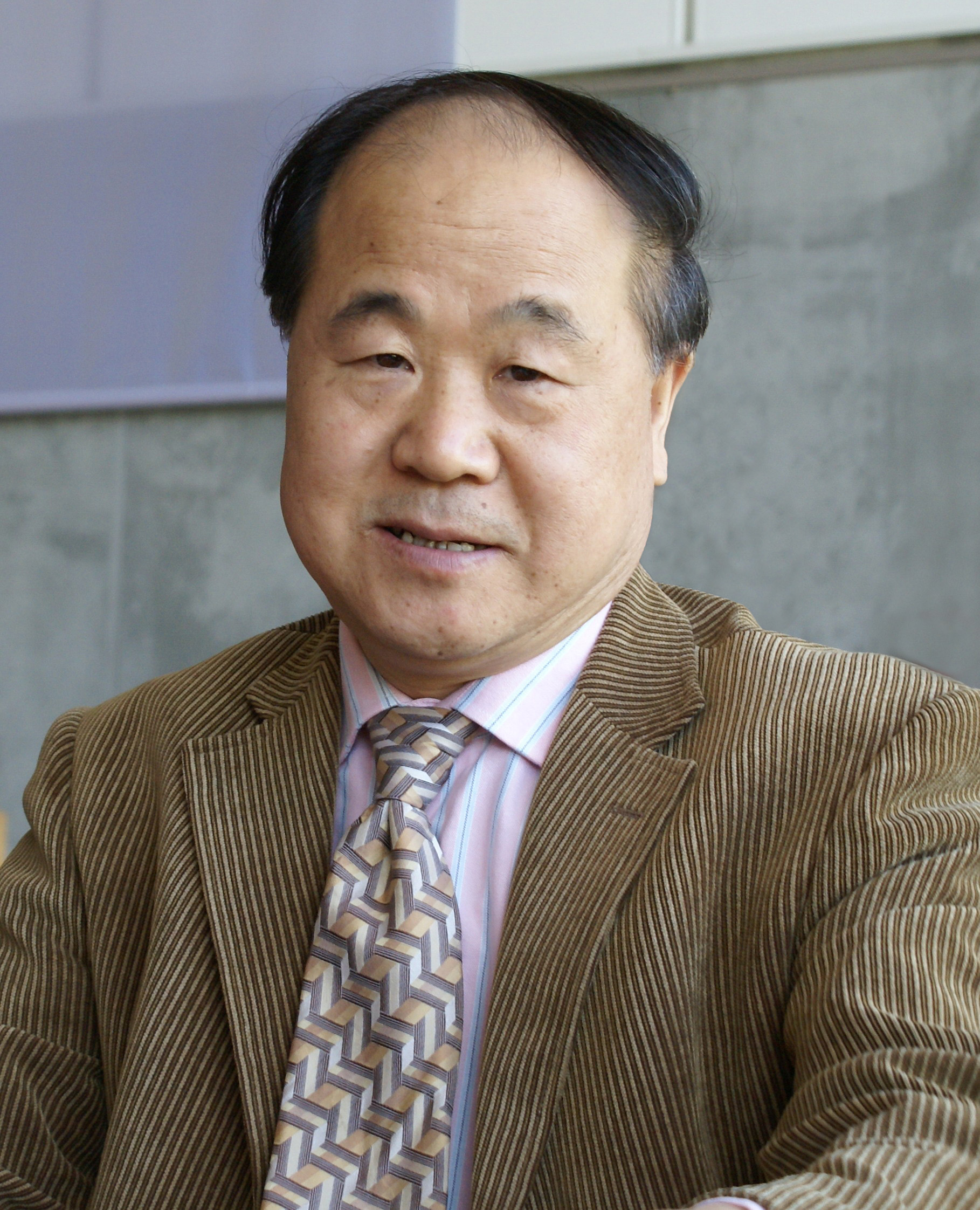
- Inaugural winner Mo Yan
- Country: United States of America
- Presented by: University of Oklahoma
- Reward: $10,000
- First award: 2009
- Website: https://www.ou.edu/cis/research/institute-for-us-china-issues/us-china-cultural-issues/newman-prize-for-chinese-literature

The Newman Prize for Chinese Literature was established in 2008 by Peter Gries, director of the Institute for US-China Issues at the University of Oklahoma (OU). The Newman Prize is awarded every two years. The winner is selected based on literary merit; any living author writing in Chinese is eligible for a recommendation. The Prize honors Harold J. Newman and Ruth Newman, who enabled the establishment of the OU Institute for US-China Issues.

== Nominations, ceremony, and voting ==
Nominations for candidates and the selection of the winner are both handled by an international jury of what OU describes as "distinguished experts." The winner is awarded $10,000 and a plaque, and is invited to the University of Oklahoma to participate in an award ceremony and academic activities.

Voting takes place in successive rounds of “positive” elimination, in which jurors vote for all but one of the candidates at each stage. The Director of the OU Institute for US-China Issues counts the ballots to record each round of votes. The jury will continue voting until it narrows to one candidate, the winner. If there are ties for elimination in any but the final two rounds, the tied candidates will both be eliminated. Once three candidates remain, only one can be eliminated at a time.

== Winners and nominees ==
| Year | Judging panel | Author | Work |
|---|---|---|---|
1st 2009
| 1st 2009 | Howard Goldblatt; Kirk Denton; Liu Hongtao; Xu Zidong; Peng Hsiao-yen; Zhang Yiwu; Zhao Yiheng | | |
| 1st 2009 | Howard Goldblatt; Kirk Denton; Liu Hongtao; Xu Zidong; Peng Hsiao-yen; Zhang Yiwu; Zhao Yiheng | Mo Yan | Life and Death Are Wearing Me Out (生死疲劳) |
| 1st 2009 | Howard Goldblatt; Kirk Denton; Liu Hongtao; Xu Zidong; Peng Hsiao-yen; Zhang Yiwu; Zhao Yiheng | Yan Lianke | Dream of Ding Village (丁庄梦) |
| 1st 2009 | Howard Goldblatt; Kirk Denton; Liu Hongtao; Xu Zidong; Peng Hsiao-yen; Zhang Yiwu; Zhao Yiheng | Jin Yong | The Deer and the Cauldron (鹿鼎记) |
| 1st 2009 | Howard Goldblatt; Kirk Denton; Liu Hongtao; Xu Zidong; Peng Hsiao-yen; Zhang Yiwu; Zhao Yiheng | Wang Anyi | The Song of Everlasting Sorrow (长恨歌) |
| 1st 2009 | Howard Goldblatt; Kirk Denton; Liu Hongtao; Xu Zidong; Peng Hsiao-yen; Zhang Yiwu; Zhao Yiheng | Chu T’ien-hsin | The Old Capital (古都) |
| 1st 2009 | Howard Goldblatt; Kirk Denton; Liu Hongtao; Xu Zidong; Peng Hsiao-yen; Zhang Yiwu; Zhao Yiheng | Wang Meng | The Transformer (活动变人形) |
| 1st 2009 | Howard Goldblatt; Kirk Denton; Liu Hongtao; Xu Zidong; Peng Hsiao-yen; Zhang Yiwu; Zhao Yiheng | Ning Ken | The City of Masks (蒙面之城) |
2nd 2011
| 2nd 2011 | Julia Lovell; Tom Moran; Liang-ya Liou; Ann Huss; Ji Jin | | |
| 2nd 2011 | Julia Lovell; Tom Moran; Liang-ya Liou; Ann Huss; Ji Jin | Han Shaogong | A Dictionary of Maqiao (马桥词典) |
| 2nd 2011 | Julia Lovell; Tom Moran; Liang-ya Liou; Ann Huss; Ji Jin | Yu Hua | Chronicle of a Blood Merchant (许三观卖血记) |
| 2nd 2011 | Julia Lovell; Tom Moran; Liang-ya Liou; Ann Huss; Ji Jin | Li Ang | The Lost Garden (迷園) |
| 2nd 2011 | Julia Lovell; Tom Moran; Liang-ya Liou; Ann Huss; Ji Jin | Ge Fei | Peach Blossom Beauty (人面桃花) |
| 2nd 2011 | Julia Lovell; Tom Moran; Liang-ya Liou; Ann Huss; Ji Jin | Su Tong | The Boat to Redemption (河岸) |
3rd 2013 (Poetry Year)
| 3rd 2013 (Poetry Year) | Michelle Yeh; Jennifer Feeley; Michel Hockx; Wolfgang Kubin; Zhang Qinghua | | |
| 3rd 2013 (Poetry Year) | Michelle Yeh; Jennifer Feeley; Michel Hockx; Wolfgang Kubin; Zhang Qinghua | Yang Mu | Diaspsis Patelliformi (介殼蟲) |
| 3rd 2013 (Poetry Year) | Michelle Yeh; Jennifer Feeley; Michel Hockx; Wolfgang Kubin; Zhang Qinghua | Hsia Yu | |
| 3rd 2013 (Poetry Year) | Michelle Yeh; Jennifer Feeley; Michel Hockx; Wolfgang Kubin; Zhang Qinghua | Yang Lian | |
| 3rd 2013 (Poetry Year) | Michelle Yeh; Jennifer Feeley; Michel Hockx; Wolfgang Kubin; Zhang Qinghua | Zhai Yongming | |
| 3rd 2013 (Poetry Year) | Michelle Yeh; Jennifer Feeley; Michel Hockx; Wolfgang Kubin; Zhang Qinghua | Ouyang Jianghe | |
4th 2015
| 4th 2015 | Margaret Hillenbrand; Carlos Rojas; Zhang Ning; Charles Laughlin; Shu-mei Shi | | |
| 4th 2015 | Margaret Hillenbrand; Carlos Rojas; Zhang Ning; Charles Laughlin; Shu-mei Shi | Chu T’ien-wen | Fin-de-Siècle Splendor (世紀末的華麗) |
| 4th 2015 | Margaret Hillenbrand; Carlos Rojas; Zhang Ning; Charles Laughlin; Shu-mei Shi | Yan Lianke | Lenin’s Kisses (受活) |
| 4th 2015 | Margaret Hillenbrand; Carlos Rojas; Zhang Ning; Charles Laughlin; Shu-mei Shi | Yu Hua | The Seventh Day (第七天) |
| 4th 2015 | Margaret Hillenbrand; Carlos Rojas; Zhang Ning; Charles Laughlin; Shu-mei Shi | Ge Fei | Peach Blossom Beauty (人面桃花) |
| 4th 2015 | Margaret Hillenbrand; Carlos Rojas; Zhang Ning; Charles Laughlin; Shu-mei Shi | Chang Kui-hsing | The Herd of Elephants (群象) |
5th 2017
| 5th 2017 | Dai Jinhua; Wendy Larson; Ban Wang; Letty Chen; Jianmei Liu | | |
| 5th 2017 | Dai Jinhua; Wendy Larson; Ban Wang; Letty Chen; Jianmei Liu | Wang Anyi | Reality and Fiction (纪实与虚构) |
| 5th 2017 | Dai Jinhua; Wendy Larson; Ban Wang; Letty Chen; Jianmei Liu | Yu Hua | Leaving Home at Eighteen (十八岁出门远行) |
| 5th 2017 | Dai Jinhua; Wendy Larson; Ban Wang; Letty Chen; Jianmei Liu | Jia Pingwa | Ruined City (废都) |
| 5th 2017 | Dai Jinhua; Wendy Larson; Ban Wang; Letty Chen; Jianmei Liu | Wu He | Remains of Life (餘生) |
| 5th 2017 | Dai Jinhua; Wendy Larson; Ban Wang; Letty Chen; Jianmei Liu | Yan Lianke | Lenin's Kisses (受活) |
6th 2019
| 6th 2019 | Tammy Ho Lai-Ming; Nick Admussen; Eleanor Goodman; Christopher Lupke; Maghiel van Crevel; Wang Guangming | | |
| 6th 2019 | Tammy Ho Lai-Ming; Nick Admussen; Eleanor Goodman; Christopher Lupke; Maghiel van Crevel; Wang Guangming | Xi Xi | |
| 6th 2019 | Tammy Ho Lai-Ming; Nick Admussen; Eleanor Goodman; Christopher Lupke; Maghiel van Crevel; Wang Guangming | Yu Xiuhua | |
| 6th 2019 | Tammy Ho Lai-Ming; Nick Admussen; Eleanor Goodman; Christopher Lupke; Maghiel van Crevel; Wang Guangming | Wang Xiaoni | |
| 6th 2019 | Tammy Ho Lai-Ming; Nick Admussen; Eleanor Goodman; Christopher Lupke; Maghiel van Crevel; Wang Guangming | Xiao Kaiyu | |
| 6th 2019 | Tammy Ho Lai-Ming; Nick Admussen; Eleanor Goodman; Christopher Lupke; Maghiel van Crevel; Wang Guangming | Zheng Xiaoqiong | |
| 6th 2019 | Tammy Ho Lai-Ming; Nick Admussen; Eleanor Goodman; Christopher Lupke; Maghiel van Crevel; Wang Guangming | Bei Dao | |
7th 2021
| 7th 2021 | Eric Abrahamsen; Andrea Bachner; Yunte Huang; Chen Xiaoming; Eileen Chow | | |
| 7th 2021 | Eric Abrahamsen; Andrea Bachner; Yunte Huang; Chen Xiaoming; Eileen Chow | Yan Lianke | |
| 7th 2021 | Eric Abrahamsen; Andrea Bachner; Yunte Huang; Chen Xiaoming; Eileen Chow | Wu He | |
| 7th 2021 | Eric Abrahamsen; Andrea Bachner; Yunte Huang; Chen Xiaoming; Eileen Chow | Su Tong | |
| 7th 2021 | Eric Abrahamsen; Andrea Bachner; Yunte Huang; Chen Xiaoming; Eileen Chow | Xu Xiaobin | |
| 7th 2021 | Eric Abrahamsen; Andrea Bachner; Yunte Huang; Chen Xiaoming; Eileen Chow | Lung Yingtai | |
8th 2023
| 8th 2023 | E.K. Tan; Frances Weightman; Ou Ning; Sabina Knight; He Ping | | |
| 8th 2023 | E.K. Tan; Frances Weightman; Ou Ning; Sabina Knight; He Ping | Chang Kuei-hsing | |
| 8th 2023 | E.K. Tan; Frances Weightman; Ou Ning; Sabina Knight; He Ping | Dorothy Tse | |
| 8th 2023 | E.K. Tan; Frances Weightman; Ou Ning; Sabina Knight; He Ping | Zhou Kai | |
| 8th 2023 | E.K. Tan; Frances Weightman; Ou Ning; Sabina Knight; He Ping | Yu Hua | |
| 8th 2023 | E.K. Tan; Frances Weightman; Ou Ning; Sabina Knight; He Ping | Bi Feiyu | |
9th 2025
| 9th 2025 | | Ling Yü (Wang Meiqin ) | Daughters |
| 9th 2025 | | Zheng Xiaoqiong | |
| 9th 2025 | | Yam Gong | |
| 9th 2025 | | Ouyang Jianghe | |
| 9th 2025 | | Bai Hua | |
| 10th 2027 | | | |
| 10th 2027 | | Fang Fang | |
| 10th 2027 | | Su Tong | |
| 10th 2027 | | Wu Ming-yi | |
| 10th 2027 | | priest | |
| 10th 2027 | | Zhang Yueran | |

== See also ==
- University of Oklahoma
- World literature
- World Literature Today
- Chinese Literature Today
- Neustadt International Prize for Literature.
