= Serve the People (disambiguation) =

Serve the People is a political slogan used by the Chinese Communist Party.

Serve the People may refer to:

- Serve the People (Norway), a Norwegian communist organization
- Serve the People!, a 2005 novel by Yan Lianke
- Serve the People (film), a 2022 South Korean romantic drama film

== See also ==
- Servant of the People (disambiguation)
