= Carlos Rojas (sinologist) =

American sinologist and translator (born 1970)

Carlos Rojas (born 1970 in Atlanta, Georgia) is an American sinologist and translator. He is currently Professor of Asian and Middle Eastern Studies at Duke University's Trinity College of Arts & Sciences. He is a cultural historian and his work and teachings primarily focus on Chinese culture. He also teaches the subjects of film, gender, sexuality, and feminist studies. He received a B.A. from Cornell University in 1995 and a Ph.D. from Columbia University in 2000. Before his professorship at Duke, Rojas was assistant professor of Modern Chinese Literature and Film at the University of Florida. Rojas lives in Durham, North Carolina.

== Career ==
Carlos Rojas and Eileen Cheng-yin Chow translated Yu Hua's novel Brothers. Their translation was shortlisted for the 2008 Man Asian Literary Prize. Rojas has also translated several books by Chinese novelist and short story writer Yan Lianke. His translation of Yan Lianke's The Four Books was shortlisted for the 2016 Man Booker International Prize. Isabel Hilton of The Observer called it "impeccably" translated. His translation of Yan Lianke's The Explosion Chronicles was longlisted for the 2017 Man Booker International Prize, the 2017 Pen Translation Prize, and the 2017 National Translation Award in Prose. The Economist praised Rojas' "robust and well-paced translation". The Guardian called his translation a "model of clarity".

Rojas served on the jury of the 2015 Newman Prize for Chinese Literature and the 2020 Dream of the Red Chamber Award.

In 2010, Rojas published The Great Wall: A Cultural History through Harvard University Press. The book is a survey of the Great Wall of China and its function and significance. In it, Rojas examines allusions to the Wall from various historical texts and cultural works.

== Selected bibliography ==
=== Books ===
- Rojas, Carlos (2008). The Naked Gaze: Reflections on Chinese Modernity. Harvard University Asia Center.
- Rojas, Carlos (2010). The Great Wall: A Cultural History. Harvard University Press.
- Rojas, Carlos (2015). Homesickness: Culture, Contagion, and National Transformation in Modern China. Harvard University Press.

==== Translations ====
- Yu, Hua (2009). Brothers: A Novel. Translated by Rojas, Carlos; Chow, Eileen Cheng-Yin. Pantheon Books.
- Yan, Lianke (2012). Lenin's Kisses: A Novel. Translated by Rojas, Carlos. Grove/Atlantic Press.
- Yan, Lianke (2015). The Four Books: A Novel. Translated by Rojas, Carlos. Grove/Atlantic Press.
- Yan, Lianke (2015). Marrow: A Novella. Translated by Rojas, Carlos. Penguin/Random House.
- Yan, Lianke (2016). The Explosion Chronicles: A Novel. Translated by Rojas, Carlos. Grove Atlantic Press.
- Ng, Kim Chew (2016). Slow Boat to China and Other Stories. Translated by Rojas, Carlos. Columbia University Press.
- Jia, Pingwa (2017). The Lantern Bearer: A Novel. Translated by Rojas, Carlos. CN Times Books.
- Yan, Lianke (2017). The Years, Months, Days: A Novella. Translated by Rojas, Carlos. The Text Publishing Company.
- Yan, Lianke (2017). The Years, Months, Days: Two Novellas. Translated by Rojas, Carlos. Grove/Atlantic Press.
- Yan, Lianke (2018). The Day the Sun Died. Translated by Rojas, Carlos. Grove/Atlantic Press.
- Yan, Lianke (2020). Three Brothers: Memories of My Family. Translated by Rojas, Carlos. Grove/Atlantic Press.
- Yan, Lianke (2020). Hard Like Water. Translated by Rojas, Carlos. Grove/Atlantic Press.

==== As editor ====
- Wang, David Der-wei; Rojas, Carlos, eds. (2007). Writing Taiwan: A New Literary History. Duke University Press.
- Rojas, Carlos; Chow, Eileen Cheng-yin, eds. (2009). Rethinking Chinese Popular Culture: Cannibalizations of the Canon. Routledge.
- Rojas, Carlos; Chow, Eileen Cheng-yin, eds. (2013). The Oxford Handbook of Chinese Cinemas. Oxford University Press.
- Rojas, Carlos; Bachner, Andrea, eds. (2016). The Oxford Handbook of Modern Chinese Literatures. Oxford University Press.
- Rojas, Carlos; Litzinger, Ralph A., eds. (2016). Ghost Protocol Development and Displacement in Global China. Duke University Press.
- Chen, Jianhua (2018). Rojas, Carlos (ed.). Revolution and Form: The Development of Modernity in Mao Dun's Early Fiction, 1927–1930. Brill.
- Rojas, Carlos; Sung, Meihwa, eds. (2020). Imagining Communities: Reading Contemporary China Against the Grain. Routledge.

=== Academic articles ===
- Rojas, Carlos (October 2016). "Language, ethnicity, and the politics of literary taxonomy: Ng Kim Chew and Mahua literature". Publications of the Modern Language Association of America. 131 (5): 1316–1327. doi:10.1632/pmla.2016.131.5.1316. S2CID 151523919.
- Rojas, Carlos (March 2018). "A World Republic of Southern [Sinophone] Letters". Modern Chinese Literature and Culture. 30 (1): 42–62.
