= Jia (surname) =

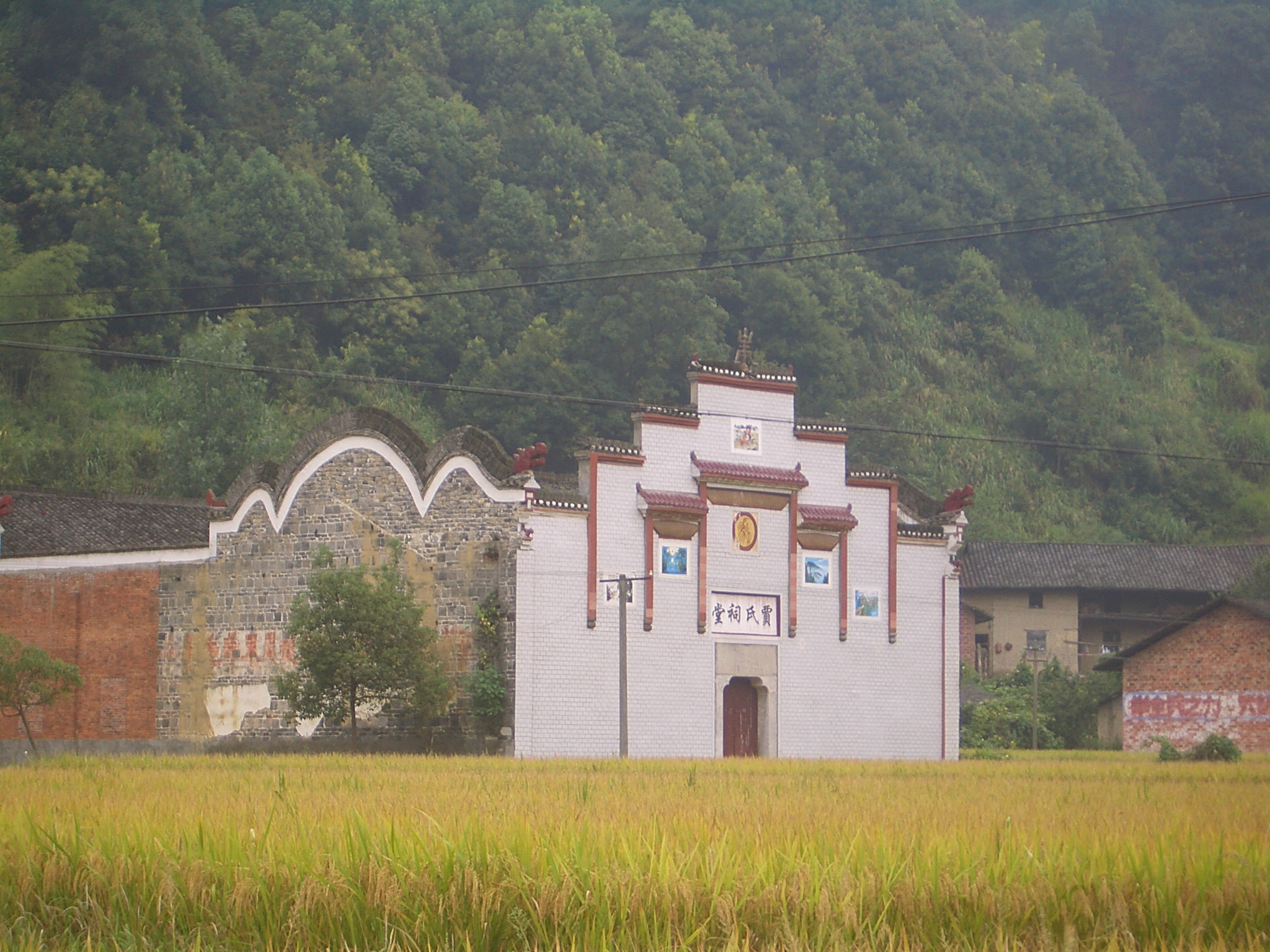
The ancestral hall of the Jia family in Jiajiayuan Village, Honggang Town, Tongshan County, Hubei

Jiǎ (simplified Chinese: 贾; traditional Chinese: 賈) is a surname. Chia is the corresponding Wade-Giles romanization, which is commonly used in Taiwan. Ka is the corresponding Cantonese-based romanization, which is used in Hong Kong and other Cantonese-speaking regions.

== Notable people with Jia as a surname ==
=== Historical figures ===
- Jia Yi (賈誼; 200–169 BCE), official of the Han dynasty
- Jia Kui (scholar) (賈逵; 30–101), scholar and astronomer of the Eastern Han dynasty
- Jia Xu (賈詡; 147–223), official of the Cao Wei state
- Jia Kui (general) (賈逵; 174–228), general of Cao Wei state
  - Jia Chong (賈充; 217–282), general of the Jin dynasty
  - Jia Nanfeng (賈南風; 257–300), empress of the Jin dynasty
- Huiyuan (慧遠; 334–416), Buddhist teacher of the Jin dynasty
- Jia Dan (賈耽; 730–805), official of the Tang dynasty
- Jia Dao (賈島; 779–843), poet of the Tang dynasty
- Jia Su (賈餗; died 835), official of the Tang dynasty
- Jia Xian (贾宪; 1010–1070), mathematician of the Song dynasty
- Jia Sidao (賈似道; 1213–1275), grand chancellor of the Southern Song dynasty under Emperor Lizong

=== Film and television ===
- Jia Zhangke (贾樟柯; born 1970), Chinese film director
- Jia Hongsheng (贾宏声; 1967–2010), Chinese actor
- Alyssa Chia (賈靜雯; born 1974), Taiwanese actress
- JJ Jia (賈曉晨; born 1982), Chinese actress
- Jia Nailiang (贾乃亮; 賈乃亮; born 1984), Chinese actor

=== Government and politics ===
- Chia Ching-teh (1880–1960), President of the Republic of China Examination Yuan (1952–1954)
- Jia Deyao (賈德耀; 1880–1940), Republic of China general and politician
- Jia Zhijie (贾志杰; born 1935), Chinese politician, governor of Gansu and Hubei
- Jia Chunwang (贾春旺; born 1938), Chinese official of the Supreme People's Procurator
- Jia Qinglin (贾庆林; born 1940), Chinese politician, member of the Politburo Standing Committee
- Jia Zhibang (贾治邦; born 1946), Chinese official of the State Forestry Administration
- Jia Yongsheng (贾永生; born 1947), People's Liberation Army Air Force general
- Jia Ting'an (贾廷安; born 1952), People's Liberation Army General Political Department general
- Jia Gaojian (贾高建; born 1959), Chinese official of the Central Compilation and Translation Bureau

=== Sport ===
- Jia Lianren (1912–?), Chinese middle-distance runner
- Jia Xiuquan (贾秀全; born 1963), Chinese football manager
- Jia Guihua (born 1964), Chinese fencer
- Jia Zhanbo (贾占波; born 1974), Chinese sport shooter
- Jia Wenpeng (贾文鹏; born 1978), Chinese football midfielder
- Jia Xiaozhong (贾孝忠; born 1980), Chinese basketball player
- Jia Yunbing (born 1981), Chinese judo practitioner
- Jia Dandan (贾丹丹; born 1982), Chinese ice hockey player
- Jia Yubing (贾昱冰; born 1983), Chinese baseball player
- Jia Delong (贾德龙; born 1985), Chinese baseball player
- Jia Juntingxian (born 1986), Chinese Paralympic sprinter
- Jia Yuping (born 1986), Chinese cross-country skier
- Jia Tong (贾童; born 1991), Chinese diver
- Jia Zongyang (贾宗洋; born 1991), Chinese aerial skier
- Jia Tianzi (贾天子; born 1994), Chinese football midfielder
- Jia Yifan (贾一凡; born 1997), Chinese badminton player

=== Other ===
- Jia Lanpo (贾兰坡; 1908–2001), Chinese archaeologist
- Jia Pingwa (贾平娃; born 1952), Chinese writer
- Jia Yueting (贾跃亭; born 1973), Chinese businessman, founder of Le.com
- Jia Ling (贾玲; born 1982), Chinese xiangsheng performer
- Jia Shu (贾舒; born 1982), Chinese American biomedical engineer
- Jia Jinglong (贾敬龙; 1986–2016), Chinese protester, executed for murder
- Jia Hongguang (born 1988), Chinese Paralympic swimmer
- Jia Junpeng (贾君鹏), Chinese man whose name became associated with a 2009 internet meme
- Jia Rongqing (贾荣庆; fl. 1968–present), Chinese-born Canadian mathematician
- Jia Ruhan (贾茹涵), Chinese soprano
- Xiaohua Jia, Chinese electrical engineer

== Fictional characters ==
Characters in Dream of the Red Chamber:

- Jia Baoyu (賈寶玉), principal character
- Jia Xichun (賈惜春), third cousin of Jia Baoyu
- Jia Tanchun (賈探春), half-sister of Jia Baoyu
- Jia Qiaojie (賈巧姐), daughter of Jia Lian
