= Rixi =

Rixi may refer to:

- Rixi Markus (1910–1992), Austrian/British bridge player
- Edoardo Rixi (born 1974), Italian politician
- The Day the Sun Died (pinyin: Rìxī), a 2015 novel by Yan Lianke
