= Serve the People (film) =

2022 South Korean romantic drama film

- Official release poster
- Hangul: 인민을 위해 복무하라
- Hanja: 人民을 위해 服務하라
- RR: Inmineul wihae bongmuhara
- MR: Inminŭl wihae pongmuhara
- Directed by: Jang Cheol-soo
- Screenplay by: Jang Cheol-soo
- Based on: Serve the People! by Yan Lianke
- Produced by: Park Jin-seong
- Starring: Yeon Woo-jin; Ji An; Jo Sung-ha; Kim Ji-chul
- Cinematography: Kim Gu-young
- Edited by: Lee Do-hyun
- Production companies: Leopard Film Company; Joy N Cinema
- Distributed by: JNC Media Group
- Release date: February 23, 2022
- Running time: 146 minutes
- Country: South Korea
- Language: Korean
- Box office: est. US$562,357

Serve the People (Korean: 인민을 위해 복무하라) is a 2022 South Korean romantic drama film, written and directed by Jang Cheol-soo and starring Yeon Woo-jin, Ji An (지안), Jo Sung-ha and Kim Ji-chul. Based on the eponymous novel by Chinese writer Yan Lianke, it depicts a romance between Mu Gwang, a model soldier, and Su-ryun, the young wife of the division commander and the inner conflicts of Mu Gwang. The film set in a fictional socialist country much similar to North Korea in the 1970s, was released theatrically on February 23, 2022 in South Korea.

== Synopsis ==
Explaining the meaning of title the director of the film said, "The supreme leader has given the soldier the duty written on the sign to serve the people, and the ear of barley engraved next to it symbolizes a bountiful harvest and the red star symbolizes a brilliant future. The division commander values this sign more than life. And he said the same to Mu-gwang, the first to go to work. Su-ryun uses this sign to create rifts and widen the gaps. The language of revolution is replaced by the language of desire. It becomes a medium of love."

== Cast ==
- Yeon Woo-jin as Mu-gwang
- Ji An as Soo-ryeon
- Jo Sung-ha as Division commander
- Kim Ji-chul as Company commander
- Park Jung-eon as Instructor's wife
- Woo Ju-bin as Veteran soldier
- Han Min-yeop as Driver
- Jang Hae-min as Mu-gwang's wife
- Han Il-gyu as battalion commander

== Production ==
In July 2013, the film was planned based on the novel Serve the People! by the Chinese novelist Yan Lianke. Director Jang Cheol-soo was assigned direction of the film and Yeon Woo-jin was offered the lead role of a soldier, who while struggling between class differences and sexual desire, succumbs to the temptation of his boss's wife.

In an interview the lead actor Yeon Woo-jin said that he had read the script back in 2014, but the filming began in 2020. In September 2020, it was reported that Yeon Woo-jin and Jian has been cast in the film Serve the People directed by Jang Cheol-soo and produced by Leopard Film Company. Serve the People is a comeback film of Ji An, who is appearing after 5 years. Her last film was The Way in 2017.

== Reception ==
=== Box office ===
The film was released on 595 screens on February 23, 2022. On the opening day the film ranked at number 4 on the Korean box office.

As of May 19, 2022 it is at 15th place among all the Korean films released in the year 2022, with gross of US$562,357 and 74,138 admissions.

=== Critical response ===
Kim Mi-hwa of Star News criticized the presentation of the film, writing, "The content of satire and resistance to the original system was not well expressed in the film". She further stated that the depiction of sex scenes "continues for a long time" and "the subject matter this film was trying to talk about in the first place becomes more and more distant." Kim found the character Soo-Ryun, played by actress Ji-An, "disappointing" as "it feels hard and awkward without knowing where it is". Concluding her review Kim opined, "Serving the People seems to be difficult to leave behind more than a problematic work."

Yang Yu-jin of My Daily in her review, termed the film as "A problematic work that shakes emotions by going back and forth between reason and instinct seeks the audience." She praised the performances of lead pair writing, "Yeon Woo-jin and Ji-an's challenging spirit stand out." Yang further stated, "in particular, Yeon Woo-jin's acting transformation is impressive." Concluding Yang wrote, that the film conveyed the impression that the heavy theme of anti-socialism has been somewhat volatilized, and it is only a description of exceptional 19-karat gold [sex scenes]."

Lee Bora of Cine21 reviewing the film stated that the endeavour was made to show the setting of the film in fiction world "with imagination added based on the tone of the characters and the overall mise-en-scène." Bora opined, that the conflict between the protagonists, "who go back and forth between reality and desire, is produced very stiffly". Bora felt that the narrative of the film was not tightly woven, it felt "as if a screw is missing". Bora concluded, "the focus of [the film] is on sexuality rather than love.
