= Lenin's Kisses =

2004 novel by Yan Lianke

Lenin's Kisses (Chinese: 受活; pinyin: Shòu huó) is a novel by the Chinese writer Yan Lianke, published in 2004.

== Plot ==
The story is set in an isolated village where the economy failed to improve during either the Mao-era or after Reform and Opening Up.

A freak mid-summer blizzard that begins the novel sets into motion initiatives to improve the village's economic development. Inspired by the trend of red tourism, a local cadre develops a plan to buy the preserved corpse of Vladimir Lenin to build a memorial hall and make the village a tourist destination (in the novel, the post-USSR Russian state has cut off financial support for Lenin's Mausoleum). The village collects funds for buying the preserved corpse and to build a monument around it. To do so, the village organizes a touring performing troupe of an all-handicapped ensemble. The profits of the project consumes the village and the solidarity of its citizens. The chief of the district is able to make grand constructions, until his superiors find out what is happening.

== Themes ==
"That the dead body of socialism's most important role model is being commercialized, can serve as an illustration of the hypercapitalism of contemporary China", according to Klassekampen. Academic Hang Tu writes that the novel illustrates the desacralizing effect of market logic in China.

== Translated publications ==
- English: Lenin's Kisses (2013, by Carlos Rojas)
- French: Bons baisers de Lénine (2009, by Sylvie Gentil)
- Norwegian: Lenins kyss (2011 - from French, by Tom Lotherington)
- Swedish: Lenins kyssar (2015, by Anna Gustafsson Chen)
