= Serve the People! =

2005 novel by Yan Lianke

- Simplified Chinese: 为人民服务
- Traditional Chinese: 為人民服務
Transcriptions
Standard Mandarin
- Hanyu Pinyin: Wèirénmínfúwù

Serve the People! (Chinese: 为人民服务) is a 2005 novel by Yan Lianke. The English version, translated by Julia Lovell, was published in 2008 by Black Cat/Grove. The book has been banned in China for allegedly slandering Mao Zedong.

== Plot ==
Set during the Cultural Revolution, at the peak of the cult of personality of Chairman Mao, the novel tells the story of an affair between the Liu Lian, the wife of a powerful military commander, and a young peasant soldier, Wu Dawang. Liu tells Wu that whenever she removes the household's wooden 'Serve the People!' sign from its usual place in her dining room, they should meet for sex.

During one sexual encounter, We accidentally knocks down and tramples a sign with another Mao slogan. Their initial dismay is then sublimated into erotic desire and they engage in passionate sex. Not long after, they engage in three days of sex during which they seek other Mao items to destroy.

Liu reveals to Wu that she is pregnant and arranges for him to take a leave of absence to his hometown. When he returns, he finds that the military base has been dismantled and everyone who knew of his relationship with Liu has been transferred elsewhere. We realizes that the relationship has been a set-up to enable Liu to become pregnant with a child she and her husband could treat as their own.

The title is a reference to a phrase originally coined by Mao in a 1944 article of the same name that commemorated the death of the red army soldier Zhang Side. During the Cultural Revolution, this article was required reading for millions of Chinese, and the slogan was widely used.

== Reception ==
Due to the sex scenes and sensitive political content, the story attracted controversy in China when it was featured the literary magazine Huacheng in 2005. The novel was transgressive because its sex scenes incorporated Mao Zedong imagery and slogans. The Chinese government ordered the publisher to recall all 40,000 copies of the magazine, which in turn created huge demand for the novel. The novel was banned by the Chinese government. The Propaganda Department of the Chinese Communist Party concluded that the novel "slandered Mao Zedong, slandered the lofty purpose of Mao Zedong's 'Serve the People', slandered the people's army, slandered the revolution and politics" and contained "excessive descriptions of sex" and "spread mistaken Western views."

Since its banning, the book continued to be widely available on the internet in China.

The novel drew criticism from socialist realist writers in China who objected to its satire and what they deemed its scandalous depictions.

An English translation was published in 2008 by Grove. It has also been translated into French, Danish, Norwegian, German, Dutch, Italian, Czech, Romanian and English.

Yan writes that he does not consider Serve the People! to be one of his most significant works.

== Adaptation ==
The screenwriter and director Jang Cheol-soo adapted the story to set the erotic South Korean film, Serve the People, in a fictional socialist country with similarity to North Korea in the 1970s. Filming of the movie began in 2020 and it was released theatrically on February 23, 2022.
