= Yan Lianke =

Chinese novelist and satirist (born 1958)

- 阎连科
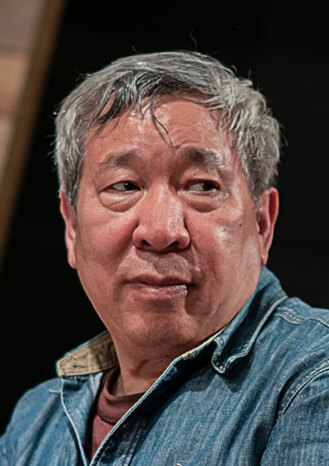
- Yan Lianke in 2024
- Born: August 24, 1958 (age 68); Henan, China
- Education: Henan University; People's Literature Army Arts College
- Occupation: Writer
- Spouse: Zhai Lisha
- Children: Yan Songwei
- Writing career
- Period: 1980–present
- Genres: Fiction, prose, script, literacy theory
- Notable awards: Lu Xun Literary Prize, Franz Kafka Prize

Yan Lianke
- Traditional Chinese: 閻連科
- Simplified Chinese: 阎连科
Transcriptions
Standard Mandarin
- Hanyu Pinyin: Yán Liánkē
- Wade–Giles: Yen Lien-k'o

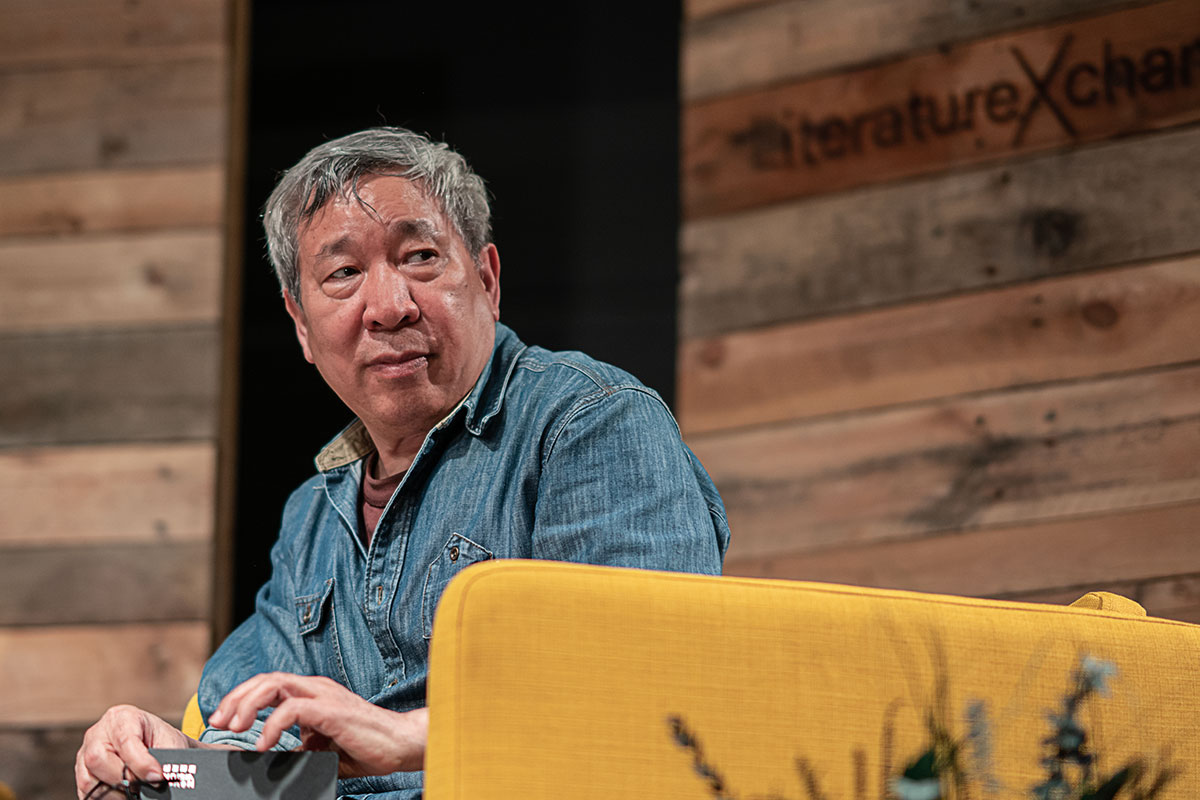
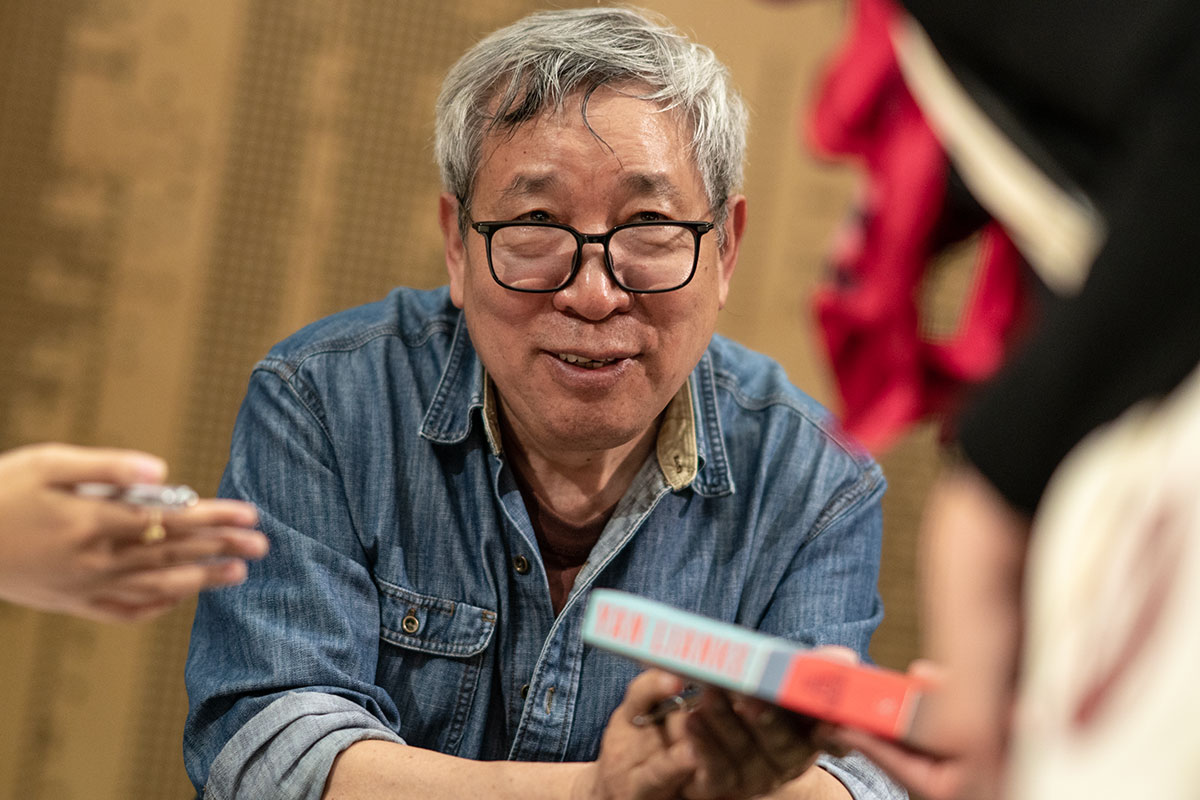
LiteratureXcange Festival in Aarhus (Denmark 2024)
Photo Hreinn Gudlaugsson

Yan Lianke (Chinese: 阎连科; born August 24, 1958) is a Chinese writer of novels and short stories based in Beijing. His work is highly satirical, which has resulted in some of his most renowned works being banned in China. He has admitted to self-censorship while writing his stories in order to avoid censorship.

His novels include Serve the People!, Lenin's Kisses, and Dream of Ding Village. He has also published more than ten volumes of short stories.

Yan won the Franz Kafka Prize in 2014 and has been shortlisted for the Man Booker International Prize twice. His style is described as experimental and surreal, employing a self-described "mythorealism".

== Life ==
Yan Lianke was born in 1958 into a peasant family in Henan Province. Though he lives in Beijing, he has said that his heart remains in Henan, and he has based numerous works on life in Henan, including Dream of Ding Village. He entered the army in 1978. He graduated from Henan University in 1985 with a degree in politics and education. In 1991, he graduated from the People's Liberation Army Art Institute with a degree in literature.

His childhood house was demolished by a farmer who believed that Yan's offers of money were bad faith attempts to lowball the true value, and he demolished the house in hopes of raising the land value, not realizing that the value came from the structure being Yan's house.

== Literary career ==
Yan lives halftime in China, where he teaches at Renmin University in Beijing.

Yan is a member of the China Writers Association. The CWA recognizes him as a writer of "first-rank literary creation", the highest official recognition the body provides to writers of literature.

=== Fiction ===
He published his first short story in 1979. He has published 14 novels and over 40 short stories since then.

His early writings are mostly Realist pieces heavily influenced by 19th century Realism. But towards the end of the 1990s his style displayed a major change. His subsequent works are more infused with wild imagination and creative allegories. His sometimes myth-like dramatic plots are often allegorical depictions of the human conditions.

Yan's writing satirizes Mao-era China and its ideological positions.

A number of his fictions are set in the natural environment of Balou Mountain. It has become the most important setting of Yan's literary world, and the most noted fictional landscape created in Chinese literature. This is particularly true with the publication of the "Balou Mountain Series" comprising The Passing of [Riguang liunian], Hard as Water [Jianying rushui] and Lenin's Kisses [Shouhuo] around 2000. The depictions of Chinese history and reality in these novels are characterised by a sharp edge which is simultaneously profound, absurd and carnivalesque. Yan's protagonists are strange in behavior, and psychologically twisted and complex. This represents another major change in Yan's style from his earlier works. They often provoke surprise in his readers and critics, and debates and controversies at the time of their publication.

Yan became "sensitive" in China at the time of publication of Lenin's Kisses. He openly challenged what he described as Realism of the spirit(s) [Shengshi zhuyi], and advocated for a return to "a realism that transcends reality". Indeed, this makes sense, since Yan himself has said that to live in modern China "is to inhabit a reality that makes you question the very nature of reality." Yan's outward beliefs about the ineffectuality of Realism as an artistic mode have since revived the ongoing debate among Chinese literati on the nature and utility of Literary Realism.

In France, the French translation of Lenin's Kisses has also received critical acclaim. Its translations in other languages have been equally popular. A writer of Le Monde rates Yan's writings highly, and rates him one among the great writers in the world. The same writer suggests that Yan distinguishes himself with his sophisticated insights on the society expressed in his fictions, and that his writings often shows a devastating humour. The Guardian describes him as a master of satire with a rich imagination. Vanity Fair (Italy) notes Yan's mastery in writing between magic and reality. The Frankfurt Christian Science Monitor suggests that Yan possesses both the talent for writing great works and the courage to confront difficult issues. The Japanese magazine The World considers Yan and his writings important setters of standard for Chinese literature and freedom of expression.

The bans imposed on Serve the People! and Dream of Ding Village garnered him notoriety.

The Four Books was published in 2011 in Taiwan. It was also around the same time when he advocated a Realism of the spirit(s) [Shengshi zhuyi], purporting that Chinese literature should represent "the invisible reality", "the reality that is covered up by reality", and "the non-existing reality". This advocacy in the construction of an "absolute reality" is put into practice in his own novels The Explosion Chronicles and The Day the Sun Died. The characters in these works are "Chinese through-and-through". Their plots are depictions of a reality that is "Chinese through-and-through", but filled with imaginative "possibilities" and "mytho-realist" "impossibilities", which express his vision of his China being a "dark", "desperate" place where the idea of "future" only brings "anxieties".

These works are his practice of his avowed aspiration in Discovering Fiction [Faxian xiaoshuo] to create a Chinese literature endowed with the modern spirit of world literature, and differentiate themselves from Western Surrealism, Absurdism and Magical Realism, and that is modern and belongs to the East. In this sense, Yan can be appreciated as a writer of world literature. His novels Serve the People!, Dream of Ding Village, Lenin's Kisses, The Four Books and The Explosion Chronicles have been translated into a number of languages and distributed widely in the Americas, Europe and the Australia. Almost all these translations have attracted attention and critical acclaim for the novels in their respective literary markets. Further, The Explosion Chronicles extended its fame to Africa, being shortlisted with Carlos Rojas' English translation for the GPLA 2017.

In terms of the contents, Yan's fictions have all shown tremendous anxieties in his vision of "the Chinese people", Chinese reality and history. In terms of generic treatment, every one of his novels has displayed a new structure and linguistic style. To many it is his diverse styles, his readiness to break norms, and his capacity to create new literary norms that have differentiate him from other Chinese writers. It is in this connection that he describes himself as "a traitor of literary writing". His is a pioneer of 20th Century Chinese literature, and is the only Chinese writer who has gained international acclaim without any support, either strategic or financial, of the Chinese Government.

=== Literary criticism ===
Yan is the only contemporary Chinese creative writer who has systematically published critical appreciations of 19th and 20th century literatures. These include numerous speeches and dialogues he has given and participated in around the globe, and various pieces of theoretical writings. They are collected in My Reality, My -ism [Wode xianshi, wode zhuyi], The Red Chopsticks of the Witch [Wupo de hong kuaizi], Tearing Apart and Piling Up [Chaijie yu dieping], Selected Overseas Speeches of Yan Lianke [Yan Lianke haiwai yanjiang ji], and Silence and Rest [Chenmo yu chuaixi]. In these works he expresses in detail his understanding of Chinese literature, world literature, and the changes literature has gone through in the past decades. His 2011 publication Discovering Fiction [Faxian xiaoshuo] is an exegesis of his re-discovery of 19th and 20th century Chinese literature and world literature. The book is characterised by his personal style of argument and rationality. It is also in this book that he advocates the differentiation of "full causal relations", "zero causal relations", "half causal relations" and "inner causal relations" in the plots of fiction. He considers this a "new discovery" of fiction writing, and designates it a "Mytho-realism" of Chinese literature. This is the first attempt from a Chinese writer active in the international literary circles to contribute to the theoretical discussions of Realism in the global context. This view of his has been discussed in the academe internationally.

In 2016 Yan was appointed visiting professor of Chinese Culture by the Hong Kong University of Science Technology to teach writing courses. The course material is collected in Twelve Lectures on 19th Century Writings and Twelve Lectures on 20th Century Writings. They contain his analyses of and arguments about the most influential writers of world literature in the 19th and 20th centuries. Of the two Twelve Lectures on 20th Century Writings is more influential, since it represents an attempt of a Chinese writer to review and research on in a comprehensive manner the dissemination and impacts of 20th century world literature on China. It can be used as a research reference or a writing guide.

In the area of critical and theoretical writings, Yan Lianke is the most prolific and vocal among contemporary Chinese writers. Not all writers and critics agree with his views, but he is widely recognised as being unique among contemporary Chinese writer in terms of his persistence in reflecting on methodologies of creative writing.

=== Essays ===
Yan's body of creative works include not only fiction, but also a number of lyrical essays which read in contrast to his fiction. While his fiction is characterized by an acute sense of contemporaneity, rich imagination and a compelling creative impulse, his essays are characterised by a conventional aesthetic of the Chinese essay which comes across as gentle, lyrical, and showing much finesse.

His long essay My Father's Generation and Me [Wo yu fubei], House No.711 [711 hao yuan] and his other collections of essays mostly depict the daily life of the Chinese people, and nature in the four seasons, in a lyricism that comes across familiar to Chinese readers. The styles of his fiction and that of his essays are so different that it is difficult to reconcile them as the same body of works by a single writer. His non-fiction works have created an image of the author in both positive and negative light, so that the author becomes a figure who is rich and multi-faceted in his personality.

=== Mythorealism ===
Mythorealism (shenshi zhuyi 神实主义) is a Yan coinage. Although it has been characterized as a literary device by some critics, it can more accurately be understood as a blending of certain stylistic, formal, and narrative (or storytelling) elements to create a singular literary reality that is divergent from traditional realist representations. Yan has described it as a "creative process" whose aim is to "surpass realism." According to University of Alberta scholar, Haiyan Xie, "mythorealism incorporates both Chinese and Western literary elements while remaining primarily grounded in Chinese cultural and literary tradition." Such a rendering involves rejecting traditional narrative practices, for example linearity, logical cause-and-effect relationships, and, to a certain degree, verisimilitude itself. In Yan's own words:

Mythorealism … abandons the seemingly logical relations of real life and explores a "nonexistent" truth, an invisible truth, and a truth concealed by truth. Mythorealism keeps a distance from any prevailing realism. The mythorealist connection with reality does not lie in straightforward cause-and-effect links, but rather relies on human souls, minds … and the authors' extraordinary fabrications based on reality… . Imaginations, metaphors, myths, legends, dreams, fantasy, demonization, and transplantation born from everyday life and social reality can all serve as mythorealist methods and channels.

In his analysis of certain of Yan's post-Maoist works, Weijie Song, Associate Professor of Chinese Literature at Rutgers – New Brunswick, writes that "…Yan's imaginative configurations of literary settings, from the metamorphosis of his hometown in Henan Province (in particular the Balou Mountains and Northwestern villages) to the transfiguration of post-Maoist Beijing (especially the construction and destruction of his former home in that city, called 'Garden No. 711'), illustrate his grotesque, comic, spectacular, miserable, absurd, and deformed literary world."

Thus, mythorealism is a literary alchemy of sorts—simultaneously a creative process and stylistic mode—that seeks to reshape reality and infuse it with elements of spiritual mythology and magical occurrences. It pulls from a variety of sources and traditions, both within and without the writer's consciousness.

== Novels ==
=== Serve the People! ===
Set during the Cultural Revolution, at the peak of the cult of personality of Chairman Mao, the novel tells the story of an affair between the Liu Lian, the wife of a powerful military commander, and a young soldier, Wu Dawang. The two lovers discover that destroying objects related to Chairman Mao, such as the little red book, is a sexual kink for them. The book is a commentary on the choices people were forced to make during the Cultural Revolution.

The title is a reference to a phrase originally coined by Mao Zedong in a 1944 article of the same name that commemorated the death of the red army soldier Zhang Side. During the Cultural Revolution, this article was required reading for millions of Chinese, and the slogan was widely used. Due to the sex scenes and political content, the story attracted controversy when it was featured the magazine Huacheng in 2005. The Chinese government ordered the publisher to recall all 40,000 copies of the magazine, which in turn created huge demand for the novel. The novel drew criticism from socialist realist writers in China who objected to its satire and what they deemed its scandalous depictions.

=== Dream of Ding Village ===
Yan's novel Dream of Ding Village (丁庄梦) is a novel about people with AIDS trying to survive with little outside help. Yan visited people with AIDS and even lived with villagers for periods of time to make sure the novel was accurate. Dream of Ding Village has been compared with Albert Camus' The Plague (1947). Dream of Ding Village was published in Hong Kong in 2006, where it was again banned by the Chinese government for its content.

=== Other major works ===
Yan started publishing in 1979. So far the body of works he has produced includes 15 novels, more than 50 novellas, more than 40 short stories, 3 extended essays, 5 collection of essays, 6 collections of literary criticisms, and about a dozen TV and film scripts, amount to over 10 million Chinese characters. However, because of both the controversial nature of and the Chinese government's ban on his works, a considerable part of this body of works has not been published in China. These include the novels Serve the People! [Wei renmin fuwu], Dream of Ding Village [Dingzhuang meng], The Four Books, [Sishu], The Dimming Sun [Rixi], and a range of his essays and speeches. Many of his works have been translated and circulated in more than 30 languages including English, French, German, Spanish, Italian, Swedish, Danish, Norwegian, Czech, Hungarian, Japanese, Korean, Vietnamese, Mongolian and Portuguese.

== Works ==
=== Novels ===
Year	Original title	English title
1991	情感獄	The Hell of Feelings
1993	最後一名女知青	The Last Female Educated Youth
1995	生死晶黃	Crystal Yellow in Life and Death
1997	金蓮，你好	How are You, Pan Jinlian
1998	日光流年	The Passage of Time
2001	堅硬如水	Hard as Water
2001	斗雞	Cock Fight
2001	穿越	Transgression
2004	受活	Lenin's Kisses
2005	為人民服務	Serve the People!
2006	丁莊夢	Dream of Ding Village
2008	風雅頌	The Odes of Songs
2010	夏日落	Summer Sunset
2011	四書	The Four Books
2013	炸裂志	The Explosion Chronicles
2015	日熄	The Day the Sun Died
2018	速求共眠	Want to Sleep Together Quickly
2020	心經	Heart Sutra
2021	中国故事	The Family Plot

=== Short story and novella collections ===
Year	Original title	English title
1992	鄉里故事	Stories of the Neighbourhood
1994	和平寓言	Peace Allegory
1995	朝着天堂走	The Road to Heaven
1996	閻連科文集﹙5卷﹚	Collected Works of Yan Lianke (5 volumes)
1997	閻連科小說自選集	Collected Stories by Yan Lianke
1998	歡樂家園	Happy Home
1998	黄金洞	The Golden Cave
1999	陰晴圓缺：重說千古淫婦潘金蓮	Waxing and Waning: A Second Look on the Legendary Slut Pan Jinlian
2000	朝著東南走	To the Southeast
2001	耙耧天歌	Marrow
2002	三棒槌	The Hammer
2002	鄉村歲月	Days in the Village
2002	年月日	The Years, Months, Days
2003	當代作家文庫 閻連科卷	Works by Contemporary Writers: Yan Lianke
2005	天宮圖	The Map of Heaven
2006	革命浪漫主義：閻連科短篇小說代表作	Revolutionary Romanticism: Representative Short Stories of Yan Lianke
2006	母親是條河	Mother is a River
2007	瑤溝人的夢	Dream of the People of Yao Valley
2007	閻連科文集﹙12卷﹚	Works by Yan Lianke (12 volumes)
2007	阎连科作品精选集（17卷）	Representative Works of Yan Lianke (17 Volumes)
2009	四號禁區	No. Four Restricted Zone
2009	天宮圖	The Map of Heaven
2009	朝着東南走	To the Southeast
2010	閻連科小說精選集	Representative Works of Yan Lianke
2010	桃園春醒	Awaking in the Cherry Garden
2011	藝妓芙蓉 ：閻連科中篇小說編年 1988-1990﹙第1輯﹚	Geisha Blossoms: Novellas by Yan Lianke (Volume One) 1988-1990
2011	中士還鄉 ：閻連科中篇小說編年 1991-1993﹙第2輯﹚	The Scholar Returns: Novellas by Yan Lianke (Volume Two) 1991-1993
2011	耙耬山脉 ：閻連科中篇小說編年 1993-1996﹙第3輯﹚	Balou Mountains: Novellas by Yan Lianke (Volume Three) 1993-1996
2011	桃園春醒：閻連科中篇小說編年 1996-2009﹙第4輯﹚	Awaking in the Cherry Garden: Novellas by Yan Lianke (Volume Four) 1996-2009
2013	閻連科短篇小說精選	Representative Works of Yan Lianke
2014	黑白閻連科——中篇四書﹙四卷﹚	Yan Lianke in Black and White: Novella in Four Books (4 volumes)

=== Essay collections ===
Year	Original title	English title
1999	褐色桎梏	Brown Shackles
2002	返身回家	Homeward Bound
2002	巫婆的紅筷子：作家與文學博士對話錄﹙與梁鴻合著﹚	The Witch's Red Chopsticks: A Dialogue between a Writer and a Literature Ph.D. (Co-authored with Liang Hong)
2005	没有邊界的跨越：閻連科散文	Transgression without Borders: Essays by Yan Lianke
2008	土黄與草青：閻連科親情散文	Yellow Earth and Green Grass: Yan Lianke's Essays on Family and Feelings
2008	機巧與魂靈：閻連科讀書筆記	The Wit and the Soul: Yan Lianke's Reading Notes
2008	拆解與疊拼：閻連科文學演講	Deconstruction and Juxtaposition: Speeches on Literature by Yan Lianke
2009	閻連科散文	Essays by Yan Lianke
2009	我與父輩	My Father's Generation and I
2011	我的現實，我的主義：閻連科文學對話錄﹙與張學昕合著﹚	My Reality, My -isms: A Dialogue with Yan Lianke on Literature (co-authored with Zhang Xuexin)
2011	走着瞧	Let's Go and See
2011	發現小說	Discovering Fiction
2012	711 號園	No. 711
2012	一派胡言：閻連科海外演講集	A Load of BS: Yan Lianke's Overseas Speeches
2013	閻連科散文	Essays by Yan Lianke
2013	寫作最難是糊塗	The Most Difficult Thing about Writing is to Stay Confused
2013	他的話一路散落	His Words Scatter on the Way
2013	一個人的三條河 感念	Thoughts by One Person on Three Rivers
2014	走在別人的路上：閻連科語思錄	Walking on Other People's Path: Reflections of Yan Lianke
2014	黑白閻連科——散文四書﹙四卷﹚	Yan Lianke in Black and White: Essays in Four Books (4 volumes)
2014	沉默與喘息：我所經歷的中國文學	Silence and Rest: Chinese Literature in My Experience
2015	兩代人的十二月﹙與蔣方舟合著﹚	December of Two Generations

=== Translated works ===
Original publication		English publication		
Title	Year	Title	Translator(s)	Year
受活; Shou Huo	2004	Lenin's Kisses	Carlos Rojas	2012
为人民服务; Wei Renmin Fufu	2005	Serve the People!	Julia Lovell	2008
丁庄梦; Ding Zhuang Meng	2006	Dream of Ding Village	Cindy Carter	2011
坚硬如水; Jianying Ru Shui	2009	Hard Like Water	Carlos Rojas	2020
四书; Si Shu	2011	The Four Books	Carlos Rojas	2015
炸裂志; Zhalie Zhi	2013	The Explosion Chronicles	Carlos Rojas	2016
日熄; Rixi	2015	The Day the Sun Died	Carlos Rojas	2018
心經; Xinjing	2020	Heart Sutra	Carlos Rojas	2023
中國故事; Zhongguo Gushi	2021	The Family Plot	Jeremy Tiang	2027

== Awards and honours ==
- 1997 Lu Xun Literary Prize for "Huang Jin Dong" (黄金洞)
- 2001 Lu Xun Literary Prize for "Years Months Days" (年月日)
- 2005 Yazhou Zhoukan, "The Best Ten Books Award" for Dream of Ding Village
- 2004 Lao She Literary Award for :Lenin's Kisses (《受活》)
- 2005 Asia Weekly 10 Best Novels award for Dream of Ding Village
- 2011 Man Asian Literary Prize, Dream of Ding Village, longlist
- 2014 Franz Kafka Prize, winner
- 2016 Man Booker International Prize, The Four Books, shortlist
- 2016 Dream of the Red Chamber Award, The Day the Sun Died, winner
- 2017 Grand Prix of Literary Associations, The Explosion Chronicles, shortlisted in the Belles-Lettres Category
- 2017 Man Booker International Prize, Long listed The Explosion Chronicles
- 2021 Newman Prize for Chinese Literature
- 2021 Elected a Royal Society of Literature International Writer

== See also ==
- Hu Jia
- Plasma Economy
- Weiquan movement
