= The Years, Months, Days =

Novella

The Years, Months, Days is a collection of two novellas by Yan Lianke. It was translated into English by Carlos Rojas and published in 2017 by Black Cat, as well as by Text Publishing in Australia.

One novella, entitled The Years, Months, Days, was first published in 1997. It has the same title as the collection. It features an old man, 72 years of age driven from the village he served as an elder, along with his neighbors, by a drought. The old man has a dog, named "Blindy", who cannot see. The man has a piece of cornstalk which is the third character. Jamie Fisher of The New York Times described the elder as "barely lucid but often wise", and compared him to a typical character of a Samuel Beckett play. Fisher stated that in the novella " The minimal staging recalls a Beckett play."

The other novella, entitled Marrow, was first published in 2001. Fourth Wife You discovers that her four children, previously "born apparently normal" in the words of Kirkus Reviews, have become mentally handicapped, leading their hometown to be renamed "Four Idiots Village". She tries to convince a man they call "a wholer" to marry her third daughter. She learns that her children can gain intelligence if they drink a soup produced from bones of the people related to them. Fisher described the story as "a saucy sendup of" zhuguai fiction.

== Writing style ==
Fisher stated that the first novella has a "nauseatingly vivid" depiction of its setting. He added that since human excretions and large women's breasts "almost qualify as secondary characters", the stories show "Yan’s world [as being] earthy, male and often very juvenile".

== Reception ==
Peter Craven of the Sydney Morning Herald praised the "metaphorical lushness" in the text and that The Years, Months, Days is "a hopeful book Yan Lianke has made out of the very essence of hopelessness."

Publishers Weekly stated that the stories feel "almost epic".

Kirkus Reviews stated that the collection is "memorable literature".
