= Peter Gries =

Peter Hays Gries is the Lee Kai Hung Chair and founding Director of the Manchester China Institute at the University of Manchester, where he is also Professor of Chinese politics.

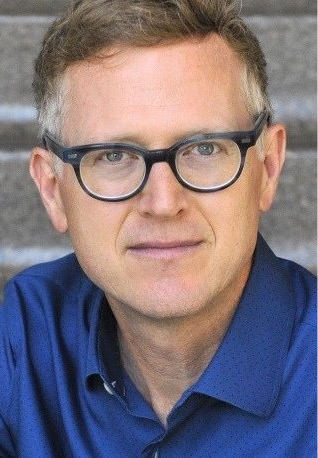
Peter Gries

== Biography ==
Peter Gries was born in Singapore and grew up in Hong Kong, Washington, DC, Tokyo, and Beijing. He later earned bachelor's and master's degrees in Asian Studies at Middlebury and Michigan, and a PhD in politics from UC Berkeley. After a two-year postdoc at Ohio State, he was assistant professor of political science at the University of Colorado, Boulder for five years. He then spent eleven years at the University of Oklahoma, where he founded and directed the Institute for US-China Issues and its two signature programs (the Newman Prize for Chinese Literature, and the US-China Diplomatic Dialogue.)

Gries joined the University of Manchester as Professor of Chinese Politics in August 2017. After an autumn of fundraising and a £5M donation endowing a new China Institute, in December 2017 he became the Lee Kai Hung Chair and founding Director of the Manchester China Institute, which was formally launched in May 2018. Its two signature programs are the UK-China International Photography Competition, and the UK-China Diplomatic Dialogue.

== Books ==
- The Politics of American Foreign Policy: How Ideology Divides Liberals and Conservatives over Foreign Affairs (Stanford, 2014)
- China’s New Nationalism: Pride, Politics, and Diplomacy (California, 2004)
- State and Society in 21st Century China: Crisis, Contention, and Legitimation, ed. (Routledge, 2004)
- Chinese Politics: State, Society, and the Market, ed. (Routledge, 2010)

== Articles (selected) ==
- “Proscribing the ‘Spiritually Japanese’: Nationalist Indignation, Authoritarian Responsiveness, and Regime Legitimation in China Today,” China Quarterly (online first, in print 2021). Gries & Wang.
- “Ideology and International Relations,” Current Opinion in Behavioral Sciences, 34 (2020). Gries & Yam.
- “A new measure of the ‘Democratic Peace’: What country feeling thermometer data can teach us about the drivers of American and Western European foreign policy,” Political Research Exchange, 2.1 (2020). Gries, et al.
- “Taiwan’s perilous futures: Chinese Nationalism, the 2020 Presidential Elections, and U.S.-China Tensions Spell Trouble for Cross-strait Relations,” World Affairs 183.1 (Winter 2020). Peter Gries and Tao Wang.
- “Are the US and China fated to fight? How narratives of ‘power transition’ shape great power war or peace,” Cambridge Review of International Affairs, 32.4 (2019). Gries & Jing.
- “When objective group membership and subjective ethnic identification don’t align: Testing theories of intergroup relations in Taiwan,” Group Processes & Intergroup Relations, 21.4 (2018). Lee, Su, & Gries.
- “War or Peace? How the Subjective Perception of Great Power Interdependence Shapes Pre-emptive Defensive Aggression,” Frontiers in Psychology, 8 (2017). Jing, Gries, et al.
- “Does Ideology Matter?” Social Science Quarterly, 98.1 (2017).
- “ ‘Religious Nones’ in the UK: How Atheists and Agnostics Think about Religion and Politics,” Politics and Religion, 10 (2017). Clements & Gries.
- “Race, knowledge production, and Chinese nationalism,” Nations and Nationalism, 22.3 (2016). Carrico & Gries.
- “Liberals, Conservatives, and Latin America: How Ideology Divides Americans over Immigration and Foreign Aid,” Latin American Research Review, 51.3 (2016).
- “Popular Nationalism and China’s Japan Policy: The Diaoyu/Senkaku Islands Controversy, 2012-2013,” Journal of Contemporary China, 25.99 (2016). Gries, Steiger & Wang.
- “How socialization shapes Chinese views of America and the world,” Japanese Journal of Political Science, 17.1 (2016). Gries & Sanders.
- “National Images as Integrated Schemas: Subliminal Primes of Image Attributes Shape Foreign Policy Preferences,” Political Psychology, 37.3 (2016). Castano, Bonacossa, & Gries.
- “Hollywood in China: How American Popular Culture Shapes Chinese Views of the ‘Beautiful Imperialist,’ an Experimental Analysis,” The China Quarterly, 224 (2015). Gries, Sanders, Stroup, & Cai.
- “How Ideology Divides American Liberals and Conservatives over Israel,” Political Science Quarterly, 130.1 (2015).
- “ ‘Red China’ and the ‘Yellow Peril’: How Ideology Divides Americans over China,” Journal of East Asian Studies 14 (2014).
- “Taiwanese Views of China & the World: Party Identification, Ethnicity, and Cross–Strait Relations,” Japanese Journal of Political Science, 14.1 (2013): 73–96. Gries & Su.
- “Toward the Scientific Study of Polytheism: Beyond Forced-Choice Measures of Religious Belief,” Journal for the Scientific Study of Religion, 51.4 (2012). Gries, Su & Schak.
- “Disillusionment and Dismay: How Chinese Netizens Think and Feel about the Two Koreas,” Journal of East Asian Studies, 12 (2012).
- “God, guns, and... China? How ideology impacts American attitudes and policy preferences toward China,” International Relations of the Asia-Pacific, 12.1 (2012). Gries, Crowson & Cai.
- “When knowledge is a double edged sword: Contact, media exposure, and American attitudes towards China” Journal of Social Issues, 67.4 (2011). Gries, Crowson, & Cai.
- “Toward a social psychology of globalization.” Journal of Social Issues, 67.4 (2011). Chiu, Gries, Torelli, & Cheng.
- “Patriotism, nationalism, and China’s U.S. policy: Structures and Consequences of Chinese National Identity,” The China Quarterly, 205 (2011). Gries, Zhang, Crowson, & Cai.
- “The Spectre of Communism in US China Policy: Bipartisanship in the American subconscious,” The Chinese Journal of International Politics, 3 (2010). Gries, Cai, & Crowson.
- “The Olympic effect on American attitudes towards China: Beyond personality, ideology, and media exposure,” Journal of Contemporary China, 19.64 (2010). Gries, Crowson, & Sandel.
- “Contentious histories and the perception of threat: China, the U.S., and the Korean War, an experimental analysis,” Journal of East Asian Studies, 3.3 (2009). Gries, et al.
- “Problems of misperception in U.S.-China relations,” Orbis: A Journal of World Affairs, 53.2 (2009).
- “Historical beliefs and the perception of threat in Northeast Asia: Colonialism, the tributary system, and China-Japan-Korea relations in the Twenty-First Century,” International Relations of the Asia-Pacific, 9.2 (2009). Gries, et al.
- “Harmony, hegemony, & U.S.-China relations,” World Literature Today, 81.5 (2007).
- “Forecasting US-China relations, 2015,” Asian Security, 2.2 (2006).
- “The Koguryo controversy, national identity, and Sino-Korean relations today,” East Asia: An International Quarterly, 22.4 (2005).
- “China’s ‘new thinking’ on Japan,” The China Quarterly, 184 (2005).
- “Social psychology and the identity-conflict debate: Is a ‘China Threat’ inevitable?” European Journal of International Relations, 11.2 (2005).
- “China eyes the hegemon,” Orbis: A Journal of World Affairs, 49.3 (2005).
- “The perception of the other in international relations: Evidence for the polarizing effect of entitativity,” Political Psychology, 24.3 (2003). Castano, Sacchi, & Gries.
- “Culture clash? Apologies East and West,” Journal of Contemporary China, 11.30 (2002). Gries & Peng.
- “Tears of rage: Chinese nationalism and the Belgrade embassy bombing,” The China Journal, 46 (2001).
