= Servant of the People (disambiguation) =

Servant of the People is a Ukrainian political party.

Servant of the People or Servants of the People may also refer to:

- Servant of the People (2015 TV series), a 2015 Ukrainian television program
  - Servant of the People 2, a 2016 Ukrainian movie based on the TV show of the same name
- Servant of the People (2023 TV series), a 2023 Polish television series
- Servants of the People Society, an Indian social service organization founded in 1921
- Servants of the People: The Inside Story of New Labour, a 2000 book by Andrew Rawnsley

== See also ==
- Serve the People (disambiguation)
