= Jia Jinglong =

Jia Jinglong (simplified Chinese: 贾敬龙; traditional Chinese: 賈敬龍; pinyin: jia jing long) (born in 1986, died on 15 November 2016, Shijiazhuang, China) is a Chinese national convicted and executed for the murder of the village's local head of the Chinese Communist Party He Jianhua. Jia carried out the murder to protest being expropriated out of his newly built home without appropriate compensation. Despite the brutal nature of the murder–the victim was shot in the back of the head with a nail gun–Jia's plight generated widespread sympathy within China. The courts upheld the death sentence, probably to avoid setting a precedent by legitimizing a protest against government policies.
