= Dream of Ding Village =

Novel by Yan Lianke

- First edition (Chinese)
- Author: Yan Lianke
- Original title: 丁庄梦; Ding zhuang meng
- Translator: Cindy Carter
- Language: Chinese
- Publisher: Shanghai wenyi
- Publication date: 2006
- Publication place: China
- English publication date: 2011
- Pages: 288
- ISBN: 9787532129485

Dream of Ding Village
- Simplified Chinese: 丁庄梦
- Traditional Chinese: 丁莊夢
Transcriptions
Standard Mandarin
- Hanyu Pinyin: Dīng Zhuāng Mèng

Dream of Ding Village (Chinese: 丁庄梦; pinyin: Dīng zhuāng mèng) is a 2006 novel by the Chinese writer Yan Lianke. The 2011 English translation by Cindy Carter, published in the UK by Grove Press, was shortlisted for the Independent Foreign Fiction Prize.

It is a story based on the blood sales in rural Henan province that sparked a major AIDS crisis in China. After the first edition sold out, it was banned—no more copies can be printed in China. Yan Lianke has stated in interviews that the book could have been better if he had not been self-censoring himself to ensure it could be published. This ban is said to have been lifted in 2011.

In 2011, a film adaptation of this novel named Love for Life was released in China, which is directed by Gu Changwei and stars Zhang Ziyi and Aaron Kwok.

== Origins ==
Much like the Taiwanese writer, Wu He, who lived in indigenous mountain villages while researching his novel Remains of Life, Yan spent three years living in and traveling through various regions of Henan Province. Posing as the assistant to an anthropologist, Yan went from village to village throughout Henan, documenting the impacts of the AIDS outbreak. His original conception was for the book to be a work of non-fiction, the purpose of which was to "educate a population which knew of AIDS only as the 'nameless fever.'"

== Characters ==
- Ding Qiang – young 12 year old boy. Qiang was poisoned and died in the very beginning of the novel. The entire story is narrated through his point of view.
- Father (Ding Hui) – blood kingpin of Ding village. One of the few characters who did not contract HIV. Ding Hui becomes very successful, and eventually assumes the position of Chairman of the County Task Force.
- Uncle (Ding Liang) – Ding Hui's brother.
- Grandpa (Ding Shuiyang) – Teacher and custodian at the local school.
- Tingting – Uncle's wife and eventual ex-wife.
- Lingling – wife of Ding Xiaoming (Uncle's cousin). Later Lingling divorces her husband and marries Ding Liang.
- Zhao Xiuqin – main cook at the school.
- Ding Yuejin and Jia Genzhu – residents who eventually take over the school and the official village seal.
- Ma Xianglin – musician who performs for the village while they wait for the supposedly new HIV medication.
- Li Sanren (ex-mayor).
- Sister (Yinzi) – eventually moves out of Ding Village with her mother.

== Thematic Concerns ==
Yan's novel explores a number of perennial themes in Chinese literature, among them filicide, filial discord and unraveling, familial ethics, and bloodlines. Blood itself assumes a potent symbolic value, at once standing for the blood of the individual, familial blood, the blood of a nation, and, finally, an economic resource. According to Haiyan Xie, Associate Professor of Comparative Literature and Translation Studies, Central China Normal University, "[Blood] is associated with the notorious xuejiang jingji 血浆经济 (plasma economy) promoted by some local governments in rural China as a policy to alleviate poverty. The so-called 'plasma economy' was the main reason for the outbreak of AIDS in Henan province during the 1990s, particularly in its impoverished remote areas." The narrative uses the metaphor of contaminated blood to convey the "collapse of a rural social order that was based on blood kinship and familial solidarity, as the traditional discourses of filial piety, marital faithfulness, and love between siblings are transgressed and subsumed by the larger socio-political context." Thus, Yan is able to make a broader political critique by way of the microcosms of the family and the rural village, exposing the ways in which these smaller social units disintegrate when traditional values are discarded for things like avarice, lust, illicit power-grabbing, and interpersonal enmity.

== Reception ==
Kirkus Reviews stated that it was "A sorrowful but captivating novel about the price of progress in modern China."

== Translation ==
- Yan Lianke (2011). Dream of Ding Village. Translated by Cindy Carter. Grove Press. ISBN 978-0-8021-1932-2.

== See also ==
- 2006 in literature
- Chinese literature
- Plasma Economy
