= Jia Pingwa =

Chinese writer, Mao Dun Literature Prize winner

Jia Pingwa 贾平凹
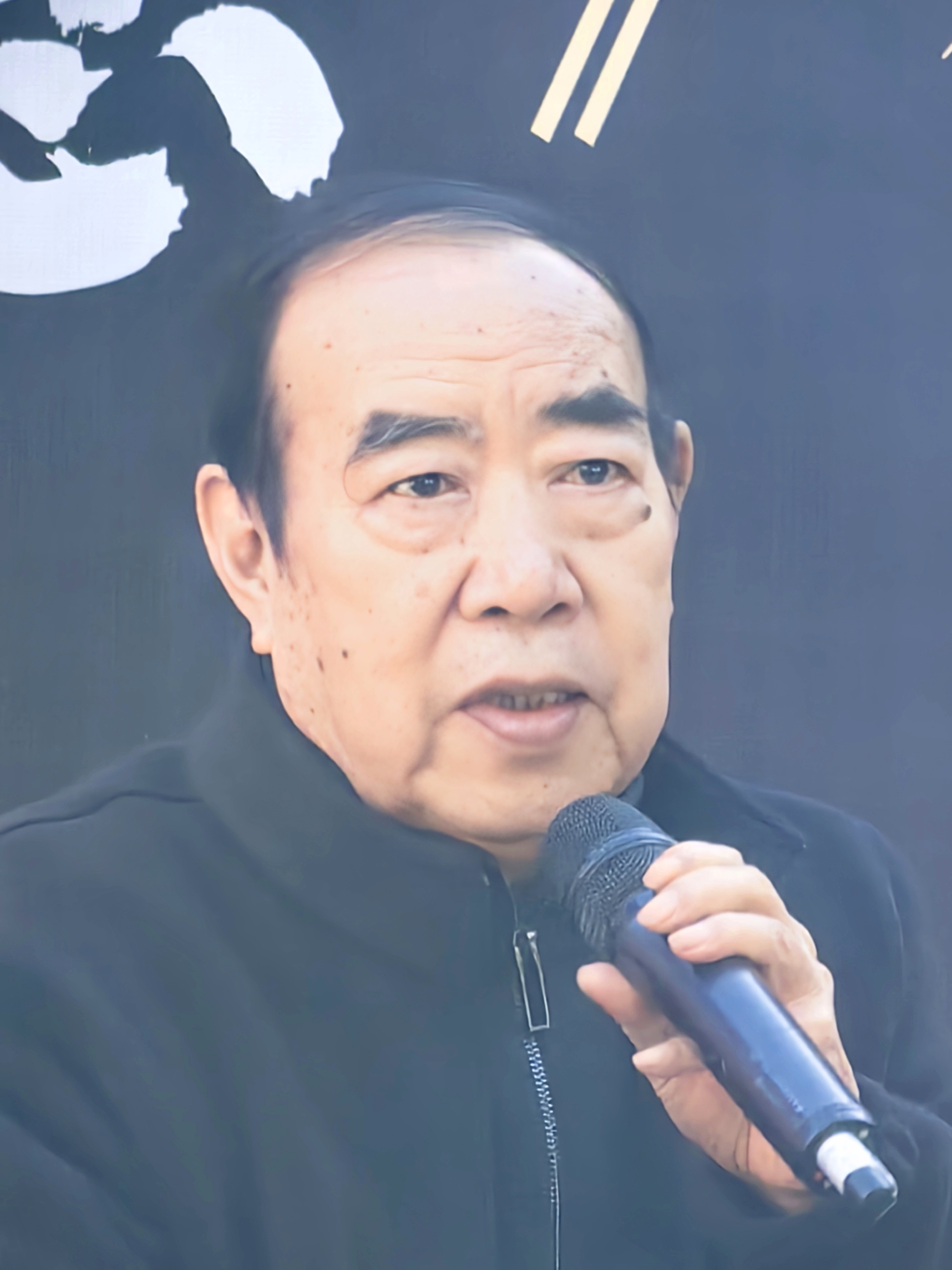
- Jia Pingwa (2025)
- Born: Jia Pingwa (贾平娃); 21 February 1952 (age 74); Dihua Village, Danfeng County, Shangluo, Shaanxi, China
- Education: Northwest University (1971-5)
- Occupation: Writer
- Spouse(s): Han Junfang (韩俊芳) (1979.1.22-1992.11.26); Guo Mei (郭梅) (1996.12.12– present)
- Children: Jia Qianqian (贾浅浅); Jia Ruo (贾若)
- Relatives: Jia Yanchun (贾彦春) (father); Zhou Xiao'e (周小鹅) (mother)
- Writing career
- Pen name: Jia Pingwa
- Language: Chinese
- Period: 1973 – present
- Notable works: Ruined City, The Shaanxi Opera

Chinese name
- Traditional Chinese: 賈平娃
- Simplified Chinese: 贾平娃
- Literal meaning: Ordinary Child Jia
Transcriptions
Standard Mandarin
- Hanyu Pinyin: Jiǎ Píngwá

Alternative Chinese name
- Traditional Chinese: 賈平凹
- Simplified Chinese: 贾平凹
- Literal meaning: Flat-uneven Jia
Transcriptions
Standard Mandarin
- Hanyu Pinyin: Jiǎ Píngwā
- IPA: [tɕjà pʰǐŋ.wá]

Jia Pingwa (born 21 February 1952) is one of China's most popular authors of novels, short stories, poetry, and non-fiction. His best-known novels include Ruined City, which was banned by the State Publishing Administration for over 17 years for its explicit sexual content, and The Shaanxi Opera, winner of the 2009 Mao Dun Literature Prize.

== Early life and teen years ==
Born in Dihua (棣花) Village, Danfeng County, Shangluo, Shaanxi in 1952, only three years after the founding of the People's Republic of China, as the son of a school teacher, Jia Yanchun (贾彦春), Jia had an early role model for his later decision to become a writer. Due to a shortage of qualified teachers in Shaanxi at the time, however, Jia's father was often away from home and so he spent much of his early childhood with his mother, Zhou Xiao'e (周小鹅). With the advent of the Cultural Revolution in 1966, Jia Yanchun was accused of being a counter-revolutionary and he spent the next ten years in a labour (laogai) camp. Three years later, with the closing of all schools in China following the excesses of the Red Guards, Jia was dispatched with his classmates to build reservoirs in the countryside.

== Pen name ==
Jia's given name, 平娃 (Píngwá), literally means 'ordinary child', a name suggested to Jia's parents by a fortune teller following the death of their firstborn child. He later chose the pen name 平凹 (Píngwā), a play on his given name, as the character for 'ordinary' also means 'flat', and in southern Shaanxi dialect the character for 'concave' (and by extension 'uneven') 凹 is pronounced wā, similar to wá ('child') in his given name. Because 'uneven' 凹 is usually pronounced āo in Standard Chinese, however, his name is often misread as "Píng'āo".

== Education and early career ==
While working on a production brigade, Jia had the good fortune to attract the attention of local party cadres after volunteering to write revolutionary slogans, and thanks to their support he was sent to study literature at Northwest University in Xi'an in 1971. Two years later, Jia's first short story, "A Pair of Socks", appeared in The Xi'an Daily, and was soon followed by many others. After graduating in 1975 Jia found employment at Shaanxi People's Publishing House editing the monthly magazine Chang'an, and in 1978 his short story "Full Moon" won a national award from the China Writers Association. These early were collected in Soldier Boy and Morning Songs. Like many stories published during this period (but quite different from his later work), Jia's early stories feature brave young men and women committed to the cause of Chinese socialism.

== Turn towards native-place fiction ==
Inspired perhaps by the worsening health of his father, who had fallen into alcoholism, in 1980 Jia published his first collection of rural fiction set in his home province of Shaanxi, Notes from the Highlands, and in 1982, on the strength of his published short stories and essays, Jia was admitted the Xi'an Literary Federation, allowing him to pursue writing full-time. Although he found himself under greater scrutiny, even becoming a target of criticism during the Anti-Spiritual Pollution Campaign of late 1983, Jia's sketches of everyday life in Shangzhou (the traditional name for his native region) were published to greater and greater success, with the novellas First Records of Shangzhou, Further Records of Shangzhou and More Records of Shangzhou appearing between 1983 and 1986.

In 1986, Jia published his first novel, Shangzhou, an account of a young fugitive who the police suspect of having committed a robbery in the city. He decides to hide out in his rural hometown, giving Jia a narrative framework around which to structure his popular descriptions of life in the countryside. This novel was quickly followed by two more: Turbulence in 1987 and Pregnancy in 1988. This flurry of activity was interrupted by the death of Jia's father in 1989. Grief would compel Jia to take a more introspective tone with his next project, conceived as a semi-autobiographical account of a morally depraved author from the countryside who has been corrupted by fame.

=== Ruined City ===
In the 1993 novel Ruined City, frank depictions of various sexual acts (drawing comparisons to the Ming dynasty vernacular classic the Jin Ping Mei) earned the book both a wide audience and a 17-year ban from the authorities, causing it to become one of the most pirated books in modern Chinese literature. Like Jin Ping Mei and other classic erotic Chinese novels, Ruined City empty blocks to indicate the number of characters that Jia deleted to satisfy censors that the descriptions of sex were not impermissibly obscene.

The novel first appeared in the literary magazine Shiyue and was published as a book promptly thereafter. The publisher engaged in a major promotional campaign, and rumors spread regarding how detailed the novel's descriptions of sex would be. The novel became an immediate commercial success for Jia and the publisher.

Intense media and academic debate focused on the book's literary merit. Other aspects of public debate focused on the role of the market in China's publishing industry.

On 20 January 1994, the Beijing Municipal Office for News and Publication issued an order confiscating all circulating copies of the novel (it was the body with jurisdiction because the publisher was based in Beijing). Applying the laws on obscenity, it also required the publisher to disgorge the profits and pay a fine of double the profits.

By 2009, sexual mores in China had changed and the book was unbanned. The only change in the text was the replacement of the empty block with ellipses.

== After Ruined City and present day ==
Jia was not personally affected by the ban on Ruined City. He continued to write and publish both domestically and internationally and won several major literary prizes.

He published a trilogy of rural novels: White Nights (1995), Earth Gate (1996), and Old Gao Village (1998). This was followed by the modern fable Wolves of Yesterday (2000), about a Wu Song-like hunter chasing a modern-day environmentalist who turns into a wolf, a historical romance and counter-history Heath Report (2002), and The Shaanxi Opera (2005), a challenging work incorporating elements of local Shaanxi operas which earned him the 2008 Mao Dun Literature Award. Over the last decade, Jia has completed five additional novels: Happy (2007), Old Kiln (2011), The Lantern Bearer (2013), Lao Sheng (2014), and Jihua (2016).

In 1992 Jia was admitted to the prestigious Chinese Writers Association, later being elected Chairman of Shaanxi branch of the organization and in 2003 he was appointed dean of the School of Humanities and the Dean of the College of Arts at Xi'an University of Architecture and Technology. Additionally, he is a member of the National Committee of the Chinese People's Political Consultative Conference and Xi'an People's Congress, a member of the Presidium of the Chinese Writers' Association, the Xi'an Literary Federation President, an honorary chairman of the Xi'an Writers' Association, the editor-in-chief of the literary journal Essay 《美文》, and writer-in-residence at the Ocean University of China.

== Style ==
Jia Pingwa is known for mixing traditional vernacular story-telling with modern realism in his work, which Carlos Rojas describes as being "explicitly rooted in the breathless modernization of contemporary urban China, while at the same time... [featuring] a nostalgic fascination with the historical tradition which that same modernization process simultaneously threatens to erase."

== List of works ==
Novels:

- Shangzhou (商州, 1986) Shangzhou, currently untranslated.
- Fuzao (浮躁, 1987) English translation Turbulence by Howard Goldblatt (Louisiana State University Press, 1991, republished by Grove Press, 2003). Winner of the 1991 Pegasus Prize.
- Renshen (妊娠, 1988) Pregnancy, currently untranslated.
- Fei Du (废都, 1993) English translation Ruined City by Howard Goldblatt (University of Oklahoma Press, 2016).
- Bai Ye (白夜, 1995) White Nights, currently untranslated.
- Tu Men (土门, 1996) English translation The Earthen Gate by Hu Longfeng and He Longping (Valley Press, 2018).
- Gao Lao Zhuang (高老庄, 1998) Old Gao Village, currently untranslated.
- Huainian Lang (怀念狼, 2000) Wolves of Yesterday, currently untranslated.
- Bingxiang Baogao (病相报告, 2002) Health Report, currently untranslated.
- Qin Qiang (秦腔, 2005) English translation The Shaanxi Opera by Nicky Harman and Dylan Levi King (AmazonCrossing, 2023). Winner of the 2008 Mao Dun Literature Prize.
- Gaoxing (高兴, 2007) English translation Happy Dreams by Nicky Harman (AmazonCrossing, 2017).
- Gu Lu (古炉, 2011) English translation Old Kiln, by James Trapp, Olivia Milburn and Christopher Payne (Sinoist Books, 2025).
- Dai Deng (带灯, 2013) English translation The Lantern Bearer by Carlos Rojas (CN Times Books, 2016).
- Lao Sheng (老生, 2014) English translation The Mountain Whisperer by Christopher Payne (Sinoist Books, 2021).
- Ji Hua (极花, 2016) English translation Broken Wings by Nicky Harman (Sinoist Books, 2019).
- Shan Ben (山本, 2018) Shan Ben, currently untranslated.
- Zan Zuo (暂坐, 2020) English translation The Sojourn Teashop by Jun Liu and Nicky Harman (Sinoist Books, 2023).
- Jiang Dou (酱豆, 2020) Soybean, currently untranslated.

Short story collections:

- Bing Wa 兵娃 (Boy soldier, 1977)
- Shandi Biji 山地笔记 (Mountain notes, 1980)
- Layue, Zhengyue 腊月，正月 (December and January, 1985)
- Tiangou 天狗 (Heavenly dog, 1986)
- Heishi 黑氏 (Black clan, 1993)
- Zhizao Shengyin 制造声音 (Creating sounds, 1998)
- Jiaozi Guan 饺子馆 (Dumpling restaurant, 2002)
- Yishujia Han Qixiang 艺术家韩起祥 (The artist Han Qixiang, 2006), etc.
  - a selection from Jia Pingwa's 丑石 (Chou Shi; 'Ugly Rock'), a short story about a meteorite which he and the local community had thought of for many years as a worthless ugly rock, is one of the potential reading topics for Putonghua Proficiency Test test-takers

Essay collections:

- Yueji 月迹 (The trace of the moon, 1982),
- Shangzhou Sanlu 商州三录 (Three chapters about Shangzhou, 1986)
- Hong Hu 红狐 (Red fox, 1994)
- Zao Yizuo Fangzi Zhu Meng 造一座房子住梦 (Build a house to live in a dream, 1998)
- Qiao Men 敲门 (Knock on the door, 1998)
- Wo Shi Nongmin 我是农民 (I am a peasant, 1998)
- Lao Xi'an: Feidu Xieyang 老西安：废都斜阳 (Old Xi'an: the deserted capital in sunset, 1999), etc.

Poetry:

- "Blank", etc.

== Awards and honours ==
- 1978, Best Short Story of the Year for Full Moon.
  - This short story was first published in the literary magazine Shanghai Art, 3rd Volume, 1978.
- 1984, The Best Novel of the Third National Novellas for December and January.
  - This novel was first published in the literary magazine October, 5th Volume, 1984.
- 1991, the Pegasus prize in literature for Turbulence: A Novel.
- 1991 August 21, Zhuang Zhongwen Literature Prize.
- 1997, French Prix Femina étranger for La Capitale déchue, Genevieve Imbot-Bichet's translation of Ruined City into French.
- 2003, Knight of Arts and Literature by the French Ministry of Culture and Communication.
- 2004, 3rd Lu Xun Literature Prize in excellent prose and Essays for Jia Pingwa’s Lengthy Prose Selection.
  - Published in September 2003 by Shaanxi People's Publishing House.
- 2006, Hong Kong The Dream of the Red Chamber Award: The World's Distinguished Novel in Chinese" for Shaanxi Opera.
- 2006 June 24, he won the Outstanding Achievement Award from Liu Qing Literature Prize.
- 2007 September 20, 1st Pu Songling Literature Short Story Prize for Dumpling Restaurant.
- 2008, 7th Mao Dun Literature Prize for Shaanxi Opera.
  - This novel was first published in the literary magazine Harvest, the book was first published by Writers Publishing House.
