= CN Times Books =

CN Times Books is the U.S. publishing subsidiary of Beijing MediaTime Books Co. LTD, a leading Chinese trade publisher and distributor.

Their parent company publishes over 600 books a year in a full range of content fields, with titles in fiction, nonfiction, books for children, and titles of scholarly and academic interest. Beijing MediaTime Books was founded in 2008 by Chinese businessman George Daping Zhu, and also operates two distribution companies. Since it was founded, it has expanded into a $50 million business that reaps $6 million annual profit. That represents a 0.4% share of China's $12 billion books market. The publisher considers itself to be a bridge between the Eastern and Western World. Their first book, China Threat? was published in July 2013, and will be followed by more than 20 books in 2013 alone. It works directly with Ingram Publisher Services as a content distributor.
