= The Day the Sun Died =

2015 novel by Yan Lianke

- First edition cover (Taiwan)
- Author: Yan Lianke
- Audio read by: Graham Halstead
- Original title: 日熄; Rìxī
- Translator: Carlos Rojas
- Language: Chinese
- Publisher: Rye Field Publishing
- Publication date: 26 December 2015
- Publication place: Taiwan
- English publication date: 2018
- Media type: Print
- Pages: 322
- ISBN: 978-9863442981
- Dewey Decimal: 895.13/52
- LC Class: PL2925.L54 R52713 2018

The Day the Sun Died (Chinese: 日熄; pinyin: Rìxī; lit. 'The Dimming Sun') is a 2015 novel by Yan Lianke, published in Taiwan. Carlos Rojas translated the book into English, and the translation was published in 2018 by Grove.

The novel's events occur in a place called Gaotian, in June, within the span of twenty-four hours, starting at 5 PM, going through the nighttime, with the morning occurring at the end of the book. Li Niannian, a 14-year old boy, narrates the novel. His uncle owns a mortuary. His father Tianbao, who makes funerary wreaths, is involved with hiding oil generated from dead bodies instead of allowing it to be sent to factories.

During the novel many residents of Niannian's village suffer from somnambulism. Niannian knows Yan Lianke, who appears in the novel and also suffers from somnambulism in addition to writer's block. Over 500 deaths occur as the sufferers lack inhibition and wish to right perceived wrongs inflicted by others. Since the government promotes cremation over burial, Niannian's uncle gains a lot of money.

The narrative keeps track of each hour passing.

== Characters ==
Niannian is often called "stupid Niannian" (Sha Niannian), although his uncle chooses not to do so. James Kidd of the South China Morning Post stated that Niannian "makes an engaging, if unlikely narrator" who has "unadorned" words that belie "complex layers" from a "rhythmic and heavily metaphorical style". Niannian likes to quote the fictional Yan Lianke's works, but he often gets the quotes wrong. The actual Yan Lianke stated that a teenager would have been more believable than a "very switched-on adult" in a role that needed "a certain element of randomness and unpredictability", so he chose to make Niannian a teenager. He also stated that "a very innocent, very pure voice" was useful in criticizing modern Chinese society.

== Reception ==
In 2016 it won the Dream of the Red Chamber Award.

Seán Hewitt of the Irish Times called it "a brave", "masterful", and "unforgettable novel" that is "poetic, both in structure and imagery." Hewitt stated that sometimes parts of the translation seemed "clunky".

Allan Mas of The Scotsman stated that it is a "remarkable novel" which readers can interpret however they wish.

Kidd ranked the book five of five stars.

Publishers Weekly stated that the book "is a riveting, powerful reading experience."

Kirkus Reviews stated that the book "belongs in the company of Juan Rulfo's Pedro Páramo and even James Joyce's Ulysses." It received the Kirkus Reviews "The Best Books of 2018" Fiction Award.
