= Wu He (writer) =

Taiwanese writer (born 1951)

- 舞鶴
- Born: October 13, 1951 (age 74); Chiayi, Taiwan
- Other name: Chen Guocheng
- Education: National Cheng Kung University (BA)
- Occupations: Novelist, short story writer

Chen Kuo-cheng (Chinese: 陳國城; born October 13, 1951), better known by his pen name Wu He (Chinese: 舞鶴; lit. dancing crane) is a Taiwanese writer from Chiayi.

== Life and career ==
Chen graduated from National Cheng Kung University with a Bachelor of Arts in Chinese literature in 1975.

In the mid to late 1970s, Chen Guocheng published his first three short stories, using the pen name Chen Jinghua. "Peony Autumn" appeared in 1974, winning him the National Cheng Kung University (NCKU) Flame Tree Literary Award, after which he graduated from the Department of Chinese Literature at NCKU in 1975. "A Thin Incense Stick" was published in 1978 and "Past Events" in 1979.

In 1981, after completing his compulsory military service, he moved to the Tamsui District for ten years, which he has described as "ten years in isolation where I cut myself off from society to read, write, and take walks".

He returned to Chiayi in 1991 and began to publish again, adopting the pen name Wu He for short stories such as "The Second Brother Deserter" (written in 1985, but not published until 1991), "Investigate: Narrate" (1992), "Digging for Bones" (1993) and "Sorrow" (1994).

After publishing two collections of short stories and a novel, in early 2000 Wu He published his most well known book, Remains of Life, in which the narrator is investigating the Musha Incident of 1930. It won several literary awards.

== Selected bibliography ==
- 《拾骨》 (1995, short stories). Digging for Bones or Disinterment
- 《十七歲之海》 (1997, short stories). The Sea at Seventeen
- 《思索阿邦．卡露斯》 (1997, novel). Thinking of Abang Kadresengan
- 《餘生》 (2000, novel). Remains of Life, trans. Michael Berry (Columbia University Press, 2017)
- 《鬼兒與阿妖》 (2000, novel). Queer and Ayao
- 《悲傷》 (2001, short stories). Sorrow
- 《舞鶴淡水》 (2002, novel). Wu He Danshui
- 《亂迷》 (2007). Chaos and Confusion

== Awards and honours ==
- 1974: National Cheng Kung University Flame Tree Literary Award, for "Peony Autumn"
- 1992: Wu Chuo-liu Literary Award, for "The Second Brother Deserter"
- 1995: Loa Ho Literature Award, for "Sorrow"
- 1997: China Times Literature Awards, Recommended, for Thinking of Abang Kadresengan
- 2000: Taipei Creative Writing Award for Literature, for Remains of Life
- 2000: China Times Ten Best Books of the Year Award, for Remains of Life
- 2000: United Daily Readers' Choice Award, for Remains of Life
