= Xu Zidong =

Chinese literary critic

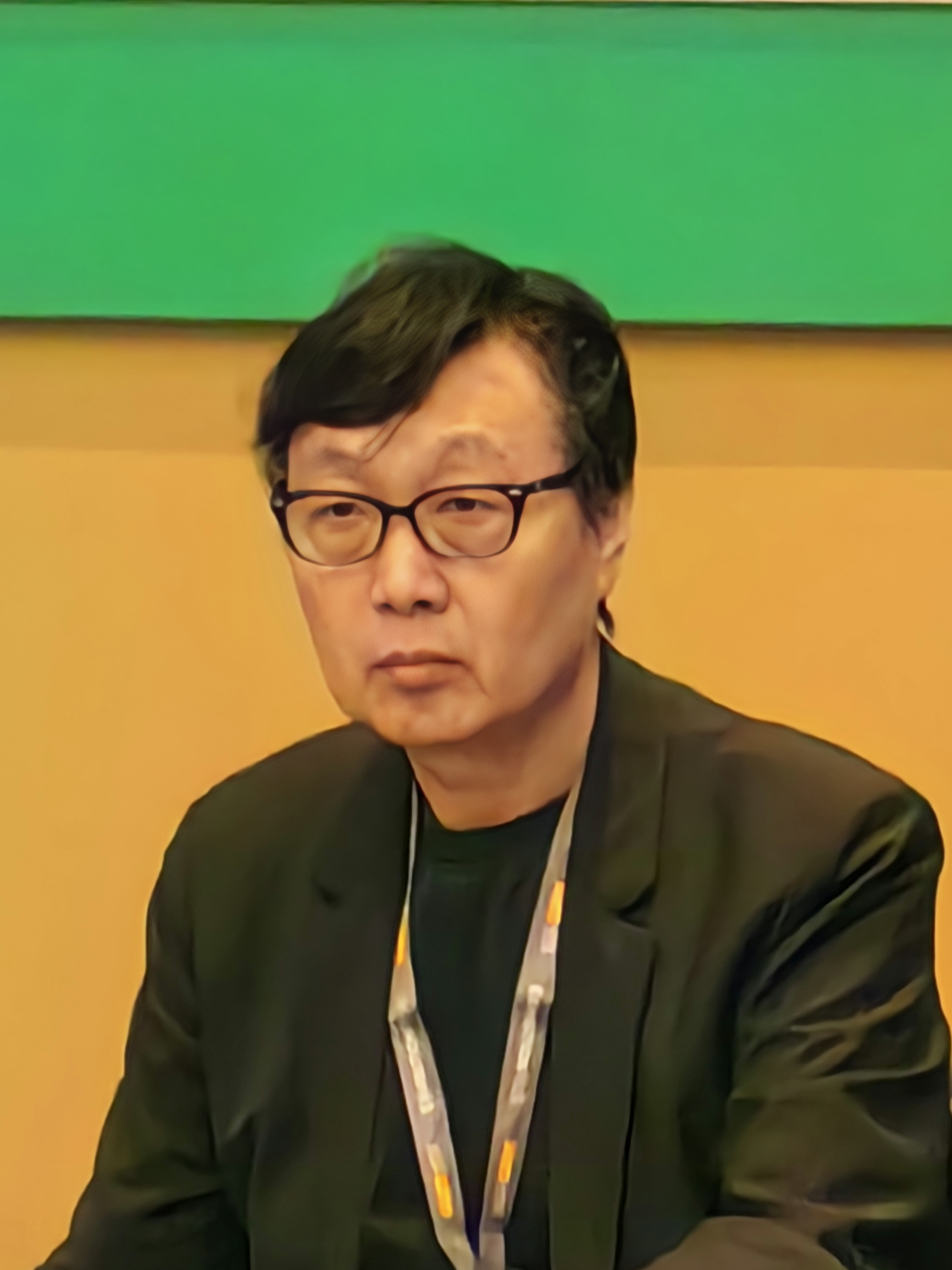
- Born: 21 August 1954 (age 72)
- Education: East China Normal University; University of California, Los Angeles; University of Hong Kong
- Scientific career
- Fields: Literary Criticism
- Workplaces: East China Normal University; Fudan University; Lingnan University; Peking University; University of Hong Kong
- Thesis: Narratives of the "Cultural Revolution" in contemporary Chinese fiction (《当代小说中的文革叙事》) (1997)
- Doctoral advisor: Lee Ou-fan

Xu Zidong
- Traditional Chinese: 許子東
- Simplified Chinese: 许子东
Transcriptions
Standard Mandarin
- Hanyu Pinyin: Xǔ Zǐdōng
- Wade–Giles: Hsu Tzu-tung
Yue: Cantonese
- Yale Romanization: Hsu Tzu Tung

Xu Zidong (许子东; born 21 August 1954) is a Chinese literary historian, critic and academic. He is currently a visiting professor at East China Normal University and Honorary Professor at the School of Chinese, University of Hong Kong (2020 to 2026). He was Professor Emeritus of Chinese at Lingnan University and served as chair of the Department of Chinese from 2008 to 2014. He was a visiting professor at University of Hong Kong as of the 2021–22 academic year. He has written extensively on 20th-century Chinese literature, Hong Kong Literature, cultural studies, and Cultural Revolution literature studies.

He specializes in the works of Yu Dafu and Eileen Chang.

He is a vice president of Chinese Association of Literary and Art Theory (中国文艺理论学会), a member of China Writers Association and Shanghai Writers' Association.

== Life and career ==
Born in Shanghai to a middle-class family where his father is a surgeon and mother's family runs a brewery business, Xu has 3 elder half-brothers and his father changed surname to Fan (范) as a foster child but younger generation kept the old family name. As a child, Xu lived in Chonghua New Village, on western Nanjing Road, in Shanghai's main business and shopping district. During the Cultural Revolution, Xu was sent to Guangchang, Jiangxi, where he performed manual rural labor from 1970 to 1976. He returned to Shanghai in 1976 and sat for Gaokao in 1977. Despite achieving passing scores, he was denied admission due to systemic hurdles.

Xu worked briefly as a steel plant worker before enrolling as a Master's student in East China Normal University under Qian Gurong (钱谷融). He wrote a course essay on Yu Dafu on the second month into the course, which was then published in the university's Gazette. The work was later expanded into a monograph as New Opinion on Yu Dafu (郁达夫新论), cementing his status as a rising academic.

After graduation, he was offered a teaching position by East China Normal University and was shortly promoted to associate professor at the age of 28, the youngest in Shanghai alongside Wang Huning, who taught politics at Fudan University at the time.

In 1987, Xu travelled to Hong Kong under a fellowship, where he met Professor Lee Ou-fan, who later invited him to the United States as a visiting scholar.

Xu studied at University of Chicago for a year and continued his PhD in East Asian Studies at UCLA. His focused research on Eileen Chang was done at UCLA. He moved back to Hong Kong in 1993 before completing his PhD as a vacancy had arisen in the Department of Chinese at Lingnan University. He finished his doctoral studies at the University of Hong Kong under Lee Ou-fan. He later succeeded Lau Shiu-ming as the Head of the Department of Chinese at Lingnan in 2008; he stepped down as departmental head in 2014.

In 2020, Xu returned to East China Normal as an honorary lecturer. In 2021, Xu returned to the University of Hong Kong as a guest lecturer on 20th Century Chinese literature. As of 2021, Xu retired from Lingnan and was appointed a senior scholar by Lingnan.

Xu is also a frequent public lecturer and commentator on TV, radio, and podcasts.

Xu considered his research into Cultural Revolution literature to be pivotal. He maintained that the movement's legacy has permeated the Chinese psyche, even as collective memory of the era has been deliberately blurred. He believed it remains critical for the nation to reflect upon the absurdity and cruelty of the movement to counteract its lingering toxicity within the minds of younger generations.

== Major publications ==
Xu's works include monographs, essay collections, and edited anthologies:

- New Opinion on Yu Dafu (郁达夫新论, 1984)
- Impressions of Contemporary Literature (当代文学印象, 1987)
- Reading Notes on Contemporary Fiction (当代小说阅读笔记, 1997)
- Contemporary Fiction and Collective Memory: Narrating the Cultural Revolution (当代小说与集体记忆：叙述文革, 2000; also published as For the Collective Memory of Forgetting: Interpreting 50 Cultural Revolution Novels, 为了忘却的集体记忆——解读五十篇文革小说, 2000)
- Outcries and Rumors (呐喊与流言, 2004)
- An Initial Exploration of Hong Kong Short Fiction (香港短篇小说初探, 2005; winner of Hong Kong Chinese Literature Biennial Award in Literary Criticism)
- The Literary Historical Significance of Eileen Chang (张爱玲的文学史意义, 2011)
- Selected Works of Xu Zidong (许子东讲稿, 3 volumes, 2011)
- Rereading 20th-Century Chinese Fiction (重读二十世纪中国小说, 2021)
- Close Readings of Eileen Chang (细读张爱玲, 2019)
- Anthology of Xu Zidong (许子东文集, 10-volume set, Ideal Country Publishing, 2025 onward; volumes released include expanded editions on Eileen Chang, Lu Xun, collective memory of the Cultural Revolution, Hong Kong fiction, and 20th/21st-century Chinese novels).

== TV Personality ==
Xu was first invited by Cao Jingxing (曹景行) in 1998 to participate in the Phoenix TV talk show Behind Headlines with Wen Tao(锵锵三人行); however, he declined the offer, prioritizing his academic and teaching responsibilities. He was advised by his wife, former Shanghai TV hostess Chen Yanhua to learn more about the program before making a decision. In 2000, Xu was invited by Leung Man-tao again to sit in for a "casual chat". Xu has since become a frequent guest to the show until its end in 2017. Xu, Leung, and the host Dou Wentao were considered the Golden Trio of the program. As of 2017, when the show ceased production, he appeared on the show 1313 times, more than any other guests.

== Filmography ==
=== Film ===
| Year | English title | Chinese title | Role | Notes |
|---|---|---|---|---|
| 2020 | Love After Love | 第一炉香 | Rich Merchant | Cameo |

=== TV ===
| Year | English title | Chinese title | Role | Notes |
|---|---|---|---|---|
| 2000-2017 | Behind the Headlines With Wen Tao | 锵锵三人行 | Guest | Most guest appearances with 1313 episodes |
| 2016-2020 | Letters Alive | 见字如面 | Pundit | Seasons 1-4 |
| 2016- | Roundtable π | 圆桌派 | Guest | |
| 2017 | Travel with Book | 一路书香 | Guest | |
| 2018-2021 | Travel the World with Wen Tao | 锵锵行天下 | Guest | Spinoff of Behind the Headlines With Wen Tao |
