= Serve the People =

Chinese Communist Party political slogan

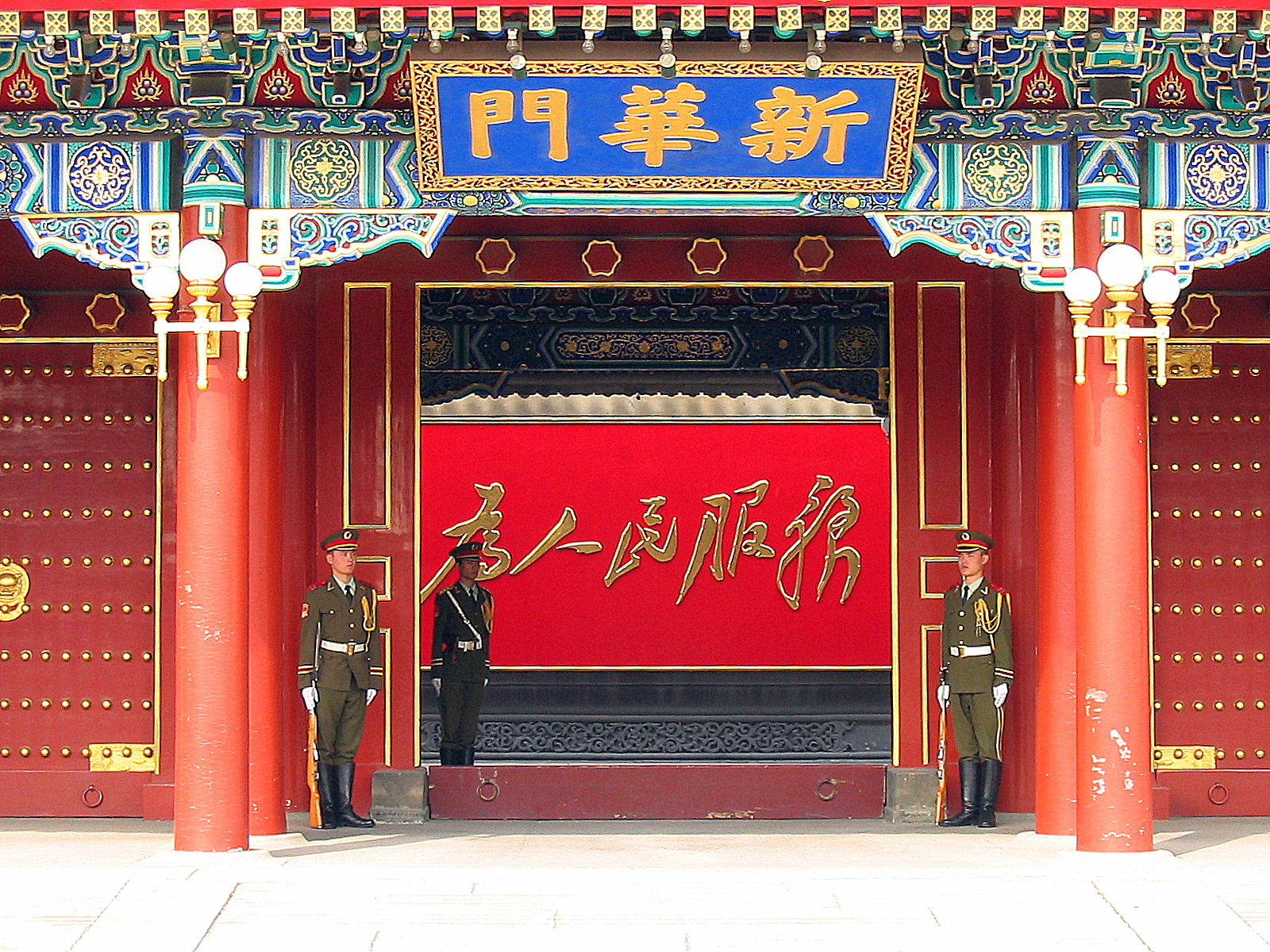
- The inscription of the slogan displayed at the entrance of Xinhua Gate in front of Zhongnanhai, handwritten by Mao Zedong
- Traditional Chinese: 為人民服務
- Simplified Chinese: 为人民服务
Transcriptions
Standard Mandarin
- Hanyu Pinyin: wèi rénmín fúwù

"Serve the People" is a political slogan and the motto of the Chinese Communist Party (CCP), originating from the title of a speech by Mao Zedong, delivered in September 1944.

The slogan became popular in the United States due to the strong Maoist influence on the New Left, especially among the Red Guard Party, the Black Panther Party, and the Yellow Brotherhood of West Los Angeles.

== Development ==
Mao Zedong wrote the speech Serve the People to commemorate the death of a PLA soldier, Zhang Side, a participant in the Long March who died in the collapse of a kiln when he worked in Shaanxi province. In the speech, Mao quoted a phrase written by the famous Han dynasty historian Sima Qian: "Though death befalls all men alike, it may be heavy as Mount Tai or light as a feather". Mao continued: "To die for the people is weightier than Mount Tai, but to work for the fascists and die for the exploiters and oppressors is lighter than a feather."

The speech, delivered on 8 September 1944, states that the CCP and the People's Liberation Army have no other goal than to serve the people. It states that the CCP and its cadres should not be afraid of criticism, and if criticism is correct, they should accept it and revise their behavior accordingly. It also states that everyone in the revolutionary ranks is equal regardless of title or position. Mao noted, "all people in the revolutionary ranks must care for each other."

The speech ends with a call to mourn "anyone in our ranks who has done useful work, be he soldier or cook."

The phrase "serve the people" became rhetorically important and subsequently appeared in important texts of Chinese Marxism including On the Correct Handling of Contradictions among the People.

Our Communist Party and the Eighth Route and New Fourth Armies led by our Party are battalions of the revolution. These battalions of ours are wholly dedicated to the liberation of the people and work entirely in the people's interests. Comrade Chang Szu-teh was in the ranks of these battalions.

All men must die, but death can vary in its significance. The ancient Chinese writer Szuma Chien said, "Though death befalls all men alike, it may be weightier than Mount Tai or lighter than a feather." To die for the people is weightier than Mount Tai, but to work for the fascists and die for the exploiters and oppressors is lighter than a feather. Comrade Chang Szu-teh died for the people, and his death is indeed weightier than Mount Tai.

If we have shortcomings, we are not afraid to have them pointed out and criticized, because we serve the people. Anyone, no matter who, may point out our shortcomings. If he is right, we will correct them. If what he proposes will benefit the people, we will act upon it. The idea of "better troops and simpler administration" was put forward by Mr. Li Ting-ming, who is not a Communist. He made a good suggestion which is of benefit to the people, and we have adopted it. If, in the interests of the people, we persist in doing what is right and correct what is wrong, our ranks will surely thrive.

— Mao Zedong, Memorial meeting for Comrade Zhang Side, September 8, 1944,

== Mao era ==
During the Third Front campaign to develop basic industry and national defense industry in China's interior, Serve the People was frequently assigned as reading for Third Front workers.

During the Cultural Revolution, the speech was widely read and people were encouraged to memorize it. Its messages had the effect of serving as a code of conduct which ordinary people could use to hold officials accountable.

=== Outside China ===
The slogan became popular in the United States due to the strong Maoist influence on the New Left, especially among the Red Guard Party, the Black Panther Party, and the Yellow Brotherhood of West Los Angeles.

== Contemporary uses ==
The slogan of serving the people reflects the influence of the Maoist principle of the mass line.

The speech Serve the People was among the texts which all Party cadres were required to study in 2005-2006 through the "Maintain the Advanced Nature of the Communist Party" campaign implemented by Hu Jintao.

=== Ceremonial role ===
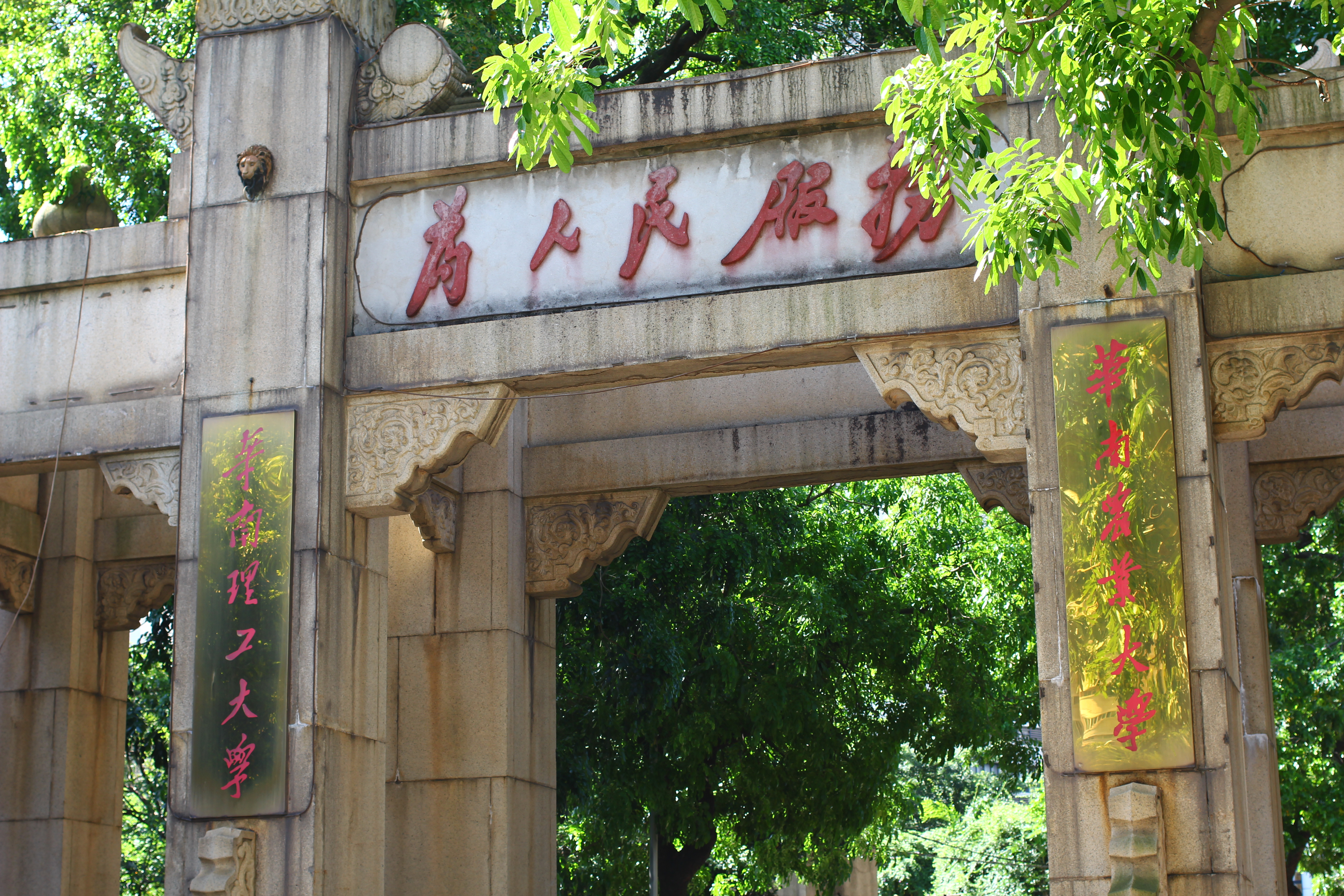
The slogan displayed at Sun Yat-sen University

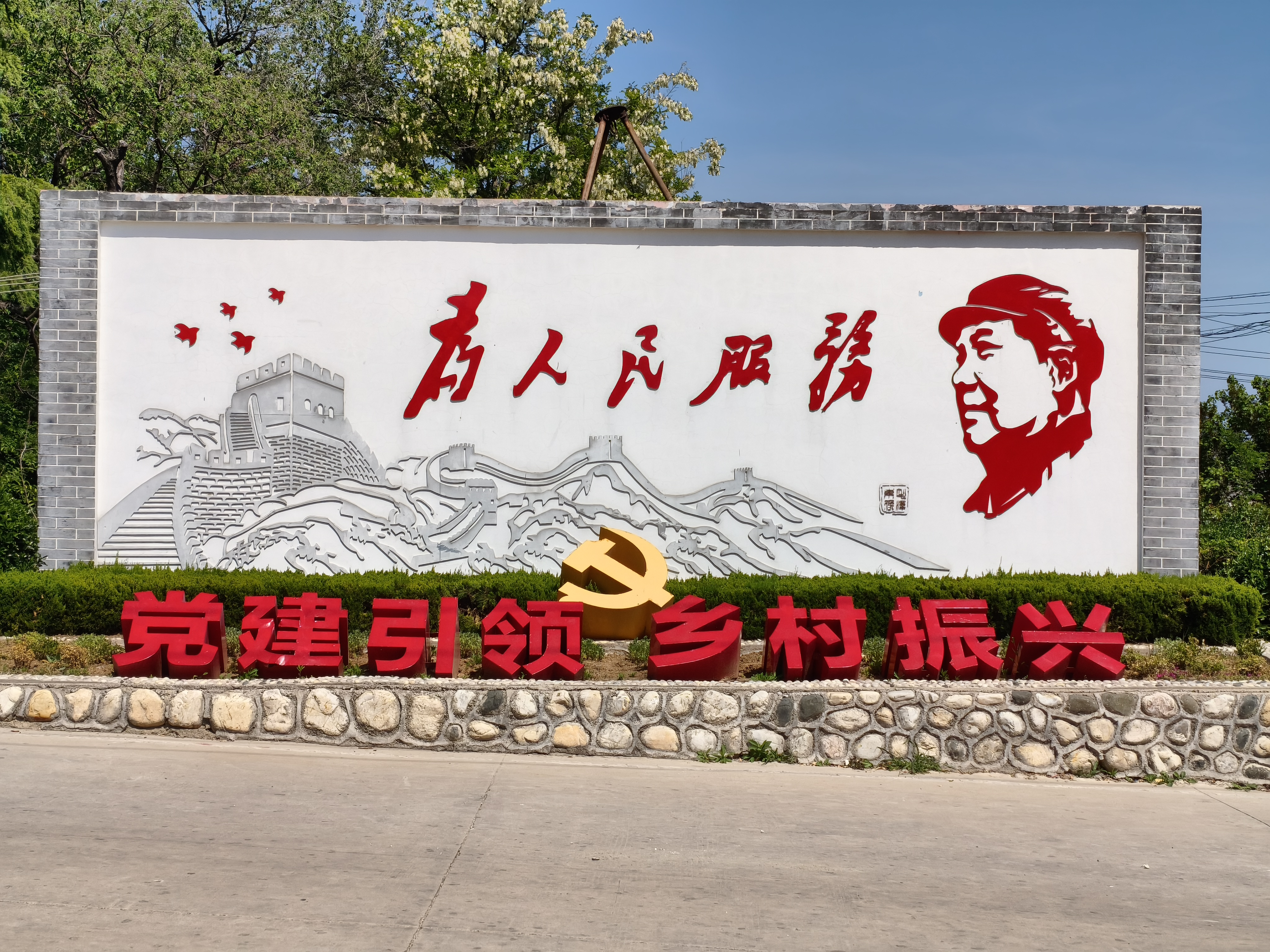
A slogan in Nanzhuang Village, Changdao, Shandong. There is also a portrait of Mao Zedong on this wall.

The slogan is inscribed in the calligraphy of Mao himself, on the screen wall facing the front entrance of the Zhongnanhai compound, which serves as the headquarters for the senior party leadership and houses the offices of the General Secretary, Politburo Standing Committee and the State Council, together composing the most powerful offices in the PRC.

Since 1984, during inspections of troops in the People's Liberation Army, the following ceremonial exchange is carried out:

Inspecting official: "Hello, Comrades!" (同志们好; tóng zhì men hǎo)
Troops: "Greetings, Chief [or Chairman]!" (Note: The greeting 首长好 ("Greetings, Chief!") was traditionally used by all leaders during troop inspections since Chairman Mao's era. However, since 2017, a distinguished 主席好 ("Greetings, Chairman!") has been used when Chairman of the Central Military Commission Xi Jinping is inspecting.) (首长 [主席] 好; shǒu zhǎng [zhǔ xí] hǎo)
Inspecting official: "Comrades, you have worked hard!" (同志们辛苦了; tóng zhì men xīn kǔ le!)
Troops: "[We] Serve the people!" (为人民服务!; wèi rén mín fú wù!)

=== Cultural role ===
In 2007, actress Cameron Diaz caused a minor controversy by carrying a bag with the "Serve the People" slogan in Chinese on a tour of Peru. Many Peruvians felt the bag to be a show of support for the Maoist movement Shining Path.

In 2005, author Yan Lianke wrote a satirical novel set during the Cultural Revolution titled Serve the People! about an affair between the wife of a military officer and a peasant soldier.

Huawei founder and CCP member Ren Zhengfei states that Huawei's culture is the same as the CCP's culture, "and to serve the people wholeheartedly means to be customer-centric and responsible to society." The conglomerate Hengtong Group characterizes its business mission as "Serve the people and devote to the society," also a reference to Mao's speech.

== See also ==
- Servant of the People
- Community service
- Median voter theorem
- Public service
- Volunteerism
- Three Old Articles (China)
