= Zhang Side =

Chinese soldier

- 张思德
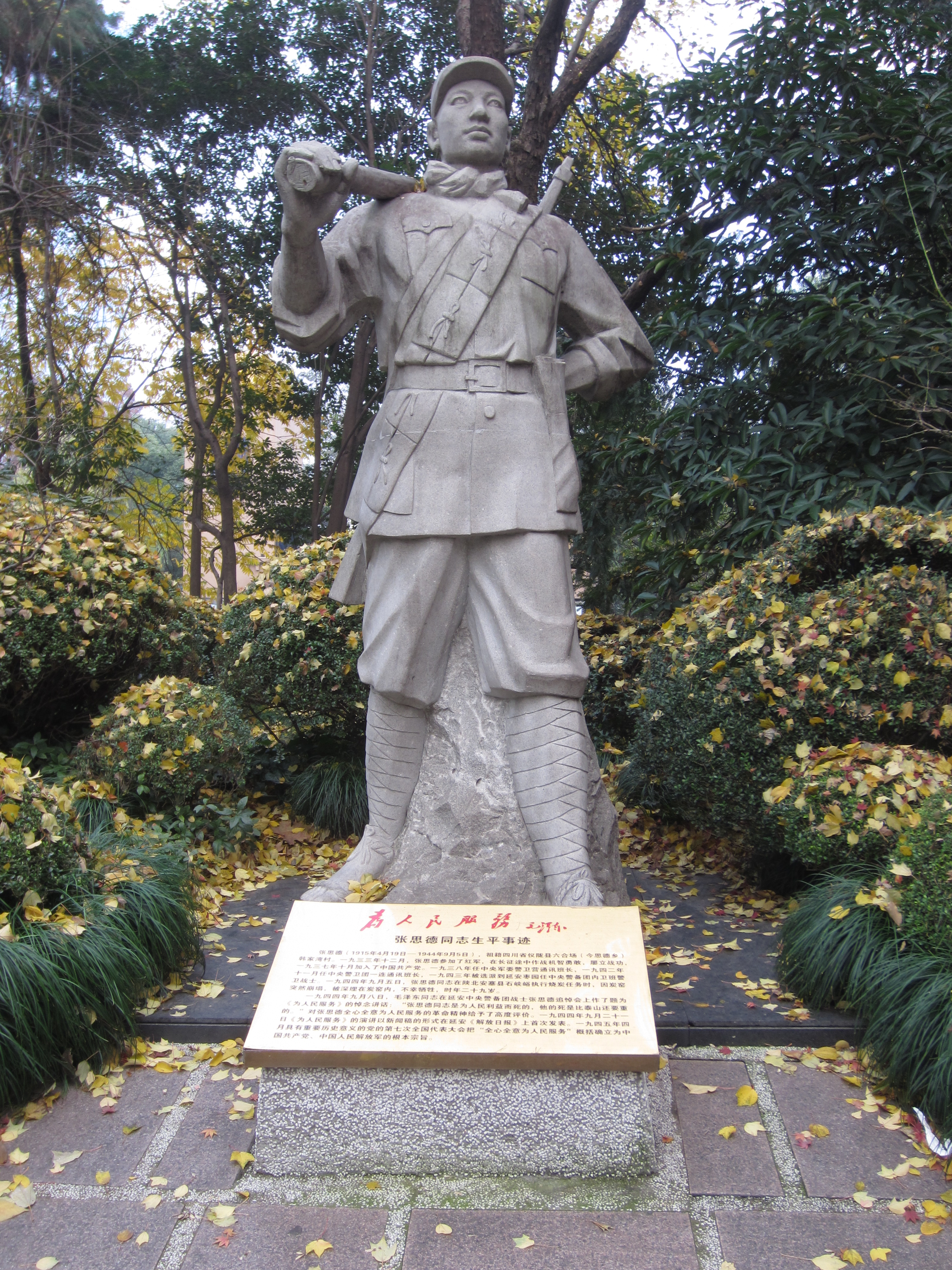
- A statue of Zhang Side in People's Park, Shanghai.
- Born: April 19, 1915; Yilong County, Sichuan, China
- Died: September 5, 1944 (aged 29)
- Cause of death: Mine collapse, accidental death
- Military career
- Allegiance: Chinese Communist Party
- Branch: Chinese Red Army
- Service years: 1933 - 1944

Zhang Side (simplified Chinese: 张思德; traditional Chinese: 張思德; pinyin: Zhāng Sīdé; Wade–Giles: Chang^{1} Ssu^{1}-Te^{2}; April 19, 1915 – September 5, 1944) was a Chinese Communist soldier and guard for Mao Zedong. Zhang was killed during the collapse of a charcoal kiln after rescuing two other workers. Mao attended Zhang's funeral and wrote his famous serve the people doctrine as Zhang's eulogy.

== Life ==
Zhang Side was born in a poor tenant-peasant family of Hanjiawan, Liuhechang, Yilong County, Sichuan Province on April 19 (the sixth day of third lunar month), 1915. Before he was one year old, his mother died. He was brought up by his aunt. When he was 12 years old, he began to feed the cattle and mow grasses for the landlord. In September 1933, the Red Army came to his hometown and established the revolutionary regime. He actively joined the Young Pioneers of China and was elected a team leader. He was conscientious in assisting the Red Army and militia in standing guard, then searching suspected people. He joined the Red Army in December 1933 and before long the Communist Youth League of China.

In October 1937, he joined the Chinese Communist Party (CCP). In a fight against the six-side siege, his legs were injured twice but he still rushed into the enemy's position to capture two machine guns. In June 1935, the 4th Front Red Army joined force with the Central Red Army in Maogong of Sichuan and continued to march north. During the Long March, he had crossed the snow mountains and grasslands two times.

After he arrived in Northern Shaanxi, he was selected as leader of the Communication squad of the Guard Battalion of the Central Military Commission. For several years, he worked hard and outstandingly fulfilled his duties.

In the early summer of 1940, the Kuomintang carried out the military "encirclements" and economic blockades in the border areas. To resolve the heating problem of the central organs in winter, he led his squad to burn charcoals in Tuhuanggou north to Yan'an. After three months of hard work, he successfully delivered 40 tons of charcoals to Yan'an.

In 1941, the Second Sino-Japanese War came into the hardest period. In order to get over the economic difficulty of enemy's blockade, he opened up a wasteland in Nanniwan along with the guard battalion. He led the squad to overcome many difficulties during that period and complete production tasks given by the superior. Meanwhile, he also shouldered the communication work as usual, working hard at day and sending message on foot at night regardless of fatigue for the sake of fulfilling the task of communication.

In the winter of 1942, he returned to Yan'an from Nanniwan.

In early summer of 1943, he was transferred to Zaoyuan Internal Guard Squad. He was one of the guards for Mao.

Zhang responded to Mao's call to engage in industrial and agricultural production in Shaanxi province. In 1944, the CCP organization assigned him to burn charcoal in Ansai County. One day, Zhang and two others were working in a charcoal kiln that collapsed. Zhang was able to save the two other workers but was killed.

== Use in CCP propaganda ==
In the afternoon of September 8, 1944, the organs directly under the CCP Central Committee held a grand funeral ceremony, at which Chairman Mao Zedong inscribed the elegiac words of "salute to Comrade Zhang Side who sacrifices his life for the benefit of people" and attended the funeral ceremony in person. At the ceremony, Mao Zedong made the important speech of Serve the People, highly praising his lofty morality of serving the people wholeheartedly that he "died for the benefit of people, and his death is indeed heavier than Mount Tai". Mao Zedong said in the eulogy:

"All men must die, but death can vary in its significance. The ancient Chinese writer Szuma Ch'ien (Sima Qian) said, "Though death befalls all men alike, it may be weightier than Mount Tai or lighter than a feather." [...] From now on, when anyone in our ranks who has done some useful work dies, be he soldier or cook, we should have a funeral ceremony and a memorial meeting in his honor. This should become the rule. And it should be introduced among the people as well. When someone dies in a village, let a memorial meeting be held. In this way we express our mourning for the dead and unite all the people".

This speech later became the focal point of CCP propaganda that is still used to this day.

== See also ==
- Lei Feng
- Dong Cunrui
