= Hong Kong literature =

Hong Kong literature is 20th-century and subsequent writings from or about Hong Kong or by writers from Hong Kong, primarily in the poetry, performance, and fiction media. Hong Kong literature reflects the area's unique history during the 20th century as a fusion of British colonial, Cantonese, and sea-trading culture. It has mainly been written in Vernacular Chinese and, to a lesser extent, English.

== Genres ==
Hong Kong fiction and performance (including Cantonese opera, television, plays, and film) are many and varied, though only a few film and theatrical works were widely known internationally until the late 20th and early 21st century. Hong Kong's wuxia (Jyutping: mou^{5} hap^{6}) martial arts fiction is one of Hong Kong's most famous exports, and provided many internationally recognised films and televisions programmes during the latter half of the 20th century, almost single-handedly bringing Hong Kong literature out of relative obscurity towards a global audience.

== Development ==
Many modern vernacular Chinese publications in Hong Kong have their origins in Chinese writers who fled from Communist and Nationalist fighting during the Chinese Civil War. A significant number of Chinese intellectuals and artists moved to Hong Kong between 1927 and 1937. Many of these people viewed themselves as outsiders in the Hong Kong community, and often wrote of the "barbaric" and "strange" practices of the southern Chinese people (a view evident even in the Tang dynasty). A second wave of writers came to Hong Kong in 1949 after the Chinese Communist Party's victory in the Chinese Civil War and the establishment of the People's Republic of China. While some in this second wave expressed the intention to "Northernise" Hong Kong, many of them began to recognise the valuable traditions that existed in local Hong Kong culture, and their efforts to preserve these traditions helped shape Hong Kong's literary landscape.

Because Hong Kong was a British colony for nearly all of the 20th century, it was spared the harsh censorship that the People's Republic of China and Taiwan endured at the hands of their political leaders. Hong Kong's literature and arts developed quite freely throughout the 20th century. After 1950, two general literary trends took form: the first, dubbed the "Greenback Culture" (Chinese: 綠背文化) sought to make itself appealing to contemporary American culture and consumers; the second, called the "Left Wing" (Chinese: 左翼), opposed the "Greenback" style. Hong Kong literature flourished domestically under these two different styles.

=== Mainland Chinese writers ===
Until 1950, modern literature in Hong Kong was dominated by writers who had fled fighting in northern China, and vestiges of their influence were still present in Hong Kong literature until around 1970. These writers fell into three main categories:

1. Newspaper and periodical editors: Maa Long, who edited "New Tides of Literature and Art" (Chinese: 文藝新潮), Huang Sicheng, who edited "Everyone's Humanities" (Chinese: 人人文學), and others, all were able to bring hitherto unknown information on Western literature to a Hong Kong audience, as well as providing a medium for local writers to publish their works.
2. Professors and teachers: teachers of literature encouraged research among their students and were often writers themselves. Author Xu Dishan, who taught at Hong Kong University, is the most famous of these.
3. Younger, radical writers: the works of Eileen Chang and Lau Yee Cheung challenged traditional structures in Hong Kong literature and showed aspects of Hong Kong life and society that were often either not treated or even taboo.

== Hong Kong literature in English ==
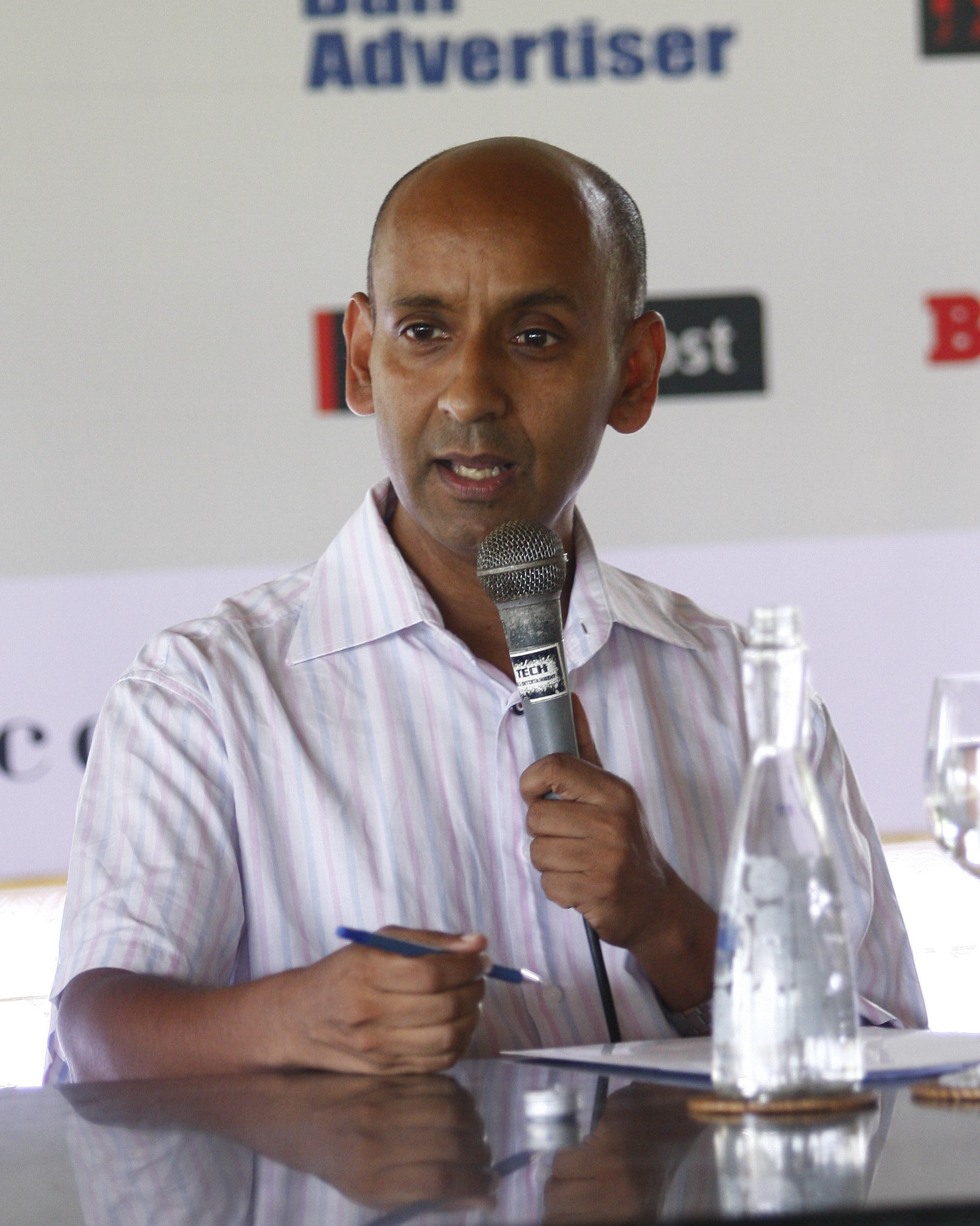
Nury Vittachi

In addition to Vernacular Chinese writing, there is also a smaller body of literature in English. Notable Hong Kong English language writers include Xu Xi, Stewart Sloan, Nury Vittachi, Colin McAdam, Rebecca Bradley, Larry Feign and Alan Jefferies.

== Hong Kong authors ==
Essay and fiction
- Liu Yichang (Lau Yee Cheung)
- Xiaosi (Lou Wai Lyun) (小思/盧瑋鑾)
- Xi Xi (西西)
- Ye Si (也斯)
- Dong Giao (董橋)
- Wong Bik-Wan (黃碧雲)
- Dung Kai-cheung (董啟章)
- Zung Hiu Joeng (鍾曉陽)
- Gwan Lai Saam (關麗珊)
- Chip Tsao (曹捷)
- Chua Lam (蔡瀾)
- Gu Dak Ming (古德明)
- Can Wai (陳慧)
- Hon Lai Zyu (Hon Lai-chu) (韓麗珠)
- Ze Hiu Hong (Dorothy Tse) (謝曉虹)
- Dang Siu Wa (鄧小樺)
- Albert Tam (譚劍)
- Jingan Young(楊靜安)

Modern poetry

- Gwan Naam (崑南)
- Gwan Mung Naam (關夢南)
- Yip Fai (葉輝)
- Wong Leung Wo (王良和)
- Wu Yin Ching (胡燕青)
- Hong Caan Lian (黃燦然)
- Chan Tak Kam (陳德錦)
- Wong Kwok-pun (黃國彬)
- Chung Kwok Keung (鍾國強)
- Chung Wai Man (鍾偉民)
- Liu Wai Tong (廖偉棠)
- Ng Mei Kwan (吳美筠)
- Lau Zi Wan (劉芷韻)
- Jennifer Wong (王詠思)

Martial arts fiction

- Jin Yong (金庸)
- Liang Yusheng
- Huang Yi

Science fiction

- Ni Kuang
- Lei Ngaak Soeng (李逆熵)

Professors and teachers

- Ho Zi (何紫)
- Ah Nong (阿濃)
- Zeng Gwok Gong (鄭國江)
- Bat Wah Lau
- Quenby Fung

Popular fiction

- David T.K. Wong
- Gam Ling (金鈴)
- Leung For Hing (梁科慶)
- Lilian Lee
- Yi Shu
- Amy Cheung (張小嫻)
- Eunice Lam (林燕妮)
- Zita Law (羅穎思)
- Loeng Mong Fung (梁望峰)
- Joe Nieh (倪震)
- Siu Gwok Waa (邵國華)
- Bat Wah Lau
- Jyun Siu Coeng (袁兆昌)
- Wong Ji Hing (王貽興)
- Lam Wing Sam (林詠琛)
- Kim Wong (天航)

Online writers

- Martin Oei (黃世澤)
- Eric Lik Seon Wong (黃力信)

== See also ==
- Cha: An Asian Literary Journal
- List of Hong Kong poets
- List of Hong Kong authors
