= Gabriel Tsang =

Hong Kong writer, scholar, and film critic (born 1987/1988)

- 曾繁裕
- Born: Tsang Fan-yu; 1987 or 1988 (age 37–38); Tai Po, Hong Kong
- Education: City University of Hong Kong (BBA); University of Hong Kong (MA); King's College London (PhD)
- Occupations: Writer; Scholar; Film critic
- Years active: 2021–present

Gabriel Tsang Fan-yu (Chinese: 曾繁裕; born 1987/1988) is a Hong Kong writer, scholar, and film critic. He published his first novel Stand in 2010 while he was in university, and continued to write romance novels while working as a secondary school teacher before pursuing a PhD in comparative literature at King's College London. He is currently an assistant professor at Hong Kong Baptist University and a member of the Hong Kong Film Critics Society, contributing film reviews to The News Lens.

== Early life and education ==
Tsang was born in 1987 or 1988 in Tai Po, Hong Kong. He described his academic results as "poor" except for Chinese, in which he scored an A in the Hong Kong Certificate of Education Examination. He began writing poetry to pursue a female classmate in Form 4, entering a writing contest co-hosted by Sing Tao Daily to attract her attention. To his unexpectedness, he won the championship, although his classmate had already started dating someone else. He discovered his passion for writing after the contest and began writing diaries and proses. He initially aimed to study Chinese at Hong Kong Baptist University, but due to insufficient A-Level grades, he instead studied business administration at City University of Hong Kong. He described himself as "not too interested" about business but remained passionate about writing during university, participating in various writing competitions. He wrote his first novel Stand while he was on exchange to Nanjing University in his third year and published in 2010. After graduation, Tsang taught at a secondary school and served as a writer-in-residence, during which he wrote the romance novels Low-Level Love and Silent Desire and Nothingness, inspired by his personal experiences as a teacher. He then pursued a Master of Arts and a Doctor of Philosophy in comparative literature at the University of Hong Kong and King's College London respectively.

== Career ==
Following the completion of his doctoral thesis, Tsang authored an AI-themed romantic sci-fi novel, Love in the Era of Post-human, inspired by the AlphaGo versus Ke Jie chess match, and he published the novel in 2018. Dung Kai-cheung, reviewing for Ming Pao, praised the novel's innovative approach of "attempting to explore a robot's perspective, imagining its thought processes and even emotional world"; while Lam Suet-ping of Fleurs des lettres described it as a "literary experiment" that "approached the world from a different angle, showcasing the phenomena beyond human limits". After earning his PhD, Tsang taught at Sun Yat-sen University in Guangzhou for several years, before returning to Hong Kong to teach at Hong Kong Baptist University in 2021.

In 2022, he published Three, a short romance stories and essays collection. Cheng Din-ho of P-articles praised the collection's exploration of love as more "pure" than his previous novels, noting the recurring tropes that run throughout the book emphasize "patience and tolerance in love". In 2023, Tsang received the Award for Young Artist (Literary Arts) at the Hong Kong Arts Development Awards. He joined the Hong Kong Film Critics Society around 2024 and contributed film reviews to The News Lens. He also published Chinese Educated Youth Literature: Ambivalent Bodies and Personal Literary Histories, a scholarly study on 1980s Chinese youth intellectuals, in 2024. He is currently an assistant professor in the Department of Chinese Language and Literature at HKBU, teaching prose writing and Hong Kong literature.

== Bibliography ==
Year	Title	Original title	Publisher	Ref.
2010	Stand	日日	Red Publish	
2012	Low-Level Love	低水平愛情	Red Publish	
2014	Silent Desire and Nothingness	無聲的愛慾與虛無	Wheatear Publishing	
2018	Love in the Era of Post-human	後人類時代的它們	Spicy Fish Cultural Production	
2022	Three	三	Spicy Fish Cultural Production	
2024	Chinese Educated Youth Literature: Ambivalent Bodies and Personal Literary Histories	—N/a	Routledge	
