= Yam Gong =

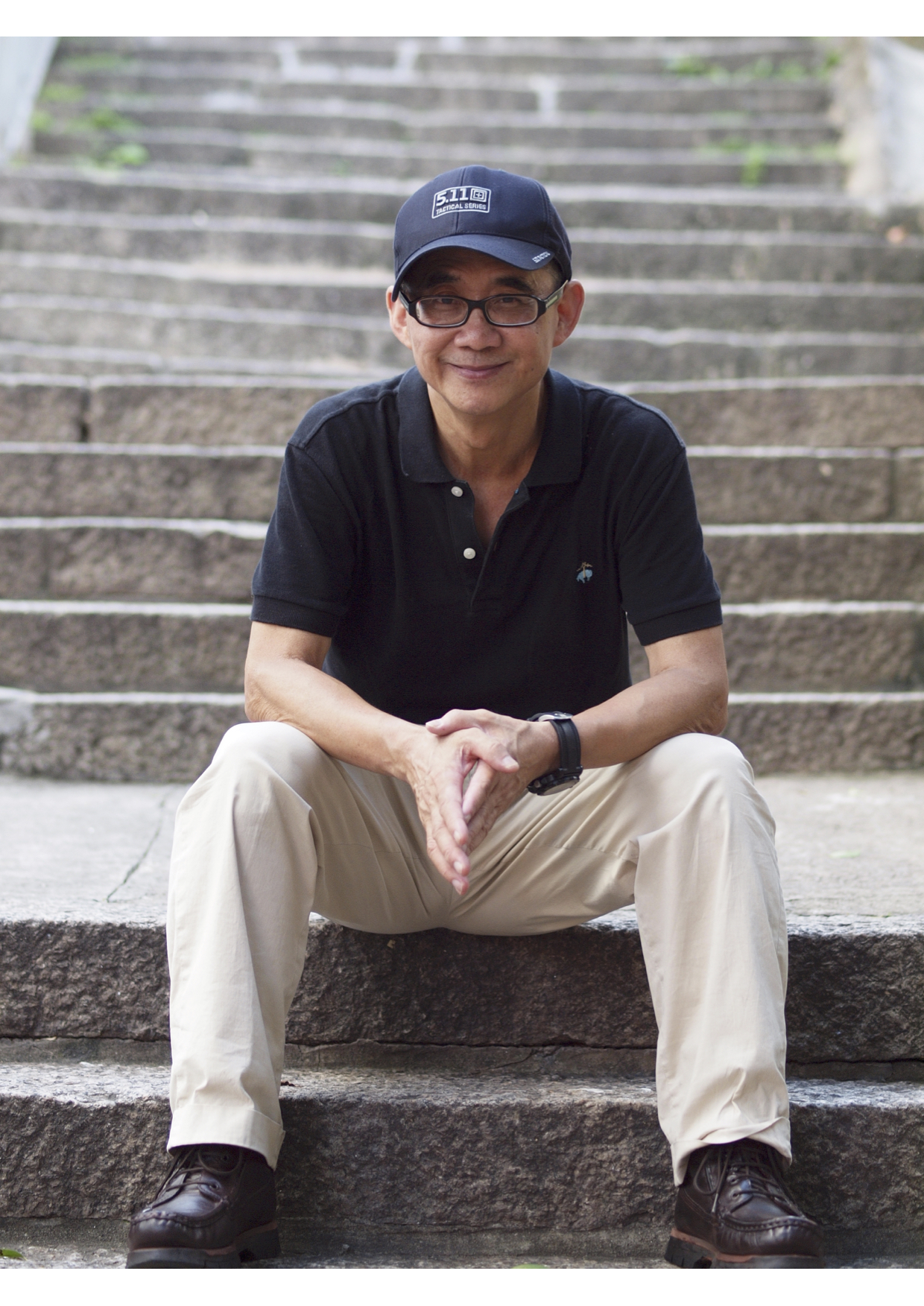
- Born: 1949 (age 76–77); Hong Kong
- Occupation: Poet

Yam Gong (Chinese: 飲江; born December 1949) is the pseudonym of the Hong Kong poet Lau Yee-ching (Chinese: 劉以正).

== Biography ==
Born in Hong Kong, Yam Gong began writing poetry in the 1970s. He has received the Hong Kong Youth Literature Award (1983) and the Workers’ Literature Award (1982; 1984), and, in 1998, he received the Hong Kong Biennial Award for Chinese Literature for his first book And So You Look at Festival Lights along the Street (1997). In 1987, he co-founded the poetry magazine One-Ninth and was involved in editing the first few issues. Lau has been appointed to the juries of several poetry awards in Hong Kong, including the Hong Kong Youth Literature Award, the Workers’ Literature Award, the Qui Ying Poetry Award and the Lee Sing-wah Modern Poetry Award. He has presented his work at various literary festivals, such as the International Poetry Nights in Hong Kong, the Macau Literary Festival, and the Taipei Poetry Festival, among others.

== Published works ==
His first book of poems, And So You Look at Festival Lights along the Street, was published in 1997. He later published an extended edition called And So Moving a Stone You Look at Festival Lights along the Street (2010), a collection of more than 130 poems.

His poems have been published in various journals in Hong Kong, including Pangu, Poetry Bi-monthly, Hong Kong Literature, Ming Pao, P-articles, and Fleurs des lettres.

Yam Gong's most recent book And So Moving a Stone (Hide-and-Seek-Peekaboo) You Look at Festival Lights along the Street《於是 搬石伏匿匿躲貓貓你沿街看節日的燈飾》(Spicy Fish Cultural Production Ltd, 2022), like his 2010 collection, is a remix of old and new works, including his whimsical pastiche of puns, repetitions, allusions to world literature and popular culture, and his latest experiments with punctuation. The physical book is a dialogue between Yam Gong and his lifelong friend ywc.lyc who designed the book and inserted handmade items for each book, turning each one into an aleatory “exhibition” of allegorical objects that resonate with Yam Gong's poetry.

A selection of Yam Gong's poems published under the name Lau Yee-ching and translated by Canaan Morse appears in the chapbook Performance Art (The Chinese University of Hong Kong Press, 2015). Moving a Stone, Selected Poems of Yam Gong (Zephyr Press, 2022) is the first book-length collection of Yam Gong's poetry translated into English. Co-translated by James Shea and Dorothy Tse, this bilingual collection includes poems that span the past forty years. In 2022, Moving A Stone: Selected Poems of Yam Gong was selected as the featured book for One City One Book Hong Kong, a community reading programme organized by The Education University of Hong Kong.

== See also ==
- List of Hong Kong poets
