= Insignificance (disambiguation) =

Insignificance is a mental or psychological state.

Insignificance may also refer to:

- Insignificance, a 1982 stage play by Terry Johnson
- Insignificance (film), a 1985 adaptation of Terry Johnson's play, directed by Nicolas Roeg
- Insignificance (Hebe Tien album) or the title song, 2013
- Insignificance (Jim O'Rourke album) or the title song, 2001
- Insignificance (Porcupine Tree album) or the title song, 1997
- "Insignificance", a song by Pearl Jam from Binaural
- Insignificance: Hong Kong Stories, a 2018 short story collection by Xu Xi
- Statistical insignificance

== See also ==
- Significance (disambiguation)
