= Muse (Hong Kong magazine) =

Hong Kong culture magazine

Muse logo

Muse (瞄) is a bilingual Hong Kong–based multimedia publisher specialising in content related to the art and culture scene of Hong Kong and greater China. Muse now concentrates on digital media, books, and specialised publishing projects, and is a developer for both Amazon.com's Kindle Store and Apple's iBookstore, Muse also maintains its own online bookstore.

Until December 2010, Muse published an award-winning monthly arts and culture magazine. It was the only art magazine to have won the Society of Publishers in Asia's Award for Editorial Excellence (local English newspaper/ magazine category) in 2008 and 2009. The magazine started publishing in February 2007 and released its last issue in December 2010.

In December 2011, Muse launched the first of a series of blogs on its web site. The bilingual blog section, labelled 'think again' (逆想), was launched with a theatre column by Winnie Chau (周潁榆), a Hong Kong theatre critic. This ongoing blog was paired with the past theatre archives from the magazine, encompassing more than 75 reviews and articles about Hong Kong theatre. In March 2012, a blog on architecture was added, authored by Sylvia Chan (陳曼霞).

== History ==
The magazine was founded by Frank Proctor, ex-general manager for Asia and international circulation director for Newsweek. Muse was originally conceived as a response to the perceived lack of cultural life and activity in Hong Kong.

Modeling itself after The New Yorker, Muse was edited by a local cinema and cultural critic, Perry Lam, and featured contributions from some of the region's foremost writers.

In the March 2008 issue, the magazine exclusively published Eileen Chang's English short story, The Spyring, on which her Chinese short story Lust, Caution, and the subsequent Ang Lee-directed movie, were based.

In the July 2008 issue, the famous Chinese-American novelist Amy Tan was invited to a tour of the Wan Chai district.

In 2008 and 2009, Muse won prizes at the Society of Publishers in Asia Editorial Awards. The 2009 "Excellence in Features Writing" award went to "It Started with a Fire," by Sylvia Chan. In 2008, the award "Excellence in Explanatory Reporting" went to "Too Close for Comfort" by Olivia Chung.

== Style ==
Although Muse was primarily written in English, Chinese elements were also included. The magazine prided itself on its unique brand of bilingualism, a feature it believed to reflect the linguistic dualism and political complexities of postcolonial Hong Kong. Lam, the magazine's Editorial Director, has likened Muse's use of English and to a jamming session between two musical traditions.

== Content ==
Each issue typically included two to three feature stories and profiles relating to the colourful cultural life and personalities of Hong Kong. Other regular content ranged from a monthly events diary to fiction and poetry, as well as reviews of concerts, cinema, books, and theatre.

Muse published the articles and columns of distinguished writers like Lung Ying-tai (龍應台), Xu Xi (許素細), and Ping Lu (平路). It ran columns by Lam Joi-Shan (林在山), and Leo Ou-fan Lee (李歐梵).

Muse also gave prominence to the visual arts, as highlighted by sections such as Muse gallery (featuring the work of local artists) and Muse tour (photo essays of different parts of Hong Kong).

== Readership ==
As of March 2008, the magazine has had 1,000 paid subscriptions and several hundred copies sold on newsstands. By late 2009, the magazine had a circulation of about 16,000 copies a month on average.

== Sponsorship ==
Muse sponsored many different arts and cultural events in Hong Kong. Most notably, it partnered with and sponsored new plays and films at organisations like the Hong Kong Arts Festival and Hong Kong International Film Festival.

In October and November 2009, Muse launched an exhibition named "Think Outside, Look Inside" with 15 renowned local artists. More than 24 art pieces were displayed at Page One bookstores. The artists included Kacey Wong, Sara Tse, Chihoi Lee and Wilson Shieh.

From Spring 2010, Muse established a Critic-in-Residence program at the University of Hong Kong. A journalist of international stature, who has an established reputation for writing critically about arts and culture, would be invited to spend a term in residence at HKU's Journalism and Media Studies Centre. The Critic-in-Residence will teach students and will also be an active participant in Hong Kong's cultural life during the residency period. The critic-in-residence for the 2010 spring semester will be Christian Caryl.

Muse also sponsored HKU's "Distinguished Lecture Series in the Humanities", which was held from September to December 2009 by Leo Lee Ou-fan, the magazine's book critic. Total attendance of the series of talks totalled approximately 1,000 people.

== The Next Big Things ==
In 2010, Muse launched its inaugural 'The Next Big Things' election. The magazine solicited public nominations for what they considered to be 'next big things' in the local arts scene: the people, concepts, ideas, projects and events which were to make the greatest positive cultural impact. On 29 June 2010, an awards ceremony was held, bestowing awards to local screenwriter Christine To Chi-long (杜緻朗), HKAPA Dean of Drama, Tang Shu-wing (鄧樹榮), and the Hong Kong Photo Festival 2010. The following year, the Muse 'Next Big Things' election was conducted entirely online, through Facebook. The winner, announced on 30 November 2011, was Hong Kong indie band my little airport, and three honourable mentions were named: theatre group FM Theatre Power (好戲量), actress Joman Chiang (蒋祖曼), and Leung Ping-kwan (也斯), an influential poet, novelist, and teacher.

== Book publishing ==
Muse began publishing books under its imprint in April 2011, with Once A Hero: The Vanishing Hong Kong Cinema a book on Hong Kong film by Perry Lam. An expert in cinema and in cultural criticism, Lam had been editorial director of Muse magazine from 2007 to 2010 before becoming assistant editorial director of Oxford University Press. Another notable book from 2011 was Musings: Reading Hong Kong, China and the World a collection of essays by renowned Harvard and Chinese University of Hong Kong scholar Leo Lee Ou-fan. A review by Louis Lee in the South China Morning Post described Musings as: “engagingly written …offers not only a self-proclaimed Chinese cosmopolitan’s view on contemporary local and world literature, but also insights into the cultural and literary scene …of interest to readers worldwide who want to understand Hong Kong culture.” The book was also reviewed in major Chinese-language media including 亞洲週刊.

In 2014, Muse published Snow and Shadow, the first full-length English book by award-winning Hong Kong author Dorothy Tse. A collection of short stories from her earlier Chinese books as well as previously unpublished works, Snow and Shadow was translated by Nicky Harman. Tse's book was the first of a series of translated works by Hong Kong writers published by Muse, which includes Hon Lai-chu and Dung Kai-cheung.

Muse has also participated in a long-term partnership with the Hong Kong Arts Festival to develop books presenting bilingual versions of plays commissioned by the Festival during 2011 to 2014. The books included both printed books and e-books. The bilingual series, New Plays Selection includes newly commissioned theatre works by Yan Yu, Harriet Chung Yin-sze, Poon Chan-leung, Wong Wing-sze, Poon Wai-sum, Santayana Li Wing-lui and Chong Mui-ngam. Particularly notable is Chong's play, Murder in San Jose, because it won the Best Script Award from the Hong Kong Federation of Drama Societies and because the English translation is adapted by David Henry Hwang, the award-winning US playwright.
