= That Man in Our Lives =

2016 novel by Xu Xi

First edition (publ. C&R Press)

That Man in Our Lives is a 2016 novel by Xu Xi. It concerns a group of characters reacting to the disappearance of a Sinophile American man who gave away his money to charity.

According to Jennifer Lee of The Asian American Literary Review, the novel "is never really about Gordie’s disappearance, but about the problem of knowledge and authority in this world of global interconnection."

== Plot ==
A different character or group of characters is the third person narrative focus on each section of the book, or an act. There are a total of five acts, with an intermission located between the third and fourth acts.

The novel's action starts with the disappearance of Gordon "Gordie" Ashberry, a wealthy bachelor. Minnie Chang (Zhang Lianhe) writes a book about Gordon after Gordon decides to donate his remaining money.

He disappears on a stopover at Narita International Airport, near Tokyo, while traveling from New York City to Hong Kong. Gordon began using a new passport with a new name, left behind his coat, passport, and wallet, and flew to Detroit. His self-imposed exile resulted in friends Harold Haight and Larry Woo and other characters to look for him. After Gordon disappears, his godson Peter goes to Hong Kong to look for Gordon while starting a study program as a cover. A subsequent chapter focuses on Minnie Chang.

== Characters ==
Jenn Lee Smith of Hyphen Magazine stated that "The main characters all seem to be highly accomplished, wealthy and/or privileged in some way", and all admire Gordon and bear "personal motivations for remembering and fawning over him". According to Jennifer Lee, the characters are "in transit between cultures and languages, sometimes resisting and sometimes embracing the legacies of their parents, their countries, their personal histories."

- Gordon "Gordie" Ashberry. Gordon, the title character, lived in Connecticut as a child, and was born to an American who was one of the Flying Tigers in World War II and his wealthy wife. Gordon had no siblings, grew up with a butler from England, had never married in his life, and had lived off of family money. Larry Woo states that Gordon is "Sino-American, which is not the same as being Chinese-American, which is what Larry is, or not, depending on your perspective." He also has a Chinese name, Hui Guo (Chinese: 灰果; pinyin: Huīguǒ), meaning "grey fruit," given to him by Larry. His other names include "Bugs Bunny," "G," "Gordon Haight Ashberry," and "Gordon Marc Ashberry", and he uses the name "Marshall Hayden" when disappearing.
  - Jennifer Lee describes Gordon as "an absent central protagonist" who "represents a certain fantasy of place which globalism has not alleviated, only complicated". Jenn Lee Smith stated that sometimes there were too many Looney Tunes references around the character.
- Larry Woo - Jenn Lee Smith stated that he had an especially close relationship with Gordon. He had received a PhD in American studies, is in a romantic relationship with a writer, and is known as his family's "weird child". He befriended Gordon as a young man on a commercial flight, where he gave Gordon his Chinese name.
- Zhang Lianhe, a.k.a. Minnie Chang and Lulabelle - A writer, she is described by Rosie Milne of the Asian Review of Books as "predatory", and by Jenn Lee Smith as "a shameless opportunist". The book Honey Money, which is published in the United States, in English, is described by Jennifer Lee as a "pop culture, gossipy book". Minnie had copied content from an essay written by a high schooler for that book. According to Jenn Smith, the reader learns her rationale and truly understands the character after reading a subsequent chapter told in another character's point of view. Lee describes Minnie's other book, written in Chinese, as "a serious examination of her alienation."
  - Jenn Lee Smith stated that Minnie was to show how first impressions could be misleading or totally incorrect, and that she was "far more believable [compared to many of the other characters] and one of the more interesting characters in the novel."
- Peter Height - Gordon's godson, he is 28 years old.
  - Jenn Lee Smith criticizes dialog from Peter that she believes is unrealistic for a man of his stated age.
- Stella - advises a government on China-United States relations. She supports the People's Republic of China even though her family had supported the historic political party of the Republic of China, the Kuomintang. She was once the fiancée of Gordon.
- X-woman - a Chinese American who originates from Hong Kong, lives in New York and writes books for a living, "X-woman" is Gordie's name for her, and she last sees him in a bar in a Hong Kong hotel. Milne states she is a "presumed avatar" of the author. The novel does not give details about their relationship.

== Reception ==
Milne wrote that That Man in Our Lives is "an ambitious, witty and generous novel, which also has enough mystery to keep even somebody with 20th-century tastes turning the pages."

Publishers Weekly stated that the "engrossing, whirlwind metafictional tale effectively demonstrates the far-reaching effects of politics and culture on the smallest, most personal aspects of our lives."
