= List of Hong Kong poets =

This is a list of Hong Kong poets, both people born in Hong Kong or residing there. The list includes both Chinese language poets and poets writing in other languages.

== Chinese language poets ==
- Natalia Chan Siu Hung
- Chen Zhide
- Huang Yunru
- Lau Tsz-wan
- Ma Lang
- Ou Waiou
- Xi Xi
- Yam Gong
- Leung Ping-kwan

== English language poets ==
- Mary Jean Chan, winner, 2019 Costa Book Award for Poetry
- Kit Fan, winner, HKU Poetry Prize 2010; winner, Times/Stephen Spender Prize 2006, finalist, The Times Literary Supplement Mick Imlah Poetry Prize 2017
- Ho-cheung Lee, founding editor, BALLOONS Lit. Journal
- Nashua Gallagher
- Sayed Gouda
- Louise Ho
- Tammy Ho Lai-Ming, winner, 2015 Hong Kong Arts Development Council Young Artist Award (Literary Arts); founding co-editor, Cha: An Asian Literary Journal
- Henrik Hoeg
- Sarah Howe, winner, 2015 T. S. Eliot Prize
- Alan Jefferies
- Akin Jeje
- Agnes Lam, Special Mention Award, 2009 Nosside International Poetry Prize
- Madeleine Marie Slavick
- Jennifer Wong, winner, 2013 Hong Kong Arts Development Council Young Artist Award (Literary Arts)
- Nicholas Wong, winner, 2016 Lambda Literary Award
- Wiency Wong, winner, 2019 Hong Kong English Poetry Competition, RTHK
- Eric Yip, winner, 2021 National Poetry Competition
- Harsh Ramchandani,
