= Vermont Studio Center =

Non-profit arts organization

- Established: 1984
- Founder: Jonathan Gregg, Frederick Osborne, Louise Von Weise
- Type: Private
- Location: 80 Pearl Street, Johnson, Vermont, United States
- Website: www.vermontstudiocenter.org

The Vermont Studio Center (VSC) is a non-profit arts organization located in the town of Johnson, Vermont. It conducts the largest fine arts and writing residency program in the United States, with a significant population of international artists in residency. The center operates two-, three- and four-week sessions throughout the year, with 20-30 visual artists and writers in residence at a time. The programs are highly selective and include a broad variety of media, cultures, and ages.

== History ==
The center was founded in 1984 by Jonathan Gregg, Frederick Osborne, and Louise Von Weise. In January 2007, George Pearlman succeeded Jonathan Gregg as VSC's executive director, and Pearlman was succeeded by long-time development director Gary Clark as president in 2013. In June 2019, Clark transitioned to President Emeritus and Ellen McCullough-Lovell stepped in as interim executive director.

In July 2020, Elyzabeth Holford was hired as executive director.

== About ==
The campus consists of twenty studio and residence buildings clustered along the Gihon River in the village of Johnson. Several of the buildings date to the nineteenth century and their restoration have won awards from the National Trust for Historic Preservation and the Preservation Trust of Vermont.

Visiting artists and writers visit the center each session. They include established writers, painters, printmakers, and sculptors. Visiting artists interact with residents on a daily basis through readings, craft talks, slide presentations and one-on-one studio visits and writing conferences.

=== Intercultural emphasis ===
The center attracts residents from more than 40 countries and all of the U.S. states. VSC fellowships emphasize intercultural exchange, and are organized around the following cultural programs: The Triangle Arts Trust Africa/Arab World; The Freeman Foundation Asian Artists; Central America; ArtNexus Latin America Artist Award; Reed Foundation Caribbean Basin Fellowships; and CEC ArtsLink Central Europe, Russia and Eurasia. Specific international fellowships focus upon Ireland, Italy, and Mexico.

Notable authors who have been granted residencies at the Vermont Studio Center include Un Sio San (Macau), Rachel Valdés (Cuba), Cherie Jones (Barbados), and Shira Erlichman (Israel).
