= P-articles =

Hong Kong online literary magazine

- Editor: Tang Siu-wa
- Frequency: Weekly (P-articles); Monthly (Formless)
- First issue: 27 May 2018; 7 years ago
- Company: The House of Hong Kong Literature
- Country: Hong Kong
- Language: Traditional Chinese
- Website: p-articles.com

P-articles (Chinese: 虛詞) is a Hong Kong online literary magazine established in 2018 by the House of Hong Kong Literature. Operated as both a website and a physical monthly magazine, it was funded by the Hong Kong Arts Development Council and aimed to promote literature in Hong Kong, featuring literary news, reviews, and submissions. In May 2024, the physical edition was discontinued due to the withdrawal of funding from the Council, while the website continues to operate.

== History ==
P-articles was founded on 27 May 2018 by the House of Hong Kong Literature, offering both a website and a physical monthly magazine branch called Formless (無形). The website includes submissions, reviews and criticism, opinion columns, and interviews, with a literary news section in development at its launch. Funded by the Hong Kong Arts Development Council, it was headquartered at the Museum of Hong Kong Literature's office. Tang Siu-wa, the Museum's curator and writer, served as the magazine's chief editor, while writer Lawrence Pun was also part of the editorial board. Tang noted that the Museum established P-articles to evoke familiarity and interest among the public through literary criticism and interviews in accessible language, rather than focusing on abstract literary concepts.

In December 2020, a Macau column was introduced in Formless, inviting Macanese writers to contribute articles about Macau, with Un Sio San, Aolei Lu, and Pan Lei among the first batch of submitters. The Hong Kong Arts Development Council had funded the magazine three times, with renewals every two years, and the most recent funding was provided in 2022. However, funding was subsequently withdrawn in 2024 following the Council's restructuring. In April 2024, Formless was announced to be discontinued after its 72nd and final volume was released that month, while the Museum of Hong Kong Literature found an alternative source of funding to sustain the website's operations. Staff was also reduced, leaving only one full-time member, and the headquarters was relocated to a smaller office along with the Museum of Hong Kong Literature, which also faced funding cuts from the Council.

== Operations ==
Chief editor Tang Siu-wa explained that the magazine's English name "P-articles" is a literal translation of the Chinese name "虛詞" (meaning grammatical particles) and can also be interpreted as describing different emotional states while writing "articles", such as "playful", "painful", or "pleasant". P-articles's editorial team consisted of three members, namely executive editor Michelle Chan, editor Louis Tsang, and journalist Victor Wong. Chan noted that, unlike typical literary magazines, P-articles adopted a mass media-like business model after a period of operation, beginning to report on obituaries and news about award ceremonies, as well as allowing submissions on social issues. Articles on the website are updated weekly, with the first batch featuring column articles by writer Hon Lai-chu. While the physical edition Formless had a specific theme for each volume, the editorial team would approach and invite related writers and content creators to contribute. Both the website and magazine did not restrict submissions based on the identity of the contributor, for instance, there were visual artists submitting reviews of animes.

Tang noted that they aimed to keep up with every year's major publications, mentioning that about 80-90% of the newly published Hong Kong books were covered in their news, interviews, or reviews. A total of 7,500 copies of Formless were published each month, a number Chan noted far exceeded that of any other literary magazine in Hong Kong, with about 90% distributed with Jet Magazine, while the remainder was sold at independent bookstores.
