= Un Sio San =

Macau poet and writer

- Born: Macau
- Education: Peking University
- Occupations: Poet, essayist
- Writing career
- Language: Chinese, English
- Notable work: Naked Picnic (2014)

Un Sio San is a Chinese poet and writer from Macau. She has published six collections of poetry, and her work has won several honors, including the inaugural New Star–People's Literature Prize of Poetry in China, and the Henry Luce Foundation Chinese Poetry Fellowship.

== Biography ==
Un Sio San was born in Macau. She completed her undergraduate education at Peking University, studying Chinese Language and Art (film and television production), and her master's degree in East Asian and Pacific Asia studies at Toronto University.

== Career ==
Un Sio San has published six collections of poetry: Exile in the Blossom Time, Wonderland, Evolution of Love, Here, Naked Picnic, and Bitter Lotus Seed. She has also published a book of essays titled Boisterous Islands. Naked Picnic is a collection of poems composed at International Poetry Nights in Hong Kong 2013, and published bilingually, in Chinese and English. She was also the lyricist who composed for Macau's first original indoor opera, A Fragrant Dream.

Her work has won several awards, including the inaugural New Star–People's Literature Prize of Poetry in China, America's Henry Luce Foundation Fellowship for Chinese Poetry, and the Haizi Poetry Prize. She has also been an artist-in-residence at Vermont Studio Center and the Arctic Circle Programme. She also contributes to newspapers in China, Taiwan, Hong Kong, and Macau. She has spoken about the challenges of publishing poetry in Macau, and about the access that Macanese writers have to other Chinese publishers, including those in Hong Kong, China, and Taiwan.

== Bibliography ==
- (2008) Exile in the Blossom Time (Hong Kong: Kubrick) ISBN 9-789-88992-4676
- (2011) Wonderland (Taipei: Vista Publishing) ISBN 9-789-57390-8005
- (2011) Here (Macao: ASM).
- (2014) Naked Picnic (Columbia University Press) ISBN 9-789-62996-6287
- Bitter Lotus Seed
- Evolution of Love
- (2020) Boisterous Islands
