= Leung Ping-kwan =

Hong Kong poet, novelist, essayist, translator, teacher and scholar

- 梁秉鈞
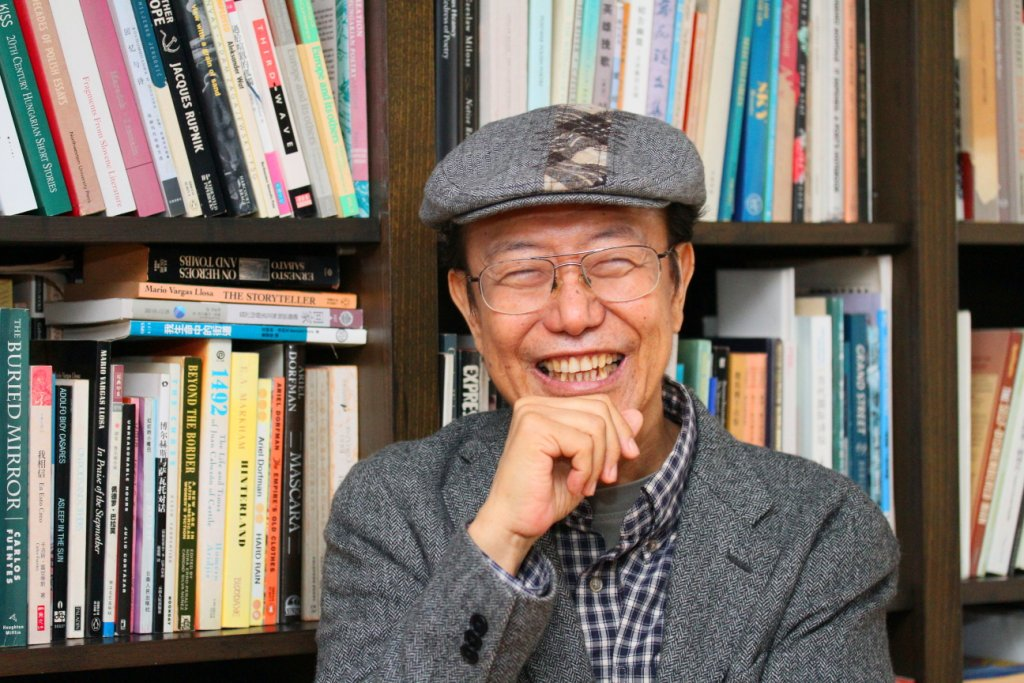
- Born: Guangdong, Xinhui
- Died: 2013, 63 years old
- Occupations: poet, novelist, essayist, translator, and scholar
- Spouse(s): Betty Ng (pen name Ng Hui Bun, Xubin)
- Writing career
- Pen name: Yesi / Yasi (也斯)
- Period: 1960s–2013
- Website: leungpingkwan.com

Leung Ping-kwan, (simplified Chinese: 梁秉钧; traditional Chinese: 梁秉鈞; pinyin: Liáng Bǐngjūn, 12 March 1949 – 5 January 2013) pen name Yěsī (也斯), was a Hong Kong poet, novelist, essayist, translator, teacher, and scholar who received the Hong Kong Medal of Honour (MH). He was an important long-time cultural figure in Hong Kong.

== Life ==
Yesi was born in Xinhui District in Guangdong during 1949. The same year, his family settled in Hong Kong, and he was raised there. His father died when he was four.

He began writing in the 1960s and quickly became known as a translator of foreign-language literature and for his editorial work on a number of literary publications targeted at young Chinese readers in both Hong Kong and Taiwan.

After graduating from Hong Kong Baptist College, now Hong Kong Baptist University, with a bachelor's degree in English (BA in English Language and Literature), Yesi got a job first as a secondary school teacher, then as the editor of the arts supplement of the South China Morning Post (SCMP). In 1978, he went to America for further studies. In 1984, Yesi obtained his PhD in comparative literature at the University of California, San Diego. His thesis was titled "Aesthetics of Opposition: A Study of the Modernist Generation of Chinese Poets, 1936-1949".

Yesi returned to Hong Kong after earning his doctorate. He taught at the Department of English Studies and Comparative Literature at the University of Hong Kong. In 1998 he obtained a position as a professor in comparative literature in the Chinese Department at Lingnan University. Later on, he also became director of the Research Institute for the Humanities. He specialized in teaching literature and film, comparative literature, the literature of Hong Kong, modern literary criticism, and Chinese literary writing.

Yesi had achievements across many areas of literature, including poetry, prose, novels, drama, and literary and cultural criticism. He wrote mostly in Chinese. However, his English works were also published in the Hong Kong magazine Muse and his poetry and prose have been translated into English, French, Korean, Japanese, Arabic, Portuguese, and German.

In 2010, Yesi stated publicly that he had been diagnosed with lung cancer. He died on 5 January 2013.

=== Timeline ===
Time	
early 1960s	Began his writing career
1960s	Actively introducing foreign literature into Hong Kong, including the French New Novel, American underground literature, and Latin American literature writing in many genres, including poetry, prose, fiction as well as critical essays
1978	Studies at the University of California, San Diego, specializing in modern Chinese poetry and western modernism
Later on, he returned to Hong Kong	Taught at the Department of English and Comparative Literature at the University of Hong Kong (1985-1997) and then joined the Department of Chinese at Lingnan University as Chair of Comparative Literature, and as Director of the Centre for Humanities Research under the Institute of Humanities and Social Sciences (1997-2013)
2013	Leung died peacefully at Union Hospital in Hong Kong. His last wish was for Hong Kong Literature to receive the attention it deserves, and good writers from Hong Kong to be acknowledged, both locally and globally.

- Information in this table is extracted from Leung's biography in the book "Leung Ping Kwan (1949 – 2013), A Retrospective".

== "Yesi" ==
"Yesi" is a combination of two meaningless words, both interjections, in Chinese. According to Yesi, people usually adopt a pen name that contains meanings, which would give the readers a fixed feeling or impression towards their works before they read them. Yesi wanted to break out of this, hence, he used the combination of two meaningless words, which usually appear in classical Chinese literary works, as his pen name.

== Prominent themes and concerns ==
Images of Hong Kong

This poem embodies the spirit and concerns of Yesi's work, including tone and recurrent themes. Later, this poem would be used as an example for further analysis of Yesi's style.

We need a fresh angle, nothing added nothing taken away,
Always at the edge of things and between places.
Write with a different color for each voice;
…
So now, once again, they say it’s time to remodel
and each of us finds himself looking around for –what?

=== Observation, perception, and angle ===
Many of Yesi's works are concerned with the way we look at the world, and also how we are perceived by other people—trying to discover new angles for observing the world, while inevitably the object of others’ perception as well. The opening sentence of “Images of Hong Kong” clearly declares: “I need a new angle”. In many of Yesi's works, the narrator wants not only to see the world, but also to look at it in a unique way, different from mainstream perceptions.

However, Yesi's narrators are introspective and aware that they are part of what's happening. The novel Paper Cut-outs (剪紙) is composed of two story lines, each about the narrator's interaction with a female friend. The two story lines can be read as separate stories, yet, they contrast and complement each other in details and contents. Both his friends faced a catastrophe nearly at the end of the story, and the narrator says:

人與人之間的關係互相牽連，混合了我們這些其他人的感情。我們這些旁觀者一下子也牽涉其中了，我們可以指責某種偏激行為…但當不幸的事發生了，我們可以置身事外嗎?” (161) (Translation: A relationship would be affected by other relationships. Observers’ feelings are mixed into the relationship of the observed. Outsiders and observers are also part of what he or she is observing. We can blame certain violent acts… However, when tragedy happens, who can be responsibility-free?)

The narrator feels sorry for what happened to his friends, and for not being able to do anything, except narrate and watch the problem grow, and turn into a catastrophe.

=== Flânerie ===
Observation in Yesi's poems almost always associated with flânerie. More precisely, the narrator is very often a flâneur. Yesi writes about different places and even flânerie itself. Images of Hong Kong includes many different locations: Guangguang studio in Nathan Road, Star Ferry clock tower, Aberdeen, China Club, and so on. In the poem On a Road, A Wanderer:

I choose my own direction
big fish glide in the aquariums
food stalls offer whopper fishballs
I'm not lured
…
I don’t have to see so clearly
…
if by chance the city glare
blinds me
I glance away,
keeping my own pace

The above describes how the narrator strolling unaffected by the surroundings. He observes and sees “big fish glide”, “food stalls”, and so on, yet uses the outer appearance of the city, to search his heart. It is notable that he “[doesn’t] have to see so clearly”. Again, the narrator keeps himself different from others.

=== Nostalgia and history ===
There is very often a sense of pity for the disappearing past in Yesi’s works. For example, in Images of Hong Kong, the people do not paint on photos “any more”, and the “old portrait” cannot be reproduced. Like this portrait, in many of Yesi's works, we can see things that are disappearing with the past. Also, the narrator says that history is a “montage of images”, and evaluates if Hong Kong's past is only figures of famous buildings like the Star Ferry. He suggests that the past should be read with “a fresh angle" and reviews the way to looking into the past.

=== Hong Kong ===
Yesi is recognized as a Hong Kong poet, not only because he grew up in the city, but more importantly due to his concern for it. Images of Hong Kong show such concern, as the narrator wants to find a new angle to shoot Hong Kong. Moveover, Some of Yesi's other poems are about places in Hong Kong, such as Winter Scene from Tai Mei Tuk, Reclaimed Land in Tai Kok Tsui, and Midway, Quarry Bay. Apart from the sense of place, Hong Kong serves as an important context for Yesi's novels. Again, take Paper Cut-outs as an example; the narrator's two female friends actually symbolize Hong Kong people's identity. This is also how Chinese culture and Western culture failed to understand or merge with one other in Hong Kong. For example, Qiáo 喬, a modern women, is a character showing that Hong Kong people do not understand their Chinese origin very well, but on the other hand, are not completely westernized. She cannot understand or grasp the feelings in traditional Chinese poems. Moreover, her face is so pale that it would reflect the color of her surroundings:

外面廣告牌上的一大幅粉藍色填滿所有窗口，喬的臉孔染上一片粉藍。…經過一片淺黃，她的臉又泛上淺黃。 (Translation:The billboard outside the bus filled the latter’s windows with light blue, so as Qiáo’s face…When the bus passes through a sea of light yellow, her face also reflects in yellow.)

This symbolizes the cultural identity of Hong Kong, actually quite fragile. Without rooting in Chinese or Western culture, Hong Kong does not have, or has not created, any distinct culture. They are easily affected by others, and reflect others’ colors.

Even in the most seemingly unlikely sphere to be associated with Hong Kong, Yesi shows his concern for the city. For him, travelling has a lot to do with home. The book Leung Ping Kwan (1949 – 2013), A Retrospective 回看.也斯, says that “[e]very foreign place he visited invoked in him even deeper thoughts about Hong Kong. He wrote copiously about his cross-border experiences, in prose and in poetry, from eastern culture to western culture, from literature and art to cultural observations, from old ideas to new concepts, posing questions that would not have been formulated if he had not left Hong Kong, and trying to portray, to a Hong Kong wallowing in old habits, new sets of emotion and knowledge in hope of a change.”

In short, Yesi's works are deeply concerned with Hong Kong, no matter what the topic or context.

== Characteristics of Yesi's works ==
=== Personification of places and objects ===
Yesi often personified places and objects in his poems. Some of these poems include Central, Europe After Rain, and Bittermelon. Yesi would talk gently to the personified objects, as if they were his friends. In Europe After Rain, the narrator walks into a church, and talks to the place: “I shiver in the cold. You don't seem to have heard my prayer. Your four walls are mottled, the ancient stories have turned into reliefs, in the flickering light and shadow your magnificent and inevitabilities of history.”

Very often, there are interactions of “I” and “you” in Yesi's works, but the latter is sometimes an object or a place.

=== Voice, tone, and narrative ===
There is a sort of double voicing in Yesi's poems, multiple layers of meaning. In the poem Bittermelon: he says:

You're not worn-out or beaten-down,
you're just resting.
The loudest song's not necessarily passionate;
the bitterest pain stays in the heart.
Is it because you've seen lots of false sunlight,
too much thunder and lightning, hurt and hurting...

The narrator not only converses with objects and places but also to the reader. He asks “[i]s it because you've seen lots of false sunlight…too many indifferent and temperamental days” that you have stopped talking about your sufferings? The questions give us a feeling that the narrator sympathizes with us, the readers, and gently inquires as to our situations. Instead of readers reading the poem, the poem seems to read us as well.

Your silence is much to be admired;
you keep the bitter taste to yourself.
...
in the wind, our bittermelon, steadily facing
worlds of confused worlds of confused bees and butterflies and a garden gone wild

The narrator seems to be talking to himself and also to the author. Yesi's narrators often try to position and view themselves in a way different from the mainstream. Above “our bittermelon” is described as “steadily facing worlds of confused bees and butterflies and a garden gone wild”. This seems to describe the narrator, or perhaps Yesi himself, trying to walk in “[his] own pace” (Images of Hong Kong) without being distracted by the world, or by mainstream values. Some of Yesi's first and second person narrators do interchange with each other. In Paper Cut-outs, when the narrator refers to his friend Yáo 瑤, he always uses second person narrative “you”. The book's narrative sometimes changes, and the narrator refers to readers, characters, and himself with the plural pronoun “we”. Similarly, in the above poem, in the end the bittermelon becomes “ours” at last.

== Influences on Yesi's works ==
=== Latin-American magical realism ===
Yesi “was the first to bring in Latin American literary icons such as Gabriel Garcìa Márquez, Pablo Neruda, Jorge Luis Borges and Mario Vargas Llosa before they were widely known”. His works are also heavily influenced by magical realism. Many critics have noted how Yesi used magical elements to interpret reality in his novels. For example, a critic analyzed magic realism in Yesi's novel “Shih-man the Dragon-keeper” 《養龍人師門》.

Another example: the description of Qiáo's room in Paper Cut-outs demonstrates features of magic realism. The narrator visits Qiáo, who is a psychotic. In her room, “many red birds are drawn on the white walls, approximately thirty” 白色牆壁上畫滿紅色鳥兒，一共有好幾十隻. She “walks close to the walls, between the red birds” 她走近牆邊，走入那些紅色的鳥兒中間. The “birds listen to and obey her!” 鳥兒是聽話的！ “Each of her birds have names. Good Bò Bò. Fā Fā was naughty yesterday, and Wá Wá hasn’t eaten for a few days” 她的鳥兒都有名字。柏柏乖，發發昨天淘氣，娃娃幾天不吃東西了. The birds fly in the room. “She touches the wings of one of the birds” (喬撫著一頭鳥的翅膀), and a bird “stops on [the narrator’s] fingertip” (停在我的指尖). Although the birds are painted on the walls, Qiáo regarded them as alive. Imagination becomes reality in this passage.

=== Modernism ===
Modernism seeks to write novels in a way that reflects a human being's inner thoughts, which are often fragmented. Yesi's novels also write about different moments in life that are perhaps not consistent. In the novel Paper Cut-outs, linkage between the two seemingly separate story lines is imagined and drawn by readers. There is no clear message imposed by the author. Paper cut-outs are like fragmented moments, words, and phrases, which are all broken into parts. The connections between the fragments are vague; ambiguity is an important feature of modernism.

=== Chinese literature ===
Chinese literature also heavily influences Yesi's work. Elements of Chinese culture, like folk and opera, can be seen in his works. Elements of Cantonese opera can be seen in his work Paper Cut-outs. Also, he inherited some of the traditional Chinese forms of writing. For example, his Bittermelon poem praises this plant, which symbolizes virtues stressed in Chinese culture – patience and endurance. The narrator credits bittermelon for its “silence”, saying it "keep[s] the bitter taste to [itself]”. This means being willing and able to endure suffering and not making others feel pity. The poem echoes the Chinese literary tradition of praising an object that symbolizes virtue and good people.

=== Other art media ===
Yesi was not satisfied with just language. Other art media were also sources of inspiration; for example performance art, photography, and film. He “entered into countless dialogues with artists of different media”, and even collaborated with them to write literary works. For example, dancer Mui Cheuk Yin performed the dance “Kikikoko”, and Yesi wrote a poem inspired by her performance – Ladder Street. Yesi's work is also influenced by his interest in film. He often writes as if he is shooting a scene with his camera. For example, the narrator keeps looking for an angle in Images of Hong Kong and in another poem, City of Films is introspective in evaluating the best way to capture Hong Kong like a movie shooting:

...then in the second half, find you're your enemy's son
life goes on without knowing what’s happened
if reality's too hard, there’s always soft focus
the world's still out there, the PR guy’s at the door
with new schemes for artful promotion
and for the film a new title

== Achievements ==
Yesi was recognized as both a writer and a scholar, received various literary awards, and was invited as visiting scholar to universities across the globe. The German professor Wolfgang Kubin commented that Yesi was “a rare Hong Kong writer with a global vision”.

Some examples of recognition are provided as follows:

=== Awards ===
- Artist of the Year Award by the Hong Kong Artists’ Guild (1992)
- Hong Kong Biennial Awards for Chinese Literature by the Urban Council
- Leisure and Cultural Services Department (Postcards from Prague, 1991; Midway, 1996; Postcolonial Affairs of Food and the Heart, 2011)
- Medal of Honor by the government of Hong Kong(2006)
- Best Artist Award by the Hong Kong Arts Development Council (2010)
- Hong Kong Book Prize by Radio Television Hong Kong (Flavors of the Floating World, 2012)
- Author of the Year by the Hong Kong Book Fair 2012 and his work and collaborative art pieces were exhibited in his retrospective exhibition themed “Dialogues in the Humanities”

=== Visiting scholar, various universities ===
- York University, Canada (1995)
- Heidelberg University (2000)
- University of Tokyo (2003)
- University of Zurich (2004)
- Fulbright Fellowship to do research at Harvard University for six months (2006)

== Publications ==
=== Creative writing ===
Books (in Chinese)

- 2009《後殖民食物與愛情》(Postcolonial Affairs of Food and the Heart). Hong Kong: Oxford University Press (OUP), 278pp.
- 2009《越界的行程》(Journeys across Borders: Selected Stories). Hong Kong and Singapore: Ming Pao Monthly and Ching Nan Publications. 420 pp.

Prose

- 2012 《書與城市》(Books and the City). Beijing: Zhejiang University Press 浙江大學出版社, 264 pp.
- 2011 《人間滋味》(Tastes of the Floating World). Hong Kong: Enrich Publishing 天窗, 221 pp. Winner, 2011 Hong Kong Book Prize
- 2005 《也斯的香港》(Hong Kong in the Eyes of Ye Si). Hong Kong: Joint Publishing 三聯, 176 pp.
- 2002 《在柏林走路》(Walking in Berlin). Hong Kong: OUP 牛津, 197 pp.
- 2002 《新果自然來》(New Fruits from Taiwan). Hong Kong: OUP 牛津, 100 pp.
- 2000 《越界的月亮》(Moon Across Borders). Hangzhou: Zhejiang Literary Press 淅江文藝, 256 pp.
- 1996 《越界書簡》(Letters Across Borders). Hong Kong: Youth Literary Bookstore 青文, 186 pp.
- 1991 《昆明的除夕》(New Year's Eve in Qunming). Hong Kong: Breakthrough; reprint: OUP 牛津, 2002.
- 1988 《城市筆記》(City Notes). Taipei: Dongdai 東大, 246 pp.
- 1987 《山光水影》(Lights and Shadows). Reprint; Hong Kong: OUP 牛津, 2002, 218 pp.
- 1981 《街巷人物》(Landscapes and Portraits). Reprint; Hong Kong: OUP 牛津, 2002, 254 pp.
- 1978 《神話午餐》(Myths and Lunches). Taipei: Hung-fan 洪範, 230 pp
- 1972 《灰鴿早晨的話》(Grey Pigeon Mornings). Taipei: Yu-shi 幼獅, 180 pp.

Poetry

- 2012 《東西》(East-West) Beijing: Chinese Drama Publishing, 中國戲劇出版社 208 pp.
- 2007 《蔬菜的政治》(Vegetable Politics) Hong Kong : OUP, 144pp.
- 2000 《東西》(East West Matters). Hong Kong: OUP 牛津, 174 pp.
- 1996 《博物館》(Museum Pieces). Hong Kong: Hong Kong Arts Centre 香港藝術中心, 20 pp.
- 1995 《遊離的詩》(A Poetry of Moving Signs). Hong Kong: OUP 牛津, 142 pp.
- 1985 《遊詩》(The Journeys). Hong Kong: Institute for the Promotion of Chinese Culture, 66 pp.
- 1979 《雷聲與蟬嗚》(The Thunderbolt and the Cicada Song). Hong Kong: The Thumb Press 大拇指, 294 pp.

Fiction

- 2000 《布拉格的明信片》(Postcards from Prague). Hong Kong: Chuangjian, 1990, 192 pp. (Reprint : Hong Kong, Youth Book Store 青文, 2000, 236 pp.)
- 1996 《煩惱娃娃的旅程》(Journey of the Trouble Dolls). Quilin: Lijiang Publications 漓江, 210 pp.
- 1994 《記憶的城市‧ 虛構的城市》(Cities of Memory, Cities of Fabrication). Hong Kong: OUP, 264 pp.
- 1988 《三魚集》(Three Fish). Hong Kong: Tianyuan 田園, 298 pp.
- 1987 《島和大陸》(The Islands and Continents). Reprint; Hong Kong: OUP 牛津, 2002, 208 pp.
- 1982 《剪紙》(Paper Cutouts). Reprint; Hong Kong: OUP 牛津, 2002, 142 pp.
- 1979 《養龍人師門》(Shih-man the Dragon-keeper). Taipei: Min-chun 民眾, Reprint; Hong Kong: OUP 牛津, 2002, 218 pp.

Selected Works

- 1995 《浮藻》(Floating Weeds: Selected Poems) Beijing: Zhongguo Wenlian 中國文聯, 314 pp.
- 1995 《半途：梁秉鈞詩選》(Mid way: Selected Poems) Hong Kong: Writers‘ Association Publication 作聯, 336 pp.
- 1994 《尋找空間》(Searching For Space: Selected Stories). Beijing: Beijing People's University Press 中國人民大學, 334 pp.
- 1989 《梁秉鈞卷》(Selected Works of Leung Ping-kwan). Hong Kong: Joint Publishing Co. 三聯, 386 pp.

=== Books ===
(in English)

- 2020 Lotus Leaves (Selected Poems of Leung Ping-kwan, translated by John Minford). Hong Kong: Research Centre for Translation, CUHK, 2020, 280pp.
- 2020 Dragons (Shorter Fiction of Leung Ping-kwan, translated by Wendy Chan, Jasmine Tong Man and David Morgan). Hong Kong: The Chinese University of Hong Kong Press, 2020, 188pp.
- 2015 Paper Cuts (Novel, translated by Brian Holton). Hong Kong: Research Centre for Translation, CUHK, 2015, 160pp.
- 2010 Amblings (Selected poems on art and places, translated by Kit Kelen and others). Macau: ASM, 2010, 239pp.
- 2009 Shifting Borders (Selected poems about Macau, Hong Kong and the Pearl River Delta, translated by Kit Kelen and others). Macau: ASM, 2009, 198pp.
- 2007 Islands and Continents: Short Stories by Leung Ping-kwan (Selected stories, edited by John Minford, translated by Brian Holton and others) Hong Kong: Hong Kong University Press.
- 2002 Travelling With a Bitter Melon 帶一枚苦瓜旅行 ("Selected poems: 1973-1998", edited by Martha Cheung). Hong Kong: Asia 2000, 352 pp.
- 1998 Clothink. 衣想 (Bilingual edition of poetry translated by John Minford and others). Hong Kong: Youth Literary Bookstore, 46 pp.
- 1997 Foodscape. 食事地域誌 (Bilingual edition of poetry translated by Martha Cheung). Hong Kong: The Original Photograph Club Limited, 22 pp.
- 1992 City at the End of Time. 形象香港 (Bilingual edition of poetry co-edited and co-translated with Gordon T. Osing). Hong Kong: Department of Comparative Literature, University of Hong Kong & Twilight Books, 186 pp.

Books (in French)

- 2012 En ces jours instables (poems translated by Camille Loivier), Hong Kong: MCCM Creations.
- 2010 Artichaut (poem by P.K.Leung, painting by Paul Magendie) Édition Nihil Obstat.
- 2006 De ci de là des choses (Selected poems, edited and translated by Annie Curien) Paris : You Feng, 96pp.
- 2001 Îles et Continents (Selected stories, edited and translated by Annie Curien). Paris: Gallimard, 154pp.

Books (in German)

- 2012 Sichtbares und Verborgenes Gedhte (The Visible and the Invisible Poems translated by Andrea Riemenschnitter and Helen Wallimann), Hong Kong: MCCM Creations.
- 2009 Von Jade und Holz (poems trans.Wolfgang Kubin). Klagenfurt/Celovec: Drava Verlag. 136 pp.
- 2000 Von Politik und den Früchten des Feldes (A selection of poems translated by Wolfgang Kubin). Berlin: Deutscher Akademischer Austauschdienst, 81 pp.
- 2000 Seltsame Geschichten von Vögeln und Blumen (A selection of poems translated by Wolfgang Kubin). Hong Kong： Goethe Institute, 48 pp.

Books (in Japanese)

- 2011 《也斯詩集》池上貞子編 日本: 思潮社, 181pp.

Books (in Portuguese)

- 2012 Mapa Refeito (poems trans. Beatriz Brasil). Macau: Publicado pela Associação de Estória em Macau. 117pp.

Stories, poems and essays (in various foreign languages)

- 2017 La moule et l'identité culturelle, Alcool fraîchement distillé et Discours sur le porc, (trad. Gwennaël Gaffric), in "Jentayu: Woks et Marmites", 2017, no 5, 21-41-58.
- 2004 Poetry and Politics translated into Japanese by Shozo Fujii, in Eureka: Poetry and Criticism, 5/2004. no 492 Vol.36-5, 221-230.
- 2004 Nourriture et identité culturelle, (trad. Emilie Huang), in "Hong Kong: Approches Littéraires", Jan-Mar 2004, Paris: Éditions You-feng Libraire Éditeur. 53-67.
- 2004 Chercher son chemin à Kyôto, in "ALIBIS: Dialogues littéraires franco-chinois" 3/2004, Paris: Éditions de la Maison des sciences de l‘homme. 17-34.
- 2004 L‘écriture en décalage de temps, in Écrire au present, 3/2004, Paris: Éditions de la Maison des sciences de l‘homme. 31-37.
- 2004 Hong Kong Culture and Hong Kong Literature, in Lan-BLUE, a bilingual cultural journal in Japanese and Chinese, no.13, 105-120.
- 2003 Liebe in Zeiten von Sars, in Orientierungen Zeitschrift zur Kultur Asiens 2/2003, Munich: Edition Global.133-135.
- 2003 Die Stadt mit der Maske, in Orientierungen Zeitschrift zur Kultur Asiens 2/2003, Munich: Edit ion Global.136-144.
- 2002 Poetry from the Artist‘s Brush, "Coloured Verses", Hong Kong: Galerie Klee. i-iv
- 2001 Engager le passé (Engaging the Past), in Annie Curien and Jin Siyan eds. Littérature chinoise., 11/2001, Paris： Éditions de la Maison des sciences de l‘homme, 91-97.
- 2001 Ville monster et autres poèmes (7 poems and an interview), Poésie 2001, No. 88, June 2001, 56-78.
- 2001 Postcolonial Affairs of Food and the Heart, Persimmon, Vol. 1, No. 3 (Winter), 42-57.
- 2000 Zwei Gedichte und ein Essay zum Thema Wasser (Two Poems and an Essay on the Theme of Water in German translation) in Wasser, ed. Bernd Busch und Larissa Förster. Kunst- und Ausstellungshalle der Bundesrepublik Deutschland GmbH, Bonn, 266-269.
- 2000 Foodscape (a series of 10 poems), translated into Japanese by Shozo Fujii, in Eureka: Poetry and Criticism, August, 42-53.
- 2000 Cinema and Urban Imagination: Eileen Chang as a Scriptwriter, translated into Japanese by Akinari Sato in China Express: Beijing~Shanghai~Hong Kong~Taipei . Tokyo : Nippon Academy Awards Institute, 52-57.
- 1999 Seltsame Geschichten von Vögeln und Blumn (Eleven poems in German Translation). Sprache im technischen Zeitalter, No. 152 (December), 495-505.
- 1998 The First Day, ―The Story of Hong Kong, ―The Walled City in Kowloon: a space we shared and―The Sorrows of Lan Kwan Fong, trans. and ed. Martha Cheung in Hong Kong Collage. Hong Kong: Oxford University Press, 99-106; 3-16; 34-39; 5-98.
- 1998 Ausblutende Zeichen (―The Chinese Language that has Died Many Times in German translation), Lettre International, No. 41(July), 44-45.
- 1997 Bilder von Hong Kong‖ and ―Tiger Balm Garden‖ (two poems translated by German poet Joachim Sartorius), Frankfurter Allgemeine Zeitung (30 May, Nr. 122, Seite 41).
- 1997 Cities of Memory, Cities of Fabrication (excerpts). English translation by Richard Sheung. Renditions, No. 47 & 48, 93-104.
- 1997 Pun Choi on New Year‘s Eve (poem) and Cities of Memory, Cities of Fabrication (excerpts) Japanese translation. The Subarn Monthly (July), 184-203.
- 1996 Vier Postkarten Aus Prag (Postcards from Prague). German translation by Beate Rusch, Die Zeitschrift der Kultur, No. 9 (Sept.), 8-9.
- 1995 Thirteen poems translated and selected in From the Bluest Part of the Harbour: Poems from Hong Kong, ed. Andrew Parkin. Hong Kong, Oxford and New York: Oxford University Press, 21-43.
- 1994 The Leaf on the Edge, Distinguished Leaves and Street -Lamp and the Tin Leaf. Talisman: A Journal of Contemporary Poetry and Poetics, 12 (Spring). 173-174.
- 1994 Morning in a Foreign Land, Poetry Canada 14:3 (May). 22.
- 1994 Four Poems in English, Dutch and French translation. Brussel Kunsten Festival des Arts, May
- 1994 Two Poems in Yugoslavian translation, Antologija Savremene Kineske Poezije. Boegrad: Filip Visnjic, 202-206.
- 1994 Transcendence and the Fax Machine in Running Wild: New Chinese Writers, ed. David Der-Wei Wang with Jeanne Tai. New York: Columbia University Press, 13-20.
- 1993 Six Poems "Position 1:1" (Spring). 18-23.
- 1993 Unterwegs Gedichte (Seven poems in German translation). Minims Sinica 2 (1991). 105-119.
- 1991 Auntie Li's Pocket Watch, "Worlds of Modern Chinese Fiction", ed. Michael S. Duke. New York and London: M.E. Sharpe, 311-318.

=== Critical Writing ===
Books (in Chinese)

- 2006 Co-editor, 《東亞文化與中文文學》("East Asian Culture & Modern Literature in Chinese"). Hong Kong, Ming Pao Press. 412 pp.
- 2005 Co-editor, 《香港文學電影編目》 ("An Annotated Filmography of Hong Kong Cinema Adapted from Literature") Hong Kong: CHR, Lingnan University. 232pp.
- 2005 Co-editor, 《現代漢詩論集》("Studies on Modern Poetry in Chinese"). Hong Kong, CHR, Lingnan University. 309pp.
- 2004 Co-editor, "The Literary Review, An International Journal of Contemporary Writing", Summer 2004, Vol.47 No.4, New Jersey: Fairleigh Dickinson University, 7-153.
- 2002 Co-editor (with Prof. Joseph S.M. Lau and Dr. Zi-dong Xu), 《重讀張愛玲》(Re-reading Eileen Cheung) Hong Kong: OUP. 344 pp.
- 1996 《香港文化空間與文學》(Cultural Space and Literature). Hong Kong: Youth Literary Bookstore, 220 pp.
- 1995 《香港文化》(Hong Kong Culture). Hong Kong: Hong Kong Arts Centre, 60 pp.
- 1995 Editor, 《香港文化專輯》 (Special Issue on Hong Kong Culture), «今天»("Today"), 28, 71-257.
- 1995 Editor, 《香港文化特集》(Special Supplement on Hong Kong Culture), « 號外»("City Magazine"), No. 266 (July).
- 1993 Editor, 《香港的流行文化》(Popular Culture in Hong Kong). Hong Kong: Joint Publishing Co. Ltd., 220 pp.

Books a1n9d8 5C iti 《《書與城市》(Books and Cities). Hong Kong: Xiangang; reprint: OUP, 2002, 299pp.

Articles (in English)

- 2005 Tasting Asia (12 poems and interview), Modern Chinese Literature and Culture, Vol 17, No. 1, 8-30.
- 2004 Reading Wen Yiduo From Hong Kong and Rethinking the Modern and Chinese in Wen‘s Works: Poet, Scholar, Patriot in Honour of Wen Yiduo's 100th Anniversary, Hans Peter Hoffmann (ed.), Bochum/Freiburg: project verlag, 111-126.
- 2002 Writing between Chinese and English, "Asian Englishes Today: Hong Kong English Autonomy and Creativity", Hong Kong: Hong Kong University Press, 199-205
- 2000 Urban Cinema and the Cultural Identity of Hong Kong, "The Cinema of Hong Kong: History, Arts, Identity", Fu & Desser (eds), Cambridge University Press, 227-251.
- 1998 Huang Guliu and Eileen Chang on Hong Kong of the 1940s: Two Discourses on Colonialism "Boundary 2", Vol.25, No.3 (Winter), 77-96.
- 1998 Eileen Chang and Hong Kong Urban Cinema, "Transcending the Times: King Hu & Eileen Chang, Catalogue of the 22nd Hong Kong International Film Festival". Hong Kong: Provisional Urban Council of Hong Kong
- 1998 Representing Hong Kong through the Work of the Poet in "City at the End of Time", Hong Kong
- 1997 Vancouver: The Pomelo Project, 13-20.
- 1997 From Cities in Hong Kong Cinema to Urban Cinema in Hong Kong in "Fifty Years of Electric Shadows: The 21st Hong Kong International Film Festival". Hong Kong: Urban Council, 25-28.
- 1997 History in Hong Kong Cinema "Hong Kong Film Archive Newsletter", No.1 (Sept.). 10-11.
- 1996 Problematizing National Cinema: Hong Kong Cinema in Search of Its Cultural Identity, "River City" (Winter), 23-40.
- 1996 Modern Hong Kong Poetry: Negotiation of Cultures and the Search for Identity "Modern Chinese Literature", Vol. 9. 221-245.
- 1994 Recycling Images in the Cultural Space of Hong Kong, an introduction to Wingo Lee Ka-sing, "31 Photographs of Lee Ka-sing". Hong Kong: Photoart, 1-24.
- 1993 Homeless Poems and Photographs, "Nu Na He Duo (Dislocation)", 2:2 (February), 2-6.
- 1992 Literary Modernity in Chinese Poetry, in "Lyrics from Shelters: Modern Chinese Poetry 1930-1950", ed. Wai-lim Yip. New York and London: Garland Publishing Inc., 43-68.

Articles (in Chinese)

- 2007 <胡金銓電影︰中國文化資源與六O年代港台的文化場域>, (The Cinema of King Hu: Chinese Cultural Resources in the 1960s' Cultural Fields of Hong Kong and Taiwan 《現代中文文學學報》 ("Journal of Modern Literature" in Chinese) Vol.8, No.1, Jan. 2007.
- 2006〈翻譯與詩學〉(Translation and Poetics), 《江漢大學學報》("Journal of Jianghan University"), Vol.24, No.6. Dec., 2005. 21-26
- 2005〈中國三、四O 年代抗戰詩與現代性〉(Chinese War Poetry and Modernity), "JMLC", 6.2/7.1, 159-175.
- 2005〈「改編」的文化身份：以五十年代香港文學為例〉(―Adapted - Cultural Identity: Hong Kong Literature in the 1950s),《 東亞現代中文文學國際學報》("International Journal of Asian Scholars on Modern Literature" in Chinese) Vol.1, No.1, Sept. 2005.
- 2004〈王家衛電影中的空間〉(Space in the film of Wong Kar-wai), 《王家衛的映畫世界》("The Film World of Wong Kar-wai"), Hong Kong: Joint Publishing (HK) Co. Ltd, 2004, 24-25.
- 2003〈兩類型的殖民論述：黃谷柳與張愛玲筆下四O 年代的香港〉(Two Types of Postcolonial Discourses),《作家》22 期(HK Writer No. 22), Hong Kong：Hong Kong Writers‘ Association, 31-47.
- 2003〈從國族到私情──華語通俗情節劇的變化──《藍與黑》的例子〉(From Nation Building to Private Passion: the Changes in Chinese Melodrama), 《邵氏影視帝國：文化中國的想像》 (Shaw Bros. Enterprise：Cultural China Imaginary) (Taipei: Rye Field Publishing Co., 295-306.
- 2003〈書寫城市〉(Urban writing),第四屆香港文學節論稿匯編 (Papers from Hong Kong Literary Festival), 港藝術發展局Hong Kong Arts Development Council. 71 – 78.
- 2002〈張愛玲與香港〉(Elleen Chang and Hong Kong),《再讀張愛玲》("Rereading Elleen Chang"), Hong Kong：University of Oxford Press, 175-183.
- 2002〈在時差中寫作〉(Writing in Time Differences), 《香港文學》 (Hong Kong Literary Press), No. 208, April 2002, 8-10.
- 2002〈都市文化與香港文學：歷史、範圍與論題〉(Urban Culture and Hong Kong Literature: History, Scopes and Issues), 《作家》(H K Writer), No. 14, Feb, 2002, 95-111.
- 2001〈魯迅的《故事新編》〉(Lu Xun‘s Old Stories Retold), 《香港作家》(Hong Kong Writers) No.5, Oct., 2001, 9-12.
- 2001〈聞一多的「現代」與「中國」〉(Modernity and Nationality in Wen Yidou‘s Poetry),《香港文 學》(Hong Kong Literary Press), No. 201 (September), 40-45.
- 1989〈都市文化與香港文學〉(Urban Culture and Hong Kong Literature), 《當代》(Contemporary), No. 38, 14-23.
- 1987〈西方現代文學對香港小說的影響〉(The Influence of Modernist Literature on Hong Kong Fiction), 《比較文學研究》("Studies in Comparative Literature"), 1:4, 7-16.
- 1987〈鷗外鷗詩中的「陌生化」效果〉(Defamiliarization Effect in Outer Out's Poetry),《八方》(Ba Fang), No. 5. 79-82.
- 1987〈穆旦與現代的「我」〉(Mu Dan and the Modern 'I')《八方》(Ba Fang), No. 6, 148-158.

Editorial Work
Co-editor (with Andrea Riemenschnitter), Legends from the Swiss Alps, Hong Kong, MCCM Creation.
