= Xiaosi =

Lu Wei-luan
- 盧瑋鑾
- Born: 6 February 1939 (age 87); Hong Kong
- Education: Chinese University of Hong Kong, Northcote College of Education, University of Hong Kong
- Occupations: Essayist, educator
- Writing career
- Pen name: Xiaosi, Mingchuan, Lufan 小思, 明川, 盧颿

Lu Wei-luan (simplified Chinese: 卢玮銮; traditional Chinese: 盧瑋鑾; pinyin: Lú Wěiluán; born 1939), better known by her pen name Xiaosi (Chinese: 小思; pinyin: Xiǎosī), is a Hong Kong essayist, educator, and scholar. She also writes under the pseudonyms of Mingchuan (明川) and Lufan (盧颿). Her major publications include Talk on the Way《路上談》(1979), Moving in Daylight Shadows《日影行》(1982), and Notes from Discipleship 《承教小記》(1982). Lu has been an eminent researcher of Hong Kong literature for decades and holds an honorary position at the Hong Kong Literature Research Centre of the Chinese University of Hong Kong. She was also invited to be the columnist of two Hong Kong newspapers, the Sing Tao Daily and the Ming Pao.

== Life ==
Lu was born in Hong Kong in 1939, of Panyu, Guangdong ancestry. She gained a degree in Chinese at the New Asia College of The Chinese University of Hong Kong in 1964. She received her Diploma of Education from the Northcote College of Education in 1965 and began her career in education with a teaching position in secondary school. She later received an MPhil degree at the University of Hong Kong (HKU) in 1981.

Inspired by her teacher Tang Junyi, Lu went to Japan to further pursue her study on contemporary Chinese Literature and worked as a Research Fellow at the Institute for Research in Humanities of Kyoto University in 1973. She continued her career in education as a lecturer in the Chinese Department at HKU in 1978 when she returned from Japan. She later worked in the Department of Chinese Language and Literature at CUHK in 1979, became a professor in 1992 and retired in 2002.

== Academic achievements ==
After her retirement in 2002, Lu continued contributing to Hong Kong Literature and became the Honorary Director of the Hong Kong Literature Research Centre in CUHK. In 2008, she worked as both the adjunct professor at the Centre for East Asian Studies and the Advisor in the Hong Kong Literature Research Centre in the university.

Lu was awarded with the Vice-Chancellor's Exemplary Teaching Award by CUHK in 2000, the Outstanding Educator Award by the Hong Kong Institute of Education in 2003, and the Award for Outstanding Contribution in Arts from the Hong Kong Arts Development Council in 2010.

== Family background ==
Lu is the second child and has an elder brother. Before her education in formal primary school, she was already in touch with traditional Chinese culture as a result of her mother's influence. Her mother taught and read her various Chinese classics, such as Water Margin and Three Character Classic. Lu's father focused more on exploring nature. He frequently took her hiking and encouraged her to observe nature closely. The short, yet profound teaching from her parents had built up her interest in Chinese literature and greatly influenced her writings. However, her parents both died when she was in primary school.

== Life as an educationist ==
=== Inspiration from Tang Junyi ===
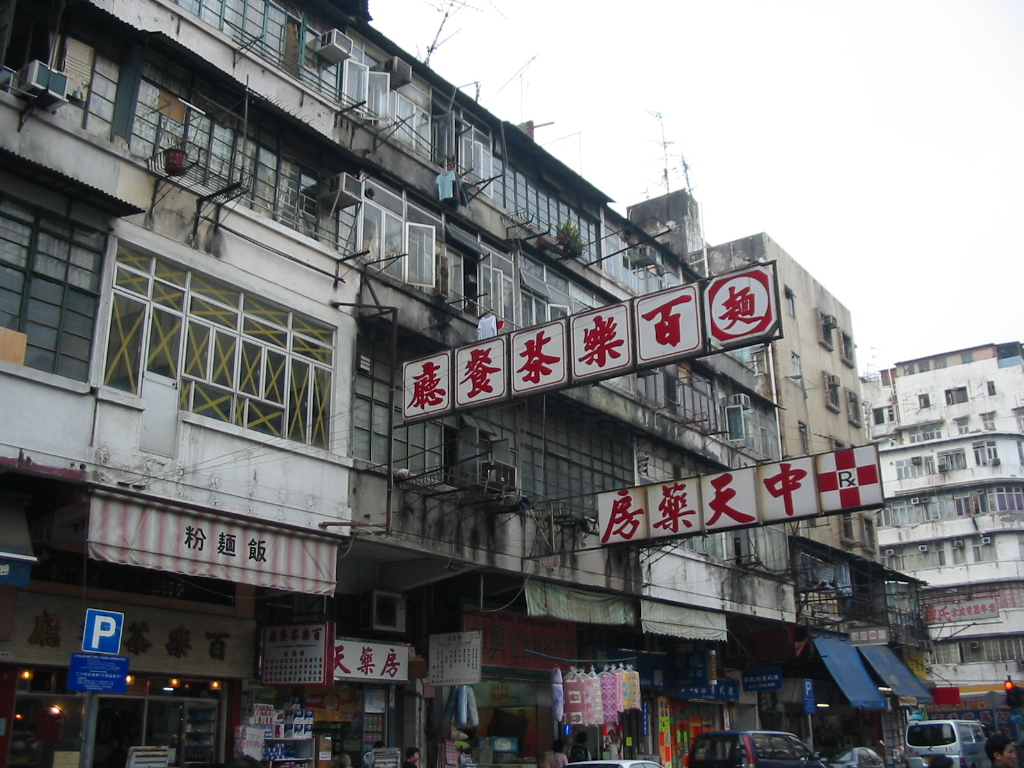
Old campus of New Asia College at Kweilin Street, Sham Shui Po.

In Lu's early years, she lost both her parents and her brother. Mo Ke-fei, Lu's teacher in secondary school, introduced her to read Tang's The Sequel of Experience of Life《人生之體驗》. This book inspired her to study at New Asia College. There, Tang Jun-yi was not only Lu's teacher, but also her mentor. She later became Tang's student. After graduation, she started her teaching career in a secondary school. In 1971, following a loss of faith in teaching she took a break from teaching, at Tang's suggestion, in order to review and evaluation herself. It led to her decision to study in Japan in 1973, which became a turning point in her life.

Tang's teaching motto and his New Confucianism have greatly influenced Lu's teaching and writings. According to Tang, teaching a student is similar to "carrying a student to walk near the edge of a cliff". The idea that teachers should look out for danger for their students was deep-rooted in Lu's mind. She wanted to pass this on to the next generation. She also believed that it was important for students to honor their teachers and respect their teaching. The idea of New Confucianism could be found in many of her writings. She reminds people not to blindly follow traditions. Instead, she believes that people should learn to find the balance between conformity to social norms and rebellion against inequality.

=== Inspiration in Japan ===
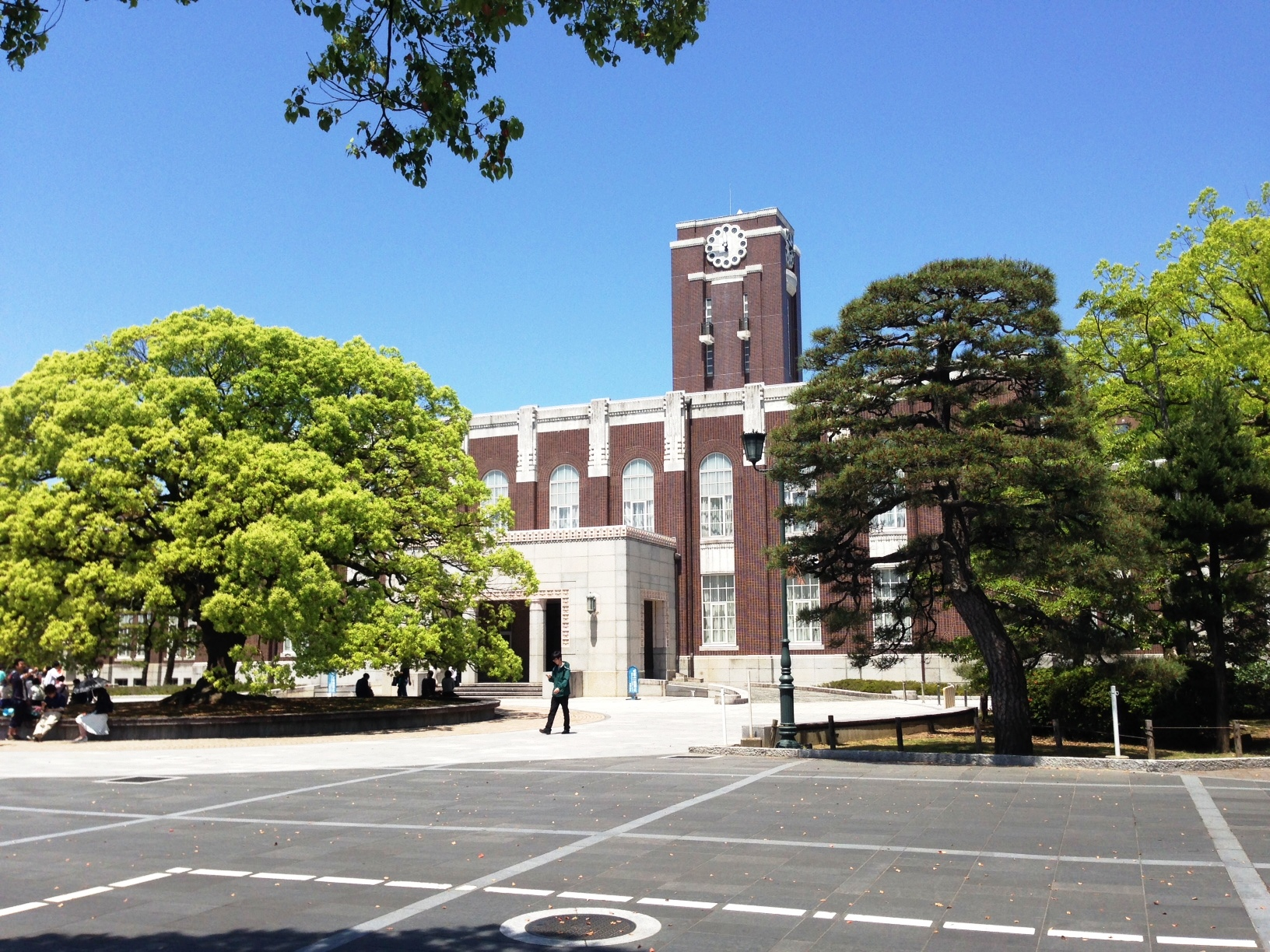
The campus of Kyoto University

In 1973, Lu went to Japan to further pursue her study on contemporary Chinese Literature at the Institute for Research in Humanities of Kyoto University. She admired the Japanese culture, in which the study and development of humanities and literature are highly respected. During her study in Japan, she was amazed by the teaching methods in Japan, where learning is not limited to the classroom but also takes place through traveling. It was also remarkable that most of the published literature and newspapers are carefully preserved in universities’ libraries. This inspired her to later found the Hong Kong Literature Research Centre and establish the Hong Kong Literature Collection in CUHK.

While in Japan, Lu saw her life in Hong Kong from a different perspective and she had a strong sense of nostalgia. The students in Japan reminded her of her Hong Kong students and her life as a teacher there. She regained her confidence in teaching and developed a new determination to preserve and pass on knowledge in Hong Kong.

== Themes of writing ==
=== Patriotism ===
Lu especially opposed militarism in Japan. Many of her writings revealed her anti-war and patriotic feelings. In Thoughts in Kyoto《京都雜想》, the monument commemorating the end of Sino-Japanese War in Japan is used as a ironic symbol of militarism in Japan. She reminds people not to forget history. However, despite the great sorrow and sadness brought by the Japanese invasion, she believed that people should learn to move forwards. Again, in Forgiveness《不記恨》, although the sorrow of the Sino-Japanese War is addressed, she urges people not to be trapped in the past. Forgiveness, Lu says, is crucial to lead people to a better future.

=== Nostalgia ===
Lu witnessed the gradual transformation of Hong Kong from an industrial city to an international financial center. With modernization, the rent for local shops increased from year to year, and many small local businesses could hardly survive. Business in Hong Kong has entered a stage of homogenization. The loss of local colors brought out the nostalgia for Lu. Many of her writings demonstrate her nostalgia towards the old Hong Kong. In the Life of Teaching《一生承教》, Lu points out people's neglect of Hong Kong local colors and reminds people not to treasure a thing only when they have lost it. Instead, we should treasure things which still exist.

== Style of writing ==
=== Metaphors ===
As influenced by her father in exploring nature, Lu uses metaphors in relating the nature of different insects to humanities. In Cicada《蟬》, by describing the special characteristics and nature of a cicada, Lu points out the core value of a teacher. To her, the life of a cicada is similar to the life of a teacher. Teachers are crucial in passing the knowledge to the next generation.

Metaphors were also used to introduce Tang's idea of New Confucianism. In Moth《蛾》 and Snail《蝸牛》 Lu took these as metaphors for people. In Moth《蛾》, the moths' habit of flying towards a flame is regarded as a fatal attraction. They are attracted to light, which repeatedly leads to their death caused by fire. Similarly, in Snail《蝸牛》, snails use only their feelers to move forward and refuse to leave the road. This stubborn nature leads to the death of the snails, and they are repeatedly mashed by humans or cars. These natures of moths and snails are similar to people who blindly follow social conventions and repeatedly make the same mistakes as they did in the past. Through the use of metaphor, Lu urges people to change and critically examine the rationality of these practices.

== Publications ==
Lu has published a total of 21 books and stopped writing in 2014. The books are as follow:

Pseudonym Used	Book Title	Year of Publication	Publisher
Mingchuan (明川)	《豐子愷漫畫選繹》	1980	純一出版社
Xiaosi (小思)	《日影行》	1982	山邊社
Xiaosi (小思)	《承教小記》	1983	明川出版社
Lu Wei-luan (盧瑋鑾)	《香港的憂鬱：文人筆下的香港（1925-1941）》	1983	華風書局
Xiaosi (小思)	《不遷》	1985	華漢文化
Xiaosi (小思)	《香港文縱──內地作家南來及其文化活動》	1987	華漢文化
Xiaosi (小思)	《今夜星光燦爛》	1990	漢藝色硏
Xiaosi (小思)	《彤雲箋》	1990	華漢文化
Lu Wei-luan (盧瑋鑾)	《香港文學散步》	1991	商務出版社
Xiaosi (小思)	《人間清月》	1993	獲益
Lu Wei-luan (盧瑋鑾)	《不老的繆思：中國現當代散文理論》	1993	天地
Xiaosi (小思)	《舊路行人：中國學生周報文輯》	1997	次文化堂
Xiaosi (小思)	《路上談》	1997	山邊社
Xiaosi (小思)	《香港家書》	2002	牛津出版社
Xiaosi (小思)	《香港故事》	2002	牛津出版社
Xiaosi (小思)	《夜讀閃念》	2002	牛津出版社
Xiaosi (小思)	《一生承教》	2007	三聯書店
Xiaosi (小思)	《翠拂行人袖》精選集	2013	中華書局
Xiaosi (小思)	《縴夫的腳步》	2014	中華書局
Xiaosi (小思)	《我思故鄉在》	2014	啟思出版社
Lu Wei-luan (盧瑋鑾)	《香港文化眾聲道（第一冊）》	2014	三聯書店
