= Significance =

Significance is a synonym for importance. It can also refer to:

- Significance (magazine), a magazine published by the Royal Statistical Society and the American Statistical Association
- Significance (policy debate), a stock issue in policy debate
- Significant figures or significant digits, the precision of a numerical value
- Statistical significance, the extent to which a result is unlikely to be due to chance alone

== See also ==
- Meaning (disambiguation)
- Significand, part of a number in floating-point representation
