= Stewart Sloan =

Hong Kong novelist

Stewart Sloan is a Hong Kong horror novelist. He wrote the horror novels The Sorceress and The Isle of the Rat and co-authored Temutma with Rebecca Bradley.

== Biography ==
John Sloan is a horror story writer who uses the pen name Stewart Sloan. He is the third generation in his family to live in Hong Kong. A book published in 1994 said Sloan had lived in Hong Kong for 40 years. He authored The Sorceress and The Isle of the Rat, two horror fiction books that were published by Hong Kong Horrors in 1994. The Sorceress depicts "the main character, a congee-eater, [who] is surrounded by monks who devour peanuts with the gusto of a carnivore eyeing a blood-rare steak".

In 1998, Sloan wrote the novel Temutma with Rebecca Bradley. A German translation of the book was published in 2000 and a 55-minute German radio play aired on 1LIVE in 2002. Temutma takes place around 1991 and 1992 when the Hong Kong government was making arrangements for destroying Kowloon Walled City. People in the story try to defeat the Kowloon Walled City-based primeval monster Temutma, who had been aroused from its slumber. The scholar Calvin Fung called the novel "a fin de siècle Gothic novel" and said it "makes use of the history of Kowloon Walled City to explore the anxieties and fears related to Hong Kong’s unstable future." He continued, "The people of Hong Kong have for now overcome the challenge of the 1997 fin de siècle, but, with Temutma’s undeath, Bradley and Sloan can be seen as intimating the cultural stress to be faced by Hong Kong as we approach 2047, the year assigned for Hong Kong’s contractual reunification with China." Writing for the Hong Kong English Literature Database, the scholar Elaine Ho said, "Temutma's gothic fantasy about Hong Kong under the Chinese vampire also inscribes an utopian 'east meets west' teleology toward an identity subject to time – long-term residency – but is also liberated from historical bloodlust and conflicts of race, gender and ethnicity." South China Morning Post said the book was "page-turning" and "thrilling" and had "intelligent writing and suspsense, suspense, suspense".

Sloan was a civilian employee of the Royal Hong Kong Police Force for 11 years and was employed by the Asian Human Rights Commission in 2009.

== Bibliography ==
- Sloan, Stewart (1994). The Sorceress. Hong Kong: Hong Kong Horrors. ISBN 978-9-62-793201-7.
- Sloan, Stewart (1994). The Isle of the Rat. Hong Kong: Hong Kong Horrors. ISBN 978-9-62-793203-1.
- Sloan, Stewart (1998). Temutma. Hong Kong: Hong Kong Horrors. ISBN 978-9-62-716047-2.
- Sloan, Stewart (2007). May the Force be With You. Hong Kong: Hong Kong Horrors. ISBN 978-9-88-989491-7.
