= Albert Tam =

Hong Kong sci-fi writer

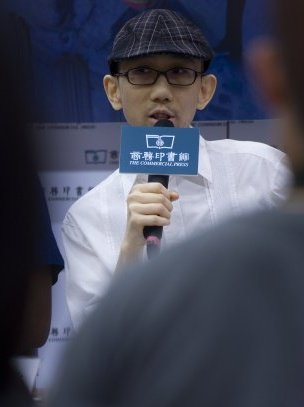
- Education: University of London (BSc); University of Bradford (MBA)
- Occupation: Writer
- Writing career
- Genres: Science fiction and fantasy, crime and mystery
- Notable work: Humanoid Software
- Website: www.mysterytam.com

Albert Tam, born in 1972 in Hong Kong, is a genre fiction writer who writes in the Chinese language. His notable works span across various genres and have earned him many awards in Hong Kong, Taiwan, and mainland China. He is best known for his Humanoid Software series, which won the Best Saga Novel at the 1st Xingyun (Nebula) Awards in China in 2010. Currently, he resides in Hong Kong.

== Education ==
Tam has a degree in computer science and earned his MBA from the University of Bradford.

== Career ==
His debut story, Illusion and Reality, won the third prize in the Sun Ya Literature Award for Youth Adults and Children. He won the first prize with Sunset People next Year. His novel, Broken Pieces, received a special recommendation from Professor Chang Shi-kuo in the Youth Literary Science Fiction Award in 1993. In 1995, Tam created a website to host his creative works, experimenting with online publication. His work, Free City Anxiety Disorders, was shortlisted for the Ni Kuang Science Fiction Award in 2007. His novels were also shortlisted for the Comic Ritz Million Novel Award and the BenQ Award. He has also obtained sponsorship from the Taipei Literature Award. His other notable works include Melody of the Night, which was shortlisted for the Chiu Ko 30th Anniversary Two-Million Novel Award (2008). Raster Murder Case was shortlisted for the Best Saga Novel at the 6th Xingyun (Nebula) Awards in China in 2015. The Cat Whisperer is a fantasy series based on the history and culture of Tainan and was chosen by the Taiwan Culture Ministry as one of the annual recommended titles of XMediaMatch From Book to Screen in 2018. He was one of the featured writers at the Hong Kong Book Fair in 2019.

== Humanoid Software ==
"Humanoid Software is a widely acclaimed science fiction written by the Hong Kong writer Albert Tam in 2010. The story reflects the haunting belief that human being in one day will be subservient to technology. Within a limited amount of hours of imitating its master's behavior, the humanoid software will be able to perform the tasks programmed by its master through automatic technology. As the story unfolds, one day the software suddenly realizes that his master became the victim of a homicide in a series of social chaos, which includes terrorist attacks, invasion of highly secured networks by hackers etc. The theme of Software humanoid resonates closely with many award-winning science fictions, for instance Neuromancer, Snow Crash, Accelerando." By Uganda Sze Pui Kwan.
