= Rebecca Bradley (novelist) =

Canadian novelist and archaeologist

Rebecca Bradley is a Canadian novelist and archaeologist, with a doctorate in archaeology from the University of Cambridge. She was selected for the gift-child Berg Science Seminars program while living in Vancouver, B.C. She is best known for her fantasy trilogy consisting of The Lady in Gil (1996) and its two sequels Scion's Lady (1997) and Lady Pain (1998, all published by Gollancz).

While previously living in Hong Kong, Bradley wrote two books of short stories, Hong Kong Macabre and Hong Kong Grotesque (both published by Hong Kong Horrors), and co-wrote Temutma (Asia 2000, 1998) with Stewart Sloan. Both Temutma and the Gil trilogy have also been published in German translations.

In 2007 Bradley published a collection of short stories entitled The Lateral Truth: An Apostate's Bible Stories (Scroll Press).

More recently, The Lateral Truth: An Apostate's Bible Stories was picked up and re-released by Onus Books, with a foreword by Benjamin Blake Speed Watkins. In 2015, she released Cadon, Hunter and From Hades with love (as a collection of her Hong Kong horror stories) through Loom, with her Gil series also re-released by Loom in ebook format.
