= Insignificance: Hong Kong Stories =

2018 collection of short stories by Xu Xi

First edition

Insignificance: Hong Kong Stories is a 2018 collection of short stories by Xu Xi, published by Signal 8 Press. The book has eleven stories total.

Xu Xi wrote the collection before she planned to move to the United States, and the title indicates her goodbye to Hong Kong. Richard Lord of the South China Morning Post stated that since the book has its principal characters have a "deeply conflicted relationship" with Hong Kong itself as well as the book having elements of familial issues, the question of a person's identity, sexual issues, and "verbal cruelty", it is of the typical style of the author. The book specifically includes content about the identities of Hong Kong people.

== Contents ==
The stories include criticism of economic inequality, racism, and other contemporary issues in Hong Kong. Yang Jing of Nanjing Normal University stated that "colonial vestiges" appear throughout the stories. Death is a common element in these stories, and Lord stated that overall the collection is "not terribly cheerful, although in places it is very witty."

"Longevity’s Eyebrow", the first story in the book, involves a white man named Jonathan Bracken seducing his friend, an ethnic Chinese woman named Stella Yuen, who serves as the story's narrator, and who had not been previously engaging in sex. Lord described Bracken as "an instantly recognisable Xu Xi Lothario, oozing white-man entitlement."

"Off the Record" involves the Umbrella Movement, and the narrator becomes interested in having sex with a potential client after formerly having a lack of interest in sex altogether. The story includes a quote made by Mao Zedong.

In "Mariner" a Hong Konger named Dirk engages in a conversation with an American pilot named Bobby whilst at a bar. Dirk misses talking to Bobby after he leaves even though he initially dislikes talking to him; Lord describes Bobby as "outgoing" and "conservative".

"15th anniversary", which has income inequality as its main theme, stars Christopher Woo, an alumnus of La Salle College who has a lower income existence while his fellow former classmates at his 15th anniversary school reunion have higher socioeconomic levels. Lord states that the story is "a beautifully nuanced, richly associative, haunting portrait of a defeated man" while he describes Woo as "one of the [...] most memorable creations" in Insignificance.

In "Canine News" Xu Xi uses her metaphor of racism as a disease, having a proposal to erect "The Doghouse" and imprison people with racist views there. In the story the narrator suggests that a severely low minimum wage is the reason why a bar in Tsim Sha Tsui does not have a good vibe. According to Lord, "Canine News" is "semi-autobiographical". Yang Jing describes the story as "Swiftian", and Lord stated the story has several of the "most sardonic swipes at" Hong Kong present in Insignificance. Another story, "Doghouse Rhapsody" discusses various possible sources for racism.

The final story is "All About Skin," in which characters decide to change the colours of their own skin upon learning they could do so. This story continues the racism as a disease metaphor, and also discusses perceived triviality of beauty, consumerism, and the relations between countries. Lord characterises it as experimental.

== Reception ==
Lord gave the book four of five stars and stated that the author "remains both evocative and efficient as a delineator of character".
