= Hon Lai-chu =

Hong Kong writer

Hon Lai-chu (Chinese: 韓麗珠, born 1978) is a Hong Kong writer. She has authored eight books in Chinese and won numerous awards, including the Hong Kong Biennial Award for Chinese Literature for fiction, Taiwan's Unitas New Writer's Novella first prize, and the Hong Kong Book Prize. Her books have twice been named to the list of Top Ten Chinese Novels Worldwide, in 2008 and 2009.

Hon's clean, absurd and abstract style has been compared to Franz Kafka, and her intensely psychological stories often reflect her characters’ inner struggles for freedom, against the futility of attempts to find meaning in everyday existence; to Hon's characters, the “way out” lies in transformation that comes from overturning established identities.

== Writing career ==
Hon's 2006 story The Kite Family (《風箏家族》), first published as a novella, won the New Writer's Novella first prize from Taiwan's Unitas Literary Association and the extended version was named one of 2008's Books of the Year by China Times in Taiwan. The Kite Family, and Hon's next work, Gray Flower (《灰花》), were selected as Top 10 Chinese Novels World-wide for the years 2008 and 2009 respectively. A Dictionary of Two Cities (《雙城辭典》), which she co-authored with Dorothy Tse Hiu-hung (謝曉虹), another Hong Kong writer, was published in 2013. Hon and Tse were awarded the 2013 Hong Kong Book Prize for A Dictionary of Two Cities.

Her first full-length book in English, The Kite Family, will be published in 2015 by Hong Kong publisher Muse. It is a translation of her earlier Chinese book 《風箏家族》, translated by Andrea Lingenfelter. and was awarded a translation grant from the U.S. National Endowment for the Arts.

Hon Lai-chu was a 2010 resident at The University of Iowa's International Writing Program in 2011. She was a participant in the 2009 Shenzhen & Hong Kong Bi-city Biennale Special Project "Odyssey: Architecture and Literature", organised by Ou Ning.
