= Fleurs des lettres =

Chinese bi-monthly youth literature magazine

Fleurs des lettres (Chinese: 字花; pinyin: Zi Hua) is a Chinese bi-monthly youth literature magazine. It is supported by The Hong Kong Arts Development Council.

== Publication ==
Launched in April 2006, Fleurs des Lettres is now one of the literature magazines in Hong Kong.

The mission of the magazine was set at the beginning as 'rooting local, exploring the world'. It aimed to cast away from the rigid form of local literature magazines to show how youthful, vivid and diversified a literature magazine could be. It has created an unconventional literature aura and gained appreciation from readers. The founding editors of Fleurs des lettres were some of Hong Kong's most prominent young writers, including Dorothy Tse, Tang Siu-wa and Hon Lai-chu.

Fleurs des Lettres arrived in Taiwan in November 2007 and has influenced local literary circles in Taiwan.

== Education ==
In order to enhance the enthusiasm of youth for literary writing in Chinese, Fleurs des Lettres has co-designed and co-organized the 'Get It Write!' education programme with The Robert H. N. Ho Family Foundation. The programme emphasizes the participation of students in class, through a series of writing activities incorporating photography, drama and community-based research.

Fleurs des Lettres and The Robert H. N. Ho Family Foundation have also co-organized a Writing Education Workshop which provides comprehensive training for young writers.
