= Xu Xi (writer) =

Hong Kong novelist (born 1954)

- 許素細
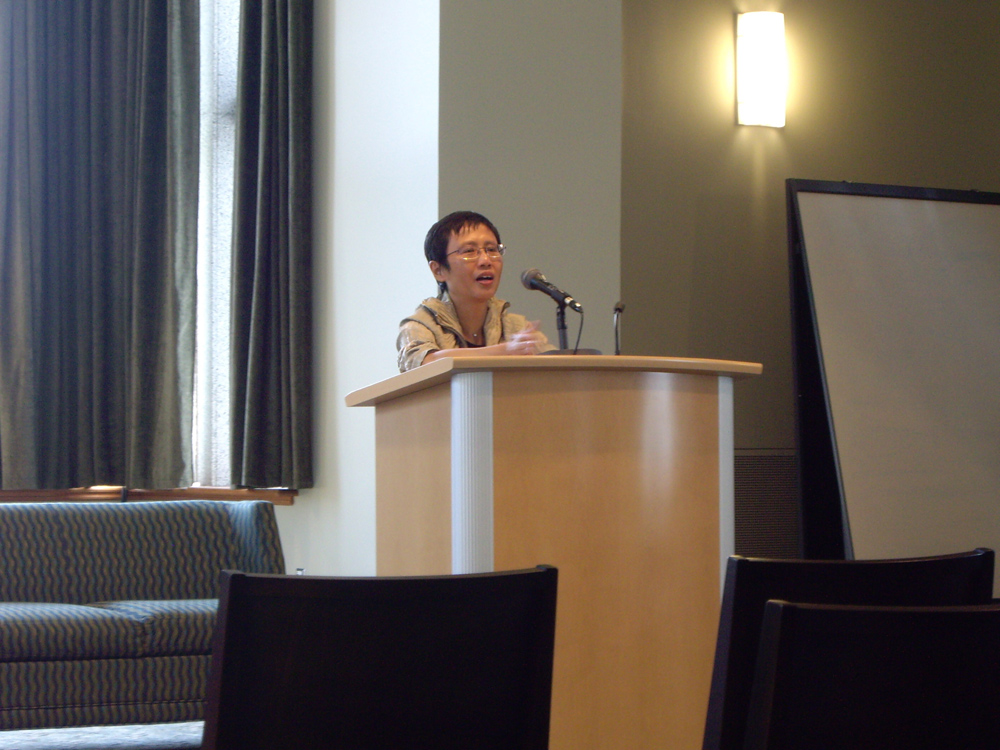
- Xu Xi in 2009
- Born: Xu Su Xi 许素细; 1954 (age 71–72)
- Citizenship: Hong Kong
- Occupation: Author
- Writing career
- Pen name: Sussy Chakó
- Language: English
- Website: xuxiwriter.com

Xu Su Xi
- Traditional Chinese: 許素細
- Simplified Chinese: 许素细
Transcriptions
Standard Mandarin
- Hanyu Pinyin: Xǔ Sùxì
Yue: Cantonese
- Jyutping: heoi2 sou3 sai3

Xu Xi (born 1954, originally named Xu Su Xi (许素细) also published as Sussy Chakó) is an English-language author and lecturer from Hong Kong.

She has been the Hong Kong regional editor of Routledge's Encyclopedia of Post-colonial Literature (second edition, 2005) and the editor or co-editor of the following anthologies of Hong Kong writing in English: City Voices: Hong Kong Writing in English 1945 to the Present (2003), City Stage: Hong Kong Playwriting in English (2005), and Fifty-Fifty: New Hong Kong Writing (2008).

== Biography ==
Xu Xi is an Indonesian Chinese raised in Hong Kong. She worked in international marketing and management in Asia and North America until 1998, when she began writing and teaching full-time. She is a graduate of the MFA Program for Poets & Writers at the University of Massachusetts Amherst. Now a U.S. citizen, she served as faculty chair of the MFA fiction and creative nonfiction faculty at Vermont College in Montpelier from 2009 to 2012.

In 2010, she became writer-in-residence at the Department of English of City University of Hong Kong, where she established and directed the first low-residency MFA programme that specializes in Asian writing. In 2015, the university's decision to close the programme, at a time when freedoms in Hong Kong were felt to be under threat, drew criticism locally and from the international writing establishment.

Xu Xi is based between Hong Kong, where she works, and New York.

== Honours ==
The New York Times named Xu Xi a pioneer English-language writer from Asia, and the Voice of America featured her in their Chinese-language TV series Cultural Odyssey. Her 2010 novel, Habit of a Foreign Sky, was shortlisted for the Man Asian Literary Prize. Her short story "Famine", first published in Ploughshares, was selected for the 2006 O. Henry Prize, and she was a South China Morning Post story contest winner. She has received a New York Foundation for the Arts fiction fellowship, and she has held several writer-in-residence positions, including at Lingnan University in Hong Kong; Chateau de Lavigny in Lausanne, Switzerland; Kulturhuset USF in Bergen, Norway; and the Jack Kerouac Writers in Residence Project of Orlando, Inc. In 2009, she was the Bedell Distinguished Visiting Writer at the University of Iowa's nonfiction writing program, and she was the 2010 Distinguished Asian Writer at the Philippines National Writing Workshops at Silliman University, Dumaguete.

Xu Xi's work has received international acclaim: her short story collection Daughters of Hui made it into Asiaweek's 1996 top ten books; her 2000 novel The Unwalled City was a Pushcart editor's choice and was named one of HK Magazine's top fifteen best books about Hong Kong; and her essay "The English of My Story" was selected for the Notable Essays & Literary Nonfiction list in The Best American Essays in 2016.

== Bibliography ==
- Chinese Walls. Typhoon Media Ltd. 1994. ISBN 978-988-19-5344-5.
- Daughters of Hui. Typhoon Media Ltd. 1996. ISBN 978-988-19-5347-6.
- Hong Kong Rose (1997); Asia 2000, ISBN 978-962-7160-55-7; Chameleon Press, 2005, ISBN 978-988-97060-5-0
- The Unwalled City. Typhoon Media Ltd. 2000. ISBN 978-988-19-5343-8.
- History's Fiction: Stories from the City of Hong Kong, Chameleon Press, 2001, ISBN 978-1-387-80215-9
- Overleaf Hong Kong: Stories & Essays of the Chinese, Overseas, Chameleon Press, 2005, ISBN 978-988-97060-6-7
- Evanescent Isles: From My City-Village. Hong Kong University Press. 2008. ISBN 978-962-209-946-3.
- Habit of a Foreign Sky, Haven Books, 2010, ISBN 978-988-18-9672-8
- Access Thirteen Tales, Signal 8 Press, 2011, ISBN 978-988-15161-9-0
- That Man in Our Lives, C&R Press, 2016, ISBN 978-1-936196-50-0
- Interruptions: with photographs by David Clarke and essays by Xu Xi, HKU Museum and Art Gallery, 2016, ISBN 978-9881902313
- Dear Hong Kong: An Elegy for a City, Penguin, 2017 ISBN 978-0734399380
- Insignificance: Hong Kong Stories, Signal 8 Press, 2018, ISBN 978-9887794868
- This Fish Is Fowl: Essays of Being, University of Nebraska Press, 2019, ISBN 978-1496206824
