= Dorothy Tse =

Hong Kong author and editor (born 1977)

Dorothy Tse Hiu-hung (Chinese: 謝曉虹, born 1977) is a Hong Kong author, editor, and associate professor of creative writing at Hong Kong Baptist University.

== Writing career ==
Dorothy Tse writes primarily in Chinese. Her first short story collection, So Black (《好黑》), was published in 2005, winning the Hong Kong Biennial Award for Chinese Literature the following year. In 2011, she attended The University of Iowa's International Writing Program, and in 2013, A Dictionary of Two Cities (《雙城辭典》), a novel which she co-authored with Hon Lai-chu (韓麗珠), was published, for which Hon and Tse were awarded the 2013 Hong Kong Book Prize. Her literary prizes also include Taiwan's Unitas New Fiction Writers’ Award and the Hong Kong Award for Creative Writing in Chinese.

Tse's first English short story, "Woman Fish", a surreal story about a man whose wife turns into a fish, appeared in 2013 in The Guardian. Her first full-length book in English, Snow and Shadow, was published in 2014 by Hong Kong publisher Muse. Snow and Shadow is a collection of short stories from her earlier Chinese books, as well as previously unpublished works, translated by Nicky Harman.

Tse's first solo novel, Owlish, about a professor who falls in love with a mechanical ballerina, was published in Chinese by Aquarius (寶瓶文化) in 2020. In 2023, Natascha Bruce's translation of the novel into English was published by Fitzcarraldo Editions in the UK and Graywolf Press in the US. In addition to being nominated for the Taipei International Book Exhibition Book Price, the latter translation was awarded a PEN/Heim Translation Fund Grant.

It was also a finalist for the 2023 National Book Critics Circle’s Barrios Book in Translation Prize and named a New Yorker and Words Without Borders Best Book of 2023.

== Influences and themes ==
Tse writes in a surrealist style. Harman describes her writing as: “surreal tales—fantastic in parts—but made the more effective for being grounded firmly in reality... Dreamscapes interlock with a narrative which, though superficially realistic, itself feels quite unreal.” Similarly, Kit Fan notes in a review of Owlish that the novel inhabits an "uncanny realm in which fiction becomes a series of Russian dolls combining dream and reality."

Acknowledging Tse's many references to the Western canon in the novel, which include "Mephistopheles, Kant, the Brothers Grimm, Lewis Carroll, Kafka, Orwell and Tchaikovsky’s Swan Lake", Fan finds "Tse’s acerbic, freewheeling spirit [to be] generically flirtatious, rather than genre-bound." Jane Wallace, meanwhile, has drawn favorable comparisons to the work of E.T.A. Hoffman and Angela Carter, noting along with other critics, however, the extent to which Tse's work is grounded in the unique social and political history of Hong Kong.

== Editorial work ==
Tse is a co-founder of the Hong Kong literary magazine Fleurs des lettres.

== Works in English and other languages ==
- Owlish. Translated by Bruce. Graywolf Press, 2023-06-06
- Owlish. Translated by Natascha Bruce. Fitzcarraldo Editions, 2023
- Owlish. Translated by Natascha Bruce. Scribe, 2023.
- “Quarantine”, n+1. 2023
- “Sour Meat”, That We May Live: Speculative Chinese Fiction. 2020-03-10.
- Il professore e la ballerina del carillon. Translation by Antonio Paoliello. edizioni e/o, 2024.
- Mann im Anzug mit Ballerina. Translated by Marc Hermann. Büchergilde Weltempfänger, 2022.
- City Like Water. Translated by Natascha Bruce. Graywolf Press, 2026.

== Translations ==
Moving a Stone: Selected Poems of Yam Gong. Co-translated with James Shea. 2022. Brookline, MA: Zephyr Press. Bilingual edition in Chinese and English. Selected for the 2022 One City One Book Hong Kong programme organised by The Education University of Hong Kong.

== Awards and honours ==
- Hong Kong Arts Development Awards: 2022 Artist of the Year (Literary Arts).
- Owlish, short-listed for 2021 TiBE.
- A Dictionary of Two Cities, Hong Kong Book Prize, 2013.
- So Black, The 8th Hong Kong Biennial Awards for Chinese Literature, Fiction Category, 2005.
- Owlish, National Book Critics Circle（NBCC）Gregg Barrios Book in Translation Prize Finalist.
- Owlish, Words Without Borders Best Book of 2023.
- Owlish, Times Literary Supplement Books of the Year 2023.
- Owlish, Big Issue Books of the Year 2023.
- Owlish, Long listed for the Warwick Prize for Women in Translation.

== Reviews ==
- Lim, L. (2023, June 6). “owlish” is a darkly fantastical parable about totalitarianism. The New York Times. https://www.nytimes.com/2023/06/06/books/owlish-dorothy-tse.html#:~:text=The%20book%20is%20at%20once,affair%20with%20a%20full%2Dsize
- Guardian News and Media. (2023, February 22). Owlish by Dorothy Tse Review – an anti-fairytale. The Guardian. https://www.theguardian.com/books/2023/feb/22/owlish-by-dorothy-tse-review-an-anti-fairytale
- Waldman, K. (2023, June 5). The perils and potential of the runaway imagination. The New Yorker. https://www.newyorker.com/magazine/2023/06/12/owlish-dorothy-tse-book-review
