= Man Asian Literary Prize =

Annual literary award by the Man Group (2007–2012)

- Awarded for: Best novel written by a citizen of one of select Asian countries, either published in English or translated into English
- Location: Asia (limited)
- Presented by: Man Group
- First award: 2007
- Final award: 2012

The Man Asian Literary Prize was an annual literary award between 2007 and 2012, given to the best novel by an Asian writer, either written in English or translated into English, and published in the previous calendar year. It is awarded to writers who are citizens or residents of one of the following 34 (out of 50) Asian countries: Afghanistan, Bangladesh, Bhutan, Cambodia, China, East Timor, Hong Kong, India, Indonesia, Iran, Kazakhstan, Kyrgyzstan, Japan, Laos, Macau, Malaysia, Mongolia, Myanmar, Nepal, North Korea, Pakistan, Papua New Guinea, Philippines, Singapore, South Korea, Sri Lanka, Taiwan, Tajikistan, Thailand, The Maldives, Turkey, Turkmenistan, Uzbekistan, Vietnam. Submissions are invited through publishers who are entitled to each submit two novels by August 31 each year. Entry forms are available from May.

From 2010 to 2012, the Man Asian Literary Prize awarded USD 30,000 to the author and an additional USD 5,000 to the translator (if any). For the prize of the first three years of its running, from 2007 to 2009, the Man Asian Literary Prize awarded USD 10,000 (author)/ 3,000 USD (translator) to a novel written by an Asian writer of the elective countries, either in English or translated into English, and yet unpublished. Submissions were made by the authors. The reason given by the Prize for the changes introduced in 2010 include the difficulty in finding talented unpublished authors. With the new format, which has shortlisted and winning novels already available to the literary community, media and general public, the Man Asian Literary Prize recognises “the best English works each year by Asian authors and aims to significantly raise international awareness and appreciation of Asian literature.”

The Man Asian Literary Prize was sponsored by Man Group plc., title sponsor of the Man Booker Prize. It was announced in October 2012 that Man Group would no longer sponsor the prize after the 2012 winner was announced in 2013.

== Winners and honorees ==
Year	Result	Author	Work	Original language & translator(s)
2007 (1st); Judging panel: André Aciman; Adrienne Clarkson; Nicholas Jose
2007 (1st); Judging panel: André Aciman; Adrienne Clarkson; Nicholas Jose	Winner	Jiang Rong	Wolf Totem (狼图腾)	Chinese (Howard Goldblatt)
2007 (1st); Judging panel: André Aciman; Adrienne Clarkson; Nicholas Jose	Shortlist			
2007 (1st); Judging panel: André Aciman; Adrienne Clarkson; Nicholas Jose	Shortlist	Jose Dalisay Jr.	Soledad's Sister	
2007 (1st); Judging panel: André Aciman; Adrienne Clarkson; Nicholas Jose	Shortlist	Reeti Gadekar	Families at Home	
2007 (1st); Judging panel: André Aciman; Adrienne Clarkson; Nicholas Jose	Shortlist	Nu Nu Yi	Smile As They Bow (ပြုံး၍လည်း ကန်တော့ခံတော်မူပါ၊ ရယ်၍လည်း ကန်တော့ခံတော်မူပါ)	Burmese (Alfred Birnbaum, Thi Thi Aye)
2007 (1st); Judging panel: André Aciman; Adrienne Clarkson; Nicholas Jose	Shortlist	Xu Xi	Habit of a Foreign Sky	
2007 (1st); Judging panel: André Aciman; Adrienne Clarkson; Nicholas Jose	Longlist	Tulsi Badrinath	The Living God	
2007 (1st); Judging panel: André Aciman; Adrienne Clarkson; Nicholas Jose	Longlist	Sanjay Bahadur	The Sound Of Water	
2007 (1st); Judging panel: André Aciman; Adrienne Clarkson; Nicholas Jose	Longlist	Kankana Basu	Cappuccino Dusk	
2007 (1st); Judging panel: André Aciman; Adrienne Clarkson; Nicholas Jose	Longlist	Sanjiv Bhatla	InJustice	
2007 (1st); Judging panel: André Aciman; Adrienne Clarkson; Nicholas Jose	Longlist	Shahbano Bilgrami	Without Dreams	
2007 (1st); Judging panel: André Aciman; Adrienne Clarkson; Nicholas Jose	Longlist	Saikat Chakraborty	The Amnesiac	
2007 (1st); Judging panel: André Aciman; Adrienne Clarkson; Nicholas Jose	Longlist	Xiaolu Guo	20 Fragments of a Ravenous Youth	
2007 (1st); Judging panel: André Aciman; Adrienne Clarkson; Nicholas Jose	Longlist	Ameena Hussein	The Moon in the Water	
2007 (1st); Judging panel: André Aciman; Adrienne Clarkson; Nicholas Jose	Longlist	Hitomi Kanehara	Autofiction (オートフィクション)	Japanese (David James Karashima)
2007 (1st); Judging panel: André Aciman; Adrienne Clarkson; Nicholas Jose	Longlist	N. S. Madhavan	Litanies of Dutch Battery (ലന്തൻബത്തേരിയിലെ ലുത്തിനിയകൾ)	Malayalam (Rajesh Rajamohan)
2007 (1st); Judging panel: André Aciman; Adrienne Clarkson; Nicholas Jose	Longlist	Laxmi Narayan Mishra	The Little God	
2007 (1st); Judging panel: André Aciman; Adrienne Clarkson; Nicholas Jose	Longlist	Mo Yan	Life and Death Are Wearing Me Out (生死疲劳)	Chinese (Howard Goldblatt)
2007 (1st); Judging panel: André Aciman; Adrienne Clarkson; Nicholas Jose	Longlist	Nalini Rajan	The Pangolin’s Tale	
2007 (1st); Judging panel: André Aciman; Adrienne Clarkson; Nicholas Jose	Longlist	Chiew-Siah Tei	Little Hut of Leaping Fishes	
2007 (1st); Judging panel: André Aciman; Adrienne Clarkson; Nicholas Jose	Longlist	Shreekumar Varma	Maria’s Room	
2007 (1st); Judging panel: André Aciman; Adrienne Clarkson; Nicholas Jose	Longlist	Anuradha Vijayakrishnan	Seeing The Girl	
2007 (1st); Judging panel: André Aciman; Adrienne Clarkson; Nicholas Jose	Longlist	Sujatha Vijayaraghavan	The Silent One	
2007 (1st); Judging panel: André Aciman; Adrienne Clarkson; Nicholas Jose	Longlist	Egoyan Zheng	Fleeting Light	
2008 (2nd); Judging panel: Adrienne Clarkson; Pankaj Mishra; Nicholas Jose
2008 (2nd); Judging panel: Adrienne Clarkson; Pankaj Mishra; Nicholas Jose	Winner	Miguel Syjuco	Ilustrado	
2008 (2nd); Judging panel: Adrienne Clarkson; Pankaj Mishra; Nicholas Jose	Shortlist			
2008 (2nd); Judging panel: Adrienne Clarkson; Pankaj Mishra; Nicholas Jose	Shortlist	Kavery Nambisan	The Story that Must Not be Told	
2008 (2nd); Judging panel: Adrienne Clarkson; Pankaj Mishra; Nicholas Jose	Shortlist	Siddharth Shanghvi	The Lost Flamingoes of Bombay	
2008 (2nd); Judging panel: Adrienne Clarkson; Pankaj Mishra; Nicholas Jose	Shortlist	Yu Hua	Brothers (兄弟)	Chinese (Eileen Cheng-yin Chow, Carlos Rojas)
2008 (2nd); Judging panel: Adrienne Clarkson; Pankaj Mishra; Nicholas Jose	Shortlist	Alfred Yuson	The Music Child	
2008 (2nd); Judging panel: Adrienne Clarkson; Pankaj Mishra; Nicholas Jose	Longlist			
2008 (2nd); Judging panel: Adrienne Clarkson; Pankaj Mishra; Nicholas Jose	Longlist	Tulsi Badrinath	Melting Love	
2008 (2nd); Judging panel: Adrienne Clarkson; Pankaj Mishra; Nicholas Jose	Longlist	Hans Billimoria	Ugly tree	
2008 (2nd); Judging panel: Adrienne Clarkson; Pankaj Mishra; Nicholas Jose	Longlist	Ian Casocot	Sugar Land	
2008 (2nd); Judging panel: Adrienne Clarkson; Pankaj Mishra; Nicholas Jose	Longlist	Han Dong	Banished! (扎根)	Chinese (Nicky Harman)
2008 (2nd); Judging panel: Adrienne Clarkson; Pankaj Mishra; Nicholas Jose	Longlist	Anjum Hasan	Neti, Neti	
2008 (2nd); Judging panel: Adrienne Clarkson; Pankaj Mishra; Nicholas Jose	Longlist	Daisy Hasan	The To-Let House	
2008 (2nd); Judging panel: Adrienne Clarkson; Pankaj Mishra; Nicholas Jose	Longlist	Abdullah Hussein	The Afghan Girl	
2008 (2nd); Judging panel: Adrienne Clarkson; Pankaj Mishra; Nicholas Jose	Longlist	Tsutomu Igarashi	To the Temple	
2008 (2nd); Judging panel: Adrienne Clarkson; Pankaj Mishra; Nicholas Jose	Longlist	Rupa Krishnan	Something Wicked This Way Comes	
2008 (2nd); Judging panel: Adrienne Clarkson; Pankaj Mishra; Nicholas Jose	Longlist	Murong Xuecun	Leave Me Alone, Chengdu (成都，今夜请将我遗忘)	Chinese (Harvey Thomlinson)
2008 (2nd); Judging panel: Adrienne Clarkson; Pankaj Mishra; Nicholas Jose	Longlist	Sumana Roy	Love in the Chicken's Neck	
2008 (2nd); Judging panel: Adrienne Clarkson; Pankaj Mishra; Nicholas Jose	Longlist	Vaibhav Saini	On the Edge of Pandemonium	
2008 (2nd); Judging panel: Adrienne Clarkson; Pankaj Mishra; Nicholas Jose	Longlist	Salma	Midnight Tales	
2008 (2nd); Judging panel: Adrienne Clarkson; Pankaj Mishra; Nicholas Jose	Longlist	Lakambini Sitoy	Sweet Haven	
2008 (2nd); Judging panel: Adrienne Clarkson; Pankaj Mishra; Nicholas Jose	Longlist	Sarayu Srivatsa	The Last Pretense	
2008 (2nd); Judging panel: Adrienne Clarkson; Pankaj Mishra; Nicholas Jose	Longlist	Amit Varma	My Friend, Sancho	
2009 (3rd); Judging panel: Colm Tóibín; Gish Jen; Pankaj Mishra	Longlist			
2009 (3rd); Judging panel: Colm Tóibín; Gish Jen; Pankaj Mishra	Winner	Su Tong	The Boat to Redemption (河岸)	Chinese (Howard Goldblatt)
2009 (3rd); Judging panel: Colm Tóibín; Gish Jen; Pankaj Mishra	Shortlist			
2009 (3rd); Judging panel: Colm Tóibín; Gish Jen; Pankaj Mishra	Shortlist	Omair Ahmad	Jimmy the Terrorist	
2009 (3rd); Judging panel: Colm Tóibín; Gish Jen; Pankaj Mishra	Shortlist	Siddhartha Chowdhury	Day Scholar	
2009 (3rd); Judging panel: Colm Tóibín; Gish Jen; Pankaj Mishra	Shortlist	Eric Gamalinda	The Descartes Highlands	
2009 (3rd); Judging panel: Colm Tóibín; Gish Jen; Pankaj Mishra	Shortlist	Nitasha Kaul	Residue	
2009 (3rd); Judging panel: Colm Tóibín; Gish Jen; Pankaj Mishra	Longlist			
2009 (3rd); Judging panel: Colm Tóibín; Gish Jen; Pankaj Mishra	Longlist	Gopilal Acharya	With a Stone in My Heart	
2009 (3rd); Judging panel: Colm Tóibín; Gish Jen; Pankaj Mishra	Longlist	Kishwar Desai	Witness the Night	
2009 (3rd); Judging panel: Colm Tóibín; Gish Jen; Pankaj Mishra	Longlist	Samuel Ferrer	The Last Gods of Indochine	
2009 (3rd); Judging panel: Colm Tóibín; Gish Jen; Pankaj Mishra	Longlist	Ram Govardhan	Rough with the Smooth	
2009 (3rd); Judging panel: Colm Tóibín; Gish Jen; Pankaj Mishra	Longlist	Kanishka Gupta	History of Hate	
2009 (3rd); Judging panel: Colm Tóibín; Gish Jen; Pankaj Mishra	Longlist	Kameroon Rasheed Ismeer	Memoirs of a Terrorist	
2009 (3rd); Judging panel: Colm Tóibín; Gish Jen; Pankaj Mishra	Longlist	Ratika Kapur	Overwinter	
2009 (3rd); Judging panel: Colm Tóibín; Gish Jen; Pankaj Mishra	Longlist	Mariam Karim	The Bereavement of Agnes Desmoulins	
2009 (3rd); Judging panel: Colm Tóibín; Gish Jen; Pankaj Mishra	Longlist	Karri Sriram	The Autobiography of a Mad Nation	
2009 (3rd); Judging panel: Colm Tóibín; Gish Jen; Pankaj Mishra	Longlist	R. Zamora Linmark	Leche	
2009 (3rd); Judging panel: Colm Tóibín; Gish Jen; Pankaj Mishra	Longlist	Mario I. Miclat	Secrets of the Eighteen Mansions	
2009 (3rd); Judging panel: Colm Tóibín; Gish Jen; Pankaj Mishra	Longlist	Clarissa V. Militante	Different Countries	
2009 (3rd); Judging panel: Colm Tóibín; Gish Jen; Pankaj Mishra	Longlist	Varuna Mohite	Omigod	
2009 (3rd); Judging panel: Colm Tóibín; Gish Jen; Pankaj Mishra	Longlist	Dipika Mukherjee	Thunder Demons	
2009 (3rd); Judging panel: Colm Tóibín; Gish Jen; Pankaj Mishra	Longlist	Hena Pillai	Blackland	
2009 (3rd); Judging panel: Colm Tóibín; Gish Jen; Pankaj Mishra	Longlist	Roan Ching-yueh	Lin Xiu-Tzi and her Family	
2009 (3rd); Judging panel: Colm Tóibín; Gish Jen; Pankaj Mishra	Longlist	Edgar Calabia Samar	Eight Muses of the Fall (Walong Diwata ng Pagkahulog)	Filipino (Mikael de Lara Co, Sasha Martinez)
2009 (3rd); Judging panel: Colm Tóibín; Gish Jen; Pankaj Mishra	Longlist	K. Srilata	Table for Four	
2009 (3rd); Judging panel: Colm Tóibín; Gish Jen; Pankaj Mishra	Longlist	Oyungerel Tsedevdamba	Shadow of the Red Star	
2010 (4th); Judging panel: Monica Ali; Homi K. Bhabha; Hsu-Ming Teo
2010 (4th); Judging panel: Monica Ali; Homi K. Bhabha; Hsu-Ming Teo	Winner	Bi Feiyu	Three Sisters (玉米)	Chinese (Howard Goldblatt, Sylvia Li-chun Lin)
2010 (4th); Judging panel: Monica Ali; Homi K. Bhabha; Hsu-Ming Teo	Shortlist			
2010 (4th); Judging panel: Monica Ali; Homi K. Bhabha; Hsu-Ming Teo	Shortlist	Manu Joseph	Serious Men	
2010 (4th); Judging panel: Monica Ali; Homi K. Bhabha; Hsu-Ming Teo	Shortlist	Tabish Khair	The Thing About Thugs	
2010 (4th); Judging panel: Monica Ali; Homi K. Bhabha; Hsu-Ming Teo	Shortlist	Kenzaburō Ōe	The Changeling (取り替え子)	Japanese (Deborah Boliver Boehm)
2010 (4th); Judging panel: Monica Ali; Homi K. Bhabha; Hsu-Ming Teo	Shortlist	Yōko Ogawa	Hotel Iris (ホテル・アイリス)	Japanese (Stephen Snyder)
2010 (4th); Judging panel: Monica Ali; Homi K. Bhabha; Hsu-Ming Teo	Longlist	Upamanyu Chatterjee	Way to Go	
2010 (4th); Judging panel: Monica Ali; Homi K. Bhabha; Hsu-Ming Teo	Longlist	Anosh Irani	Dahanu Road	
2010 (4th); Judging panel: Monica Ali; Homi K. Bhabha; Hsu-Ming Teo	Longlist	Sarita Mandanna	Tiger Hills	
2010 (4th); Judging panel: Monica Ali; Homi K. Bhabha; Hsu-Ming Teo	Longlist	Usha K.R.	Monkey-man	
2010 (4th); Judging panel: Monica Ali; Homi K. Bhabha; Hsu-Ming Teo	Longlist	Criselda Yabes	Below the Crying Mountain	
2011 (5th); Judging panel: Razia Iqbal, chair; Chang-Rae Lee; Vikas Swarup	Longlist			
2011 (5th); Judging panel: Razia Iqbal, chair; Chang-Rae Lee; Vikas Swarup	Winner	Shin Kyung-sook	Please Look After Mom (엄마를 부탁해)	Korean (Chi-young Kim)
2011 (5th); Judging panel: Razia Iqbal, chair; Chang-Rae Lee; Vikas Swarup	Shortlist			
2011 (5th); Judging panel: Razia Iqbal, chair; Chang-Rae Lee; Vikas Swarup	Shortlist	Jamil Ahmad	The Wandering Falcon	
2011 (5th); Judging panel: Razia Iqbal, chair; Chang-Rae Lee; Vikas Swarup	Shortlist	Jahnavi Barua	Rebirth	
2011 (5th); Judging panel: Razia Iqbal, chair; Chang-Rae Lee; Vikas Swarup	Shortlist	Rahul Bhattacharya	The Sly Company of People Who Care	
2011 (5th); Judging panel: Razia Iqbal, chair; Chang-Rae Lee; Vikas Swarup	Shortlist	Amitav Ghosh	River of Smoke	
2011 (5th); Judging panel: Razia Iqbal, chair; Chang-Rae Lee; Vikas Swarup	Shortlist	Yan Lianke	Dream of Ding Village (丁庄梦)	Chinese (Cindy Carter)
2011 (5th); Judging panel: Razia Iqbal, chair; Chang-Rae Lee; Vikas Swarup	Shortlist	Banana Yoshimoto	The Lake (みずうみ)	Japanese (Michael Emmerich)
2011 (5th); Judging panel: Razia Iqbal, chair; Chang-Rae Lee; Vikas Swarup	Longlist			
2011 (5th); Judging panel: Razia Iqbal, chair; Chang-Rae Lee; Vikas Swarup	Longlist	Tahmima Anam	The Good Muslim	
2011 (5th); Judging panel: Razia Iqbal, chair; Chang-Rae Lee; Vikas Swarup	Longlist	Mahmoud Dowlatabadi	The Colonel (زوال کلنل)	Persian (Tom Patterdale)
2011 (5th); Judging panel: Razia Iqbal, chair; Chang-Rae Lee; Vikas Swarup	Longlist	Haruki Murakami	1Q84	Japanese (Jay Rubin, Philip Gabriel)
2011 (5th); Judging panel: Razia Iqbal, chair; Chang-Rae Lee; Vikas Swarup	Longlist	Anuradha Roy	The Folded Earth	
2011 (5th); Judging panel: Razia Iqbal, chair; Chang-Rae Lee; Vikas Swarup	Longlist	Tarun Tejpal	The Valley of Masks	
2012 (6th); Judging panel: Maya Jaggi, chair; Monique Truong; Vikram Chandra
2012 (6th); Judging panel: Maya Jaggi, chair; Monique Truong; Vikram Chandra	Winner	Tan Twan Eng	The Garden of Evening Mists	
2012 (6th); Judging panel: Maya Jaggi, chair; Monique Truong; Vikram Chandra	Shortlist			
2012 (6th); Judging panel: Maya Jaggi, chair; Monique Truong; Vikram Chandra	Shortlist	Musharraf Ali Farooqi	Between Clay and Dust	
2012 (6th); Judging panel: Maya Jaggi, chair; Monique Truong; Vikram Chandra	Shortlist	Hiromi Kawakami	The Briefcase (センセイの鞄)	Japanese (Allison Powell)
2012 (6th); Judging panel: Maya Jaggi, chair; Monique Truong; Vikram Chandra	Shortlist	Orhan Pamuk	Silent House (Sessiz Ev)	Turkish (Robert Finn)
2012 (6th); Judging panel: Maya Jaggi, chair; Monique Truong; Vikram Chandra	Shortlist	Jeet Thayil	Narcopolis	
2012 (6th); Judging panel: Maya Jaggi, chair; Monique Truong; Vikram Chandra	Longlist			
2012 (6th); Judging panel: Maya Jaggi, chair; Monique Truong; Vikram Chandra	Longlist	Benyamin	Goat Days (ആടുജീവിതം)	Malayalam (Joseph Koyippally)
2012 (6th); Judging panel: Maya Jaggi, chair; Monique Truong; Vikram Chandra	Longlist	Anjali Joseph	Another Country	
2012 (6th); Judging panel: Maya Jaggi, chair; Monique Truong; Vikram Chandra	Longlist	Uzma Aslam Khan	Thinner Than Skin	
2012 (6th); Judging panel: Maya Jaggi, chair; Monique Truong; Vikram Chandra	Longlist	Kim Thúy	Ru	French (Sheila Fischman)
2012 (6th); Judging panel: Maya Jaggi, chair; Monique Truong; Vikram Chandra	Longlist	Kim Young-ha	Black Flower (검은 꽃)	Korean (Charles La Shure)
2012 (6th); Judging panel: Maya Jaggi, chair; Monique Truong; Vikram Chandra	Longlist	Nayomi Munaweera	Island of a Thousand Mirrors	
2012 (6th); Judging panel: Maya Jaggi, chair; Monique Truong; Vikram Chandra	Longlist	Elif Şafak	Honour	
2012 (6th); Judging panel: Maya Jaggi, chair; Monique Truong; Vikram Chandra	Longlist	Sheng Keyi	Northern Girls: Life Goes On (北妹)	Chinese (Shelly Bryant)
2012 (6th); Judging panel: Maya Jaggi, chair; Monique Truong; Vikram Chandra	Longlist	Roma Tearne	The Road to Urbino	
2012 (6th); Judging panel: Maya Jaggi, chair; Monique Truong; Vikram Chandra	Longlist	Tie Ning	The Bathing Women (大浴女)	Chinese (Hongling Zhang, Jason Sommer)

== See also ==
- Man Booker Prize
- Man Booker International Prize
