= Miguel Syjuco =

Filipino writer (born 1976)

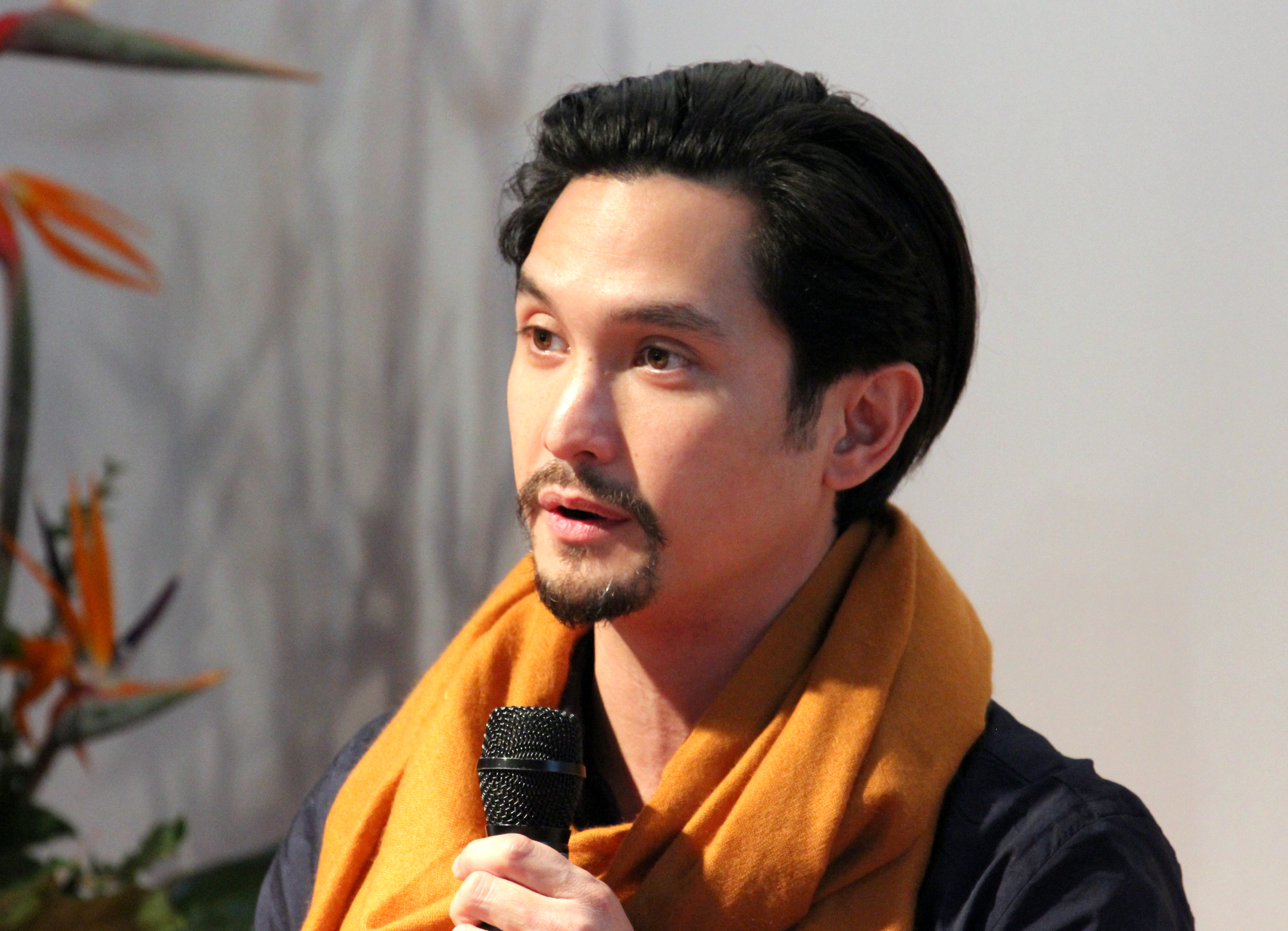
- Syjuco at Frankfurt Book Fair 2015
- Born: Miguel Augusto Gabriel Jalbuena Syjuco; November 17, 1976 (age 49); Metro Manila, Philippines
- Occupation: Writer

Miguel Augusto Gabriel Jalbuena Syjuco (born November 17, 1976) is a Filipino writer from Manila and the grand prize winner of the 2008 Man Asian Literary Prize for his first novel Ilustrado.

== Early life and education ==
Syjuco, the son of Representative Augusto Syjuco Jr. of the second district of Iloilo in the Philippine House of Representatives, and Judy Jalbuena.

Syjuco graduated from high school in 1993 from the Cebu International School. He received a Bachelor of Arts degree in English Literature from the Ateneo de Manila University in 2000 and completed his MFA from Columbia University in 2004. In early 2011 he completed a PhD in literature from the University of Adelaide.

Early in his career, he was a fellow of the 1998 Silliman National Writers Workshop in Dumaguete, Negros Oriental.

== Writing career ==
Even before it was published, Syjuco's debut novel Ilustrado won the Grand Prize for a Novel in English at the 2008 Palanca Awards, the Philippines' highest literary honor. In November of the same year, Syjuco was also awarded the 2008 Man Asian Literary Prize for Ilustrado (titled after the historical Ilustrado class during the Spanish colonial period).

In 2010, the novel won the QWF Paragraphe Hugh MacLennan Prize for Fiction, Quebec's top literary prize, and was a New York Times Notable Book of 2010 as well as a Globe and Mail Top 100 of 2010. The novel was also a finalist for the Commonwealth Writers' Prize, a finalist for the Amazon First Novel Award, and a finalist for the 2010 Grand Prix du Livre de Montreal.

In 2011, Ilustrado joined books by David Mitchell, Aleksandar Hemon, Marie NDiaye, and Wells Tower for the Premio von Rezzori. It was also among the three top finalists for the $55,000 Prix Jan Michalski, an annual Swiss prize for the best international book, as well as the Prix Courrier International, which honors the best international books translated in France.

Ilustrado has been published in 16 languages. In late 2010, the novel was published in Spanish (Tusquets), Swedish (Natur & Kultur), and Dutch (Mouria). In 2011, it was published in Serbian (Geopoetika), French (Editions Christian Bourgois), Catalan (Tusquets), Italian (Fazi), Japanese (Hakusuisha), Czech (Jota), German (Klett-Cotta), and Brazilian Portuguese (Companhia das Letras). The novel is currently taught in university and high school literature classes in the Philippines.

Syjuco is represented by Peter Straus at the Rogers, Coleridge and White Literary Agency in London and by Melanie Jackson in New York City. He has sold a second book to North American publishers.

In 2013, he was a fellow at the Radcliffe Institute for Advanced Studies at Harvard University. In 2014, he served as the International Writer-in-Residence at Nanyang Technological University in Singapore.

He is currently a visiting professor in the Literature and Creative Writing department at New York University Abu Dhabi.

As a journalist, he is a contributing opinion writer for the International New York Times. He was previously a copy editor at The Independent Weekly (Australia) and The Montreal Gazette. His articles have appeared in The New York Times, The Guardian, Time, Newsweek, the International Herald Tribune, The Globe and Mail, The New York Times Book Review, Rappler (Philippines), Esquire, Boston Review, OpenDemocracy, the BBC, the CBC, Inside Higher Ed, and others.

His novel I Was the President's Mistress was published in 2022.
