= Li Rui (writer) =

Chinese writer (born 1949)

Li Rui 李锐
- Born: 1949 (age 76–77); Beijing, China
- Education: Liaoning University
- Occupations: Novelist, short story writer
- Spouse: Jiang Yun
- Children: Di An
- Writing career
- Language: Chinese
- Period: 1974 - present
- Genres: Novel, short story
- Notable works: Silver City; No-Wind Tree; No Clouds for Ten Thousand Miles
- Notable awards: Ordre des Arts et des Lettres; 2004; China Times Literary Prize 8th National Award
- Literary movement: Xungen movement

Li Rui (Chinese: 李锐; pinyin: Li Ruì; born 1949 in Beijing) is a short-story writer and novelist from China. He is best known for his Houtu series of short stories, which won the China Times Literary Prize as well as the 8th National Award for best short stories.

He has published five novels, several novellas and several volumes of short stories. In 2004, Li won the French Ordre des Arts et des Lettres award for his contributions to arts and literature.

In 2007, the Open University of Hong Kong awarded him the degree of D.Litt. honoris causa.
