= Di An (writer) =

Chinese writer

- Born: 1983 (age 42–43); Shanxi, China
- Occupation: Author
- Relatives: Li Rui (father); Jiang Yun (mother)

Li Di An (born 1983), known by her given name Di An (笛安), is a Chinese author. She was born in the Shanxi to parents Li Rui and Jiang Yun, who are both writers. Di An holds a master's degree in sociology from École des hautes études en sciences sociales in Paris and is best known for her book Ashes to Ashes.

== Bibliography ==
- Ashes to Ashes
- Memory in the city of Dragon (2009)
- Memory in the city of Dragon II (2010)
