= Lao She Literary Award =

The Lao She Literary Award (Lao She wenxue jiang 老舍文学奖) is named after the Chinese novelist Lao She, a writer and activist of 20th-century Chinese literature. The award is awarded to a Beijing writer every two to three years, recognising literary excellence in novels, novellas, drama, film, television, and radio. It is sponsored by the Lao She Literature Fund which was founded in 1988. The prize was established in 1999, and was first awarded in 2000. It is Beijing's highest prize for literature and the arts, and is one of the four major literary awards in China, alongside the Mao Dun Prize for Literature, Lu Xun Literary Prize, and the Cao Yu Prize for Playwriting (曹禺戏剧文学奖).

== Winners of the First Awards (2000) ==
=== Outstanding novels ===
- Ling Li (writer) 凌力《梦断关河》
- Liu Yuxin (writer) 刘育新《古街》

=== Outstanding novellas ===
- Liu Heng 刘恒《贫嘴张大民的幸福生活》
- Tie Ning — How Long Is Forever?

=== Outstanding drama scripts ===
- Zhang Yonghe and Wang Baochun 张永和、王保春《烟壶》（曲剧）
- Guo Qihong 郭启宏《司马相如》（昆曲）

=== TV series ===
- Year After Year (screenplay: Li Xiaoming / directors: An Zhanjun, Li Xiaolong) 《一年又一年》（编剧：李晓明，导演：安战军、李小龙）
- Leaving Lei Feng Day (screenplay: Wang Xingdong / directors: Lei Xianwo, Kang Ning) 《离开雷锋的日子》（编剧：王兴东，导演：雷献禾、康宁）
- Backbone (screenplay: Luo Jin / director: Li Jian) 《脊梁》（编剧：罗金，导演：李健）
- Immortal Fame (screenplay: Liu Baoyi / director: Li Jian) 《千古流芳》（编剧：刘宝毅，导演：李健）

== Winners of the Second Awards (2005) ==
=== Outstanding novels ===
- Zhang Jie 张洁《无字》
- Ning Ken 宁肯《蒙面之城》

=== Outstanding novellas ===
- Liu Qingbang 刘庆邦《神木》
- Zeng Zhe 曾哲《一年级二年级》
- Yi Xiangdong 衣向东《初三初四看月亮》

=== Outstanding drama scripts ===
- Li Longyun 李龙云《正红旗下》
- Chen Jianqiu 陈健秋《宰相刘罗锅》（京剧）

== Winners of the Third Awards (2005) ==
=== Outstanding novels ===
- Yan Lianke 阎连科《受活》
- Ning Ken 宁肯《蒙面之城》

=== Outstanding novellas ===
- Zeng Zhe 曾哲《香歌潭》
- Cheng Qing 程青《十周岁》

=== Outstanding drama scripts ===
- Lan Xiaolong 兰晓龙《爱尔纳·突击》

=== Best work by a new writer ===
- Wei Ran 尉然《李大筐的脚和李小筐的爱情》
- Mao Yinpeng 毛银鹏《故人西辞》

== Winners of the Fourth Awards (2011) ==
=== Outstanding novels ===
- Xu Kun 徐坤《八月狂想曲》
- Ning Ken 宁肯《天藏》
- Ma Lihua 马丽华《如意高地》

=== Outstanding novellas ===
- Ye Guangqin 叶广芩《豆汁记》
- Liu Qingbang 刘庆邦《哑炮》
- Jing Yongming 荆永鸣《大声呼吸》
- Zhong Jingjing 钟晶晶《我的左手》

== Winners of the Fifth Awards (2014) ==
=== Outstanding novels ===
- Xu Zechen 徐则臣《耶路撒冷》
- Lin Bai 林白《北去来辞》

=== Outstanding novellas ===
- Wen Zhen 文珍《安翔路情事》
- Jiang Yun 蒋韵《朗霞的西街》
- Jing Yongming 荆永鸣《北京房东》
- Ge Fei 格非《隐身衣》

=== Outstanding drama scripts ===
- Wan Fang 万方《忏悔》（话剧）
- Li Jing 李静《鲁迅》（话剧）
