= Sheng Keyi =

Chinese writer

Sheng Keyi (盛可以, Yiyang, July 4, 1973) is a contemporary Chinese novelist, short story writer, and artist.

== Biography ==
Sheng Keyi is a contemporary Chinese novelist, she was born in a remote village in Yiyang, Hunan. She formerly worked in a securities company, and as a reporter, and editor, among many other occupations.

Sheng's works depict the real lives of China's poor, the survival of its women, and situations revolving around the human spirit, written in a language that is violent, enthusiastic, and experimental. Her writing has been praised by fellow Chinese authors Mo Yan, Yan Lianke and Yu Hua, and she has been reviewed and interviewed in international publications such as the New York Review of Books, The Guardian, Wall Street Journal, and LA Review of Books. She has been awarded many prizes, including the Chinese People's Literature Prize, the Yu Dafu Prize for Fiction, the Chinese Literature Media Award and the Top 20 Novelists of the Future Prize. Her work has been translated into English and many other languages, including French, Italian, Spanish, German, Swedish, Russian, Czech, Polish, Japanese and Korean.

Her works include the novels Northern Girls, Death Fugue and Wild Fruit, as well as the novella Paradise and several short story collections. Northern Girls, published in English by Penguin in 2012, was longlisted for the Man Asian Literary Prize. Death Fugue, banned for publication in mainland China, is a political allegory that “recalls Aldous Huxley’s Brave New World,” according to The New York Times, and “in a tradition that includes George Orwell, Aldous Huxley, Philip K. Dick, Margaret Atwood and other keen critics of human folly,” according to The Washington Post.

Sheng's three recent novels, The Womb, The Metaphor Detox Centre, and Maid's Notes are part of a trilogy on the topic of women's destinies. The Metaphor Detox Centre, however, remains unavailable in mainland China and was released by Taiwanese publisher Linking Publishing.

== List of works ==
Selected collections of short stories and novellas

- Fields of White (《白草地》), Shanghai: Harvest Magazine, 2010. English edition translated by Shelly Bryant: Penguin Specials (2014) ISBN 9780734310507.
- Leaving a Room for You (《留一个房间给你用》), Beijing: Peking Yanshan Press, 2012.
- Why Is Spring Still Not Coming (《春天怎么还不来》), Shanghai: Shanghai Translation Publishing House, 2014.
- Paradise (《福地》), Shanghai: Harvest Magazine, 2016.
- Nostalgia for the Homeland (《怀乡书》), Beijing: Peking University Press, 2018.
- Heavy Body (《沉重的肉身》), Beijing: People's Literature Publishing House, 2021.

Selected novels

- Water and Milk (《水乳》), Shenyang: Chunfeng Literature and Arts, 2003.
- Northern Girls (《北妹》), Wuhan: Changjiang Literature Press, 2004. English edition translated by Shelly Bryant: Viking Press (2012) ISBN 9780670076161.
- Ode to Virtue (《道德颂》), Shanghai: Literature and Arts, 2007.
- Death Fugue (《死亡赋格》), unpublished in China. Taipei: INK Publishing, 2012. English editions translated by Shelly Bryant: Giramondo Publishing (2014) ISBN 9781922146625 and Restless Books (2021) ISBN 9781632062925.
- The Jellyfish (《水母》), Hefei: Anhui Literature and Arts, 2012.
- Wild Fruit(《野蛮生长》), Beijing: October Literature, 2014. English edition translated by Shelly Bryant: Viking Press (2018) ISBN 9780734399014.
- The Metaphor Detox Centre (《锦灰》), unpublished in China. Taipei: Linking Publishing, 2018.
- The Womb (《子宫》), Taipei: Chiu Ko Publishing, 2019. Published as Breathing Earth (《息壤》, xirang) in Beijing: People's Literature Publishing House, 2020.
- Maid's Notes (《女佣手记》), Beijing: October Literature, 2020.
