= Ma Lihua =

Chinese writer (born 1953)

Ma Lihua (Chinese: 马丽华; pinyin: Mǎ Lìhuá; born 1953), a native of Jinan, Shandong Province, is a female writer in the People's Republic of China.

== Biography ==
She obtained her degree from the Chinese Department of Linyi Teachers' College (now Linyi University) in Shandong Province in 1976 and subsequently graduated from the Writers' Class of the Chinese Department at Peking University in 1990. Subsequent to graduation, she pursued a career as a full-time writer. She held the positions of vice-chairman of the Tibetan Federation of Literature, vice-chairman of the Tibetan Writers' Association, and editor-in-chief of the China Tibetology Press.

== Scholarly works ==
She is the author of a comprehensive reportage Qinghai and Tibet: Fifty Years of Scientific Research on the Tibetan Plateau, a documentary Travels in Northern Tibet, a poetry collection My Sun. Ma Lihua received the Tibetan Everest Literary Award on two occasions, in 1992 and 2001, the Zhuang Chongwen Literary Award in 1994, the National Outstanding Bestseller Award for Walking Through Tibet in 1997, and the Fourth Lao She Literary Award in 2011 for her novel Ruyi Heights.
