= Shahbano Bilgrami =

Pakistani writer

Shahbano Bilgrami is a Pakistani writer, editor, poet, and book/film reviewer.

== Biography ==
Though born in Rawalpindi, Pakistan, Shahbano spent her early life in Montreal, Quebec, Canada. Due to her interest in literature, she was awarded a variety of prizes in essay and creative-writing contests throughout high school. In 1991, she and her family moved back to her country of origin, where she completed her A Levels. Shahbano then went on to the University of London to complete a BA Honours in English and an MA in Twentieth Century Literature from King's College London.

In 2024, she lived in New York with her husband and three daughters.

== Career ==
During her eight years at the Karachi branch of the Oxford University Press, she was an editor and writer for the Education Division. While working there, she wrote and contributed to many textbooks aimed at children.

In 1997, her poetry was published in An Anthology, by the Oxford University Press; it is a collection of poetry written by poets of Pakistani origin.

Without Dreams, Shahbano's first full-length novel, was placed on the longlist for the Man Asian Literary Prize 2007. Her second novel, Those Children, was published in 2017. It was longlisted for the DSC Prize for South Asian Fiction.

Bilgrami also published the Munna Man & Baby Lady series of children's books. She is also the writer of several English Language reading books for children who are learning English as a second language.

== Awards and honours ==
- 2007, longlisted, Man Asian Literary Prize
