= How Long Is Forever? =

1999 novella by Tie Ning

- cover of the 2014 Thai translation by the Thai princess Sirindhorn
- Author: Tie Ning
- Translator: Lian Wangshu (2008); Qiu Maoru (2010); Vivian H. Zhang (2012)
- Language: Chinese
- Set in: 1970s–1990s Beijing
- Published: Shiyue, January 1999
- Publication place: China

Chinese name
- Traditional Chinese: 永遠有多遠
- Simplified Chinese: 永远有多远
Transcriptions
Standard Mandarin
- Hanyu Pinyin: Yǒngyuǎn Yǒu Duō Yuǎn

How Long Is Forever?, also translated as How Far Is Forever? and How Long Will Eternity Last?, is a 1999 Chinese novella by Tie Ning. Set in Beijing, the novella follows a sincere and altruistic-to-a-fault girl named Bai Daxing who never changes: forever like a meek child, she always gives in to others' demands even as she gets used and dumped over and over again. Through the static Bai Daxing, Tie Ning also explores the changing values in Beijing from the 1970s Cultural Revolution to the 1990s as China experiences rapid economic growth and urbanization.

== English translations ==
- Tie Ning (2008) [1999]. "How Far Is Forever?". How Far Is Forever and More Stories by Women Writers. Foreign Languages Press. ISBN 978-7-119-05436-0. (translated by Lian Wangshu)
- Tie Ning (2010) [1999]. "How Long Is Forever?". How Long Is Forever? Two Novellas. Reader's Digest Association. ISBN 978-1-606-52152-6. (translated by Qiu Maoru)
- Tie Ning (2012) [1999]. "How Long Will Eternity Last?". The Life Show and Other Stories. Long River Press. ISBN 978-1-59265-031-6. (translated by Vivian H. Zhang)

The novella has also been translated to other languages, such as Thai (as ตลอดกาลน่ะนานแค่ไหน, by Sirindhorn) and Turkish (as Sonsuz Ne Kadar Uzun?, by Nuri Razi).

== Awards ==
- 1st Lao She Literary Award, 2000
- 2nd Lu Xun Literary Prize, 2000

== Adaptation ==
How Long Is Forever? has been adapted into a 2001 Chinese TV drama series directed by Chen Weiming, starring Xu Fan as Bai Daxing.
