= Sriram Karri =

Indian writer (born 1973)

Sriram Karri (born 1973) is an English-language novelist, writer and columnist. His novel, The Autobiography of a Mad Nation, was longlisted for the Man Asian Literary Prize in 2009. His first book, The Spiritual Supermarket, was published by Mosaic Books for the Indian sub-continent in 2007. It was longlisted for the Vodafone Crossword Book Award, (Non-Fiction), in 2008.

== Early life and education ==
Sriram Karri was born in October 1973 in Bilaspur, Madhya Pradesh (now part of Chhattisgarh).

He did his schooling from the South Eastern Railway (English Medium) School at Bilaspur. when a national scholarship conducted by the Ministry of Human Resources Development took him to Daly College as a Government Scholar. He was selected for the National Defence Academy (88th course, 5th rank in UPSC topper's list for Air Force). He could not join the National Defence Academy owing to a medical problem. He completed his graduation in arts from the BVK Degree College in Visakhapatnam, Andhra Pradesh, in History, Economic and Political Sciences. He was a member of Young Orators Club, Secunderabad.

== Career ==
Starting his career as a journalist, he worked with The Indian Express, the Business Publication Division of the Indian Express Group and The Deccan Chronicle. He has been a columnist for The Hindu' and wrote a fortnightly column, Sedition and Perdition, for The New Indian Express. He has contributed to the Comment is Free section of The Guardian and currently writes for the India Ink blogs at The New York Times.

As a full-time journalist, he wrote on Information Technology, Software, Web, IT Education and on other subjects including civic matters, public interest, social trends, political analysis, city life, education and careers, satire, and reviewed books and movies.

After he quit full-time journalism, he moved to a corporate career and handled communications, strategy, and branding of IT corporations including Infosys, Tata Consultancy Services, Magnaquest Technologies and Satyam Computer Services. He was part of the communications team of the Indian School of Business, where, as an associate editor, he brought out the school's magazine, Insight.

== Published books ==
- The Spiritual Supermarket (Mosaic Books, 2007)
- Autobiography of a Mad Nation (Fingerprint! Publishing, 2014)

== Awards ==
- 2007: (not won) longlist for the Vodafone Crossword Book Award (Non-Fiction category), The Spiritual Supermarket
- 2009: (not won) longlist for the Man Asian Literary Prize (Fiction category), Autobiography of a Mad Nation
