= Soledad's Sister =

2007 novel by Jose Dalisay

Soledad's Sister is the second novel of Filipino author Jose Dalisay (the first being Killing Time in A Warm Place, 1992). It won recognition as one of five novels shortlisted in the first The Man Asian Literary Prize in 2007.

== Summary ==
The novel starts in a cloudy August night when a casket bearing the corpse of one who is identified as Aurora V. Cabahug arrives in Ninoy Aquino International Airport from Jeddah. Mysteriously identified by Jeddah authorities as having died from drowning, she is one of 700 Filipino overseas workers who return as corpses to NAIA every year. The corpse, however, is not the real Aurora Cabahug but of her older sister, Soledad. The real Aurora Cabahug, called Rory, has in fact never set foot beyond the small town of Paez and is a singer in the Flame Tree, a KTV nightclub frequented by cops, the town’s vice-mayor and Koreans. Rory learns of her sister's death and she claims the body with the help of a local police officer, Walter G. Zamora. Along the way, their vehicle along with the casket is stolen by notorious carnapper known as Boy Alambre. In the end, Soledad's casket, is discovered by Boy Alambre. He pushes the casket into a murky river, but in an ironic twist of fate, the thief is taken along and drowns with the corpse. Soledad remains as faceless as she was when she came home.

In a series of flashbacks and narrations, we learn of the stories in each of the main characters’ lives. Their mysteries are not fully unraveled however, left to the past or to events that have yet to be told.

== Characters ==
- Soledad V. Cabahug – Soli. She first works in Hong Kong, and comes back pregnant. The second time she borrows her sister's identity, worked in Jeddah and comes back dead.
- Aurora V. Cabahug – Rory. Soli's younger sister who dreams of becoming a famous singer. She works at a KTV nightclub called the Flame Tree
- SPO2 Walter G. Zamora – Walter. A Paez police officer who helps Rory claim her sister's body
- Jose Maria Pulumbarit – Jomar, more notoriously known as Boy Alambre for his carnapping skills. He steals the FX used to transport Soli's body and unknowingly steals Soli's corpse along with it.
- Tennyson Yip – Tenny. The Vice Mayor of Paez who frequents the Flame Tree. He is Rory's customer and helps her find means to claim her sister's body.
- Mama Merry – the owner of the Flame Tree
- Chester and Nancy Lau – Soli's employers in Hong Kong
- Hedison Lau – the son of Soli's employers in Hong Kong and the father of Soli's only son
- Nai Nai – Chester Lau's mother
- Meenakshi – an Indian maid who becomes Soli's companion in Jeddah. She disappears with Soli, but her body is never found.
- Loulwa – Arabian princess and Soli's employer in Jeddah
- Fouad and Amina – Loulwa and Khaled's children
- Prince Khaled – A structural engineer and Loulwa's husband
- Yusuf – Khaled's manservant
- Nathan – Soli's illegitimate son from a teenage boy
- Francine – another singer in the Flame Tree
- Nicomedes Panganiban – Nick. A pianist from Cafe Sonata who gives Rory informal music lessons
- Mrs. Cabahug – Rory and Soli's mother. She favors Rory over her elder sister and dies in a fire along with her husband and her son Ditoy
- Mr. Cabahug – Rory and Soli's father
- Al Viduya – A NAIA security guard
- Ditoy – Rory and Soli's brother
- Noemi – A young girl involved in a case handled by Walter. She becomes Walter's lover and the cause of his separation from his wife
- Bessie – Walter's wife
- Paolo – Walter's son
- Cosme – Jomar's dead brother who appears in Jomar's fantasy as a ghost along with their father.

== Social Significance ==
The novel is situated precisely in a time which Filipinos and those who have experienced emigration, whether personal or through the exodus of their family members, can relate to. It shows the abuses suffered by Filipino migrant workers in foreign countries, and the abuses that they are again subjected to in their home country.

== Sources ==
- Dalisay, Jose. Soledad's Sister. Pasig: Anvil Publishing, 2008.
- Lacuesta, Sarge. "Soledad's Sister, brilliant new novel by Jose Y. Dalisay". Philippine Daily Inquirer. 11 July 2008. .
- "Soledad's Sister by Jose Y. Dalisay." Anvil Publishing. .
- "2007 Man Asia Literary Prize – shortlist announced". 25 October 2007.
