= Ling Li (writer) =

Chinese writer and historian (1942–2018)

- 凌力
- Born: Zeng Lili (曾黎力); 13 February 1942; Yan'an, Shaanxi, China
- Died: 18 July 2018 (aged 76); Beijing
- Education: Xidian University
- Occupation: Novelist
- Writing career
- Language: Chinese
- Period: 1978–2018
- Genre: Novel
- Subject: Historical novel
- Notable works: Young Emperor; Guan River of Broken Dreams
- Notable awards: 3rd Mao Dun Literary Prize; 1987 Young Emperor; 1st Lao She Literary Award; 1999 Guan River of Broken Dreams; Yao Xueyin Historical Novel Prize; 1999 Guan River of Broken Dreams

Zeng Lili (曾黎力; 13 February 1942 – 18 July 2018), better known by her pen name Ling Li (Chinese: 凌力; pinyin: Líng Lì), was a Chinese writer and historian. She was born in Yan'an. Her ancestral home is Yudu County, Jiangxi Province. She graduated from PLA's Xi'an Institute of Telecommunication Engineering (now Xidian University). Having worked as a missile engineer for 12 years, she transferred to the institute of Qing Dynasty History at Renmin University and became a scholar. She was the vice chairman of the Beijing Writers Association, and a member of Chinese Writers Association's 6th committee. She was awarded the Lao She Literary Award in 2000.

== Awards and honours ==
- 1991, Mao Dun Prize

== Works ==
- Young Emperor (少年天子)
- Guan River of Broken Dreams (梦断关河)
- 暮鼓晨钟
- 星星草
- 倾城倾国
