= Jose Dalisay Jr. =

Filipino writer (born 1954)

Jose Yap Dalisay Jr.
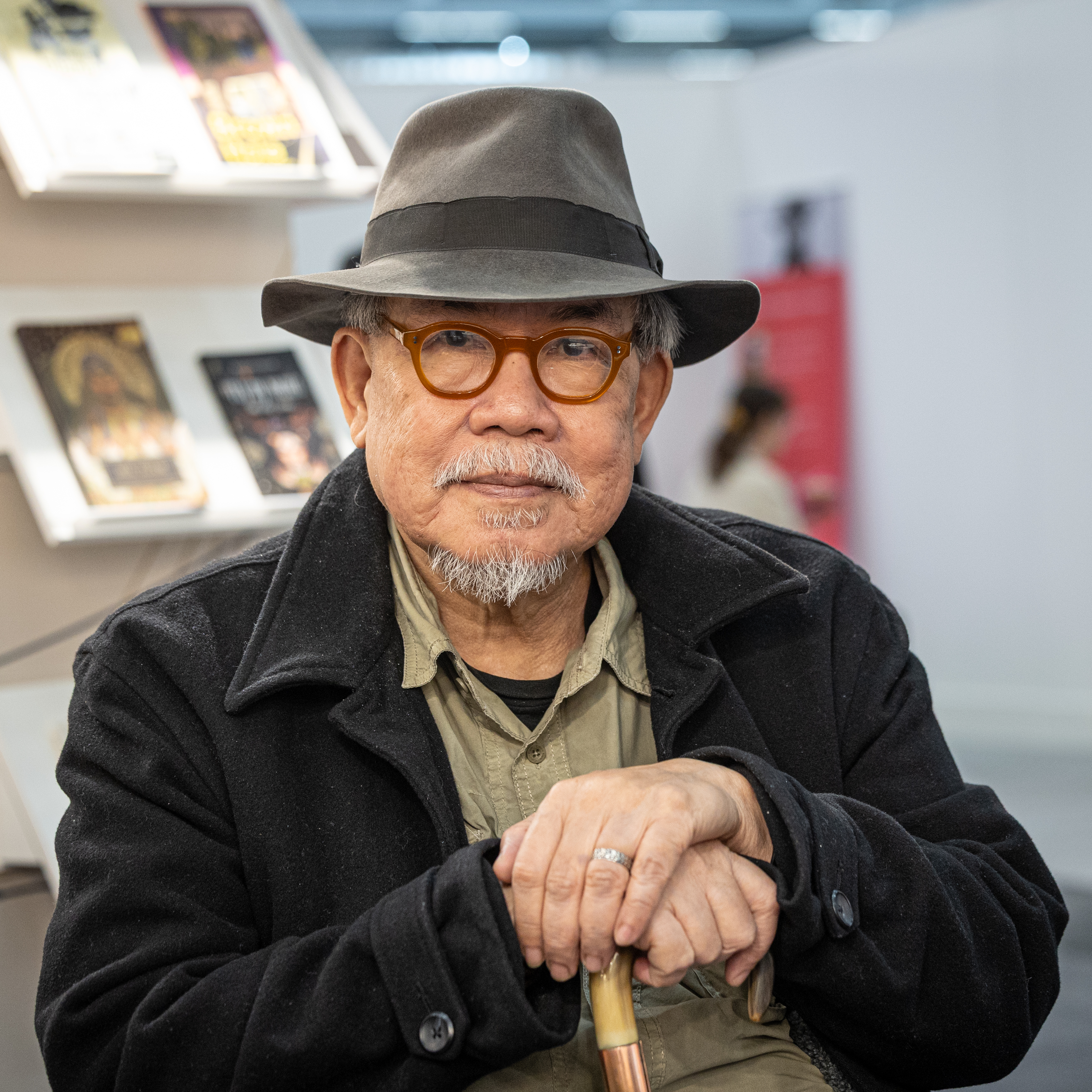
- Dalisay at the Frankfurt Book Fair 2024
- Born: January 15, 1954 (age 72); Romblon, Philippines
- Education: University of the Philippines; University of Michigan (M.F.A.); University of Wisconsin-Milwaukee (PhD)
- Occupation: Writer
- Writing career
- Pen name: Butch Dalisay
- Genres: Fiction, poetry, drama, nonfiction, and screenwriting
- Website: penmanila.ph

Jose Y. Dalisay Jr. (born January 15, 1954) is a Filipino writer. He has won numerous awards and prizes for fiction, poetry, drama, non-fiction, and screenwriting, including 16 Palanca Awards.

== Early life and education ==
Dalisay was born in Romblon in 1954. He completed his primary education at La Salle Green Hills, Philippines, in 1966 and his secondary education at the Philippine Science High School in 1970. For college, he went to the University of the Philippines, wherein he was a member of the UP Alpha Sigma. He dropped out of college to work as a newspaper reporter. He also wrote scripts mostly for Lino Brocka, the National Artist of the Philippines for Theater and Film. Dalisay returned to school and earned his B.A. English (Imaginative Writing) degree, cum laude from the University of the Philippines in 1984. He later received an M.F.A. from the University of Michigan in 1988 and a PhD in English from the University of Wisconsin–Milwaukee in 1991 as a Fulbright scholar.

== Literary career ==
Dalisay has authored more than 30 books since 1984. Six of those books have garnered National Book Awards from the Manila Critics Circle. In 1998, Dalisay made it to the Cultural Center of the Philippines (CCP) Centennial Honors List as one of the 100 most accomplished Filipino artists of the past century. Among his numerous books are Oldtimer and Other Stories (Asphodel, 1984; U.P. Press, 2003); Sarcophagus and Other Stories (U.P. Press, 1992); Killing Time in a Warm Place (Anvil, 1992); Madilim ang Gabi sa Laot at Iba Pang mga Dula ng Ligaw na Pag-Ibig (U.P. Press, 1993); Penmanship and Other Stories (Cacho, 1995); The Island (Ayala Foundation, 1996); Pagsabog ng Liwanag/Aninag, Anino (U.P. Press, 1996); Mac Malicsi, TNT/Ang Butihing Babae ng Timog (U.P. Press, 1997); The Lavas: A Filipino Family (Anvil, 1999); The Best of Barfly (Anvil, 1997); The Filipino Flag (Inquirer Publications, 2004); Man Overboard (Milflores, 2005); Journeys with Light: The Vision of Jaime Zobel (Ayala Foundation, 2005); Selected Stories (U.P. Press, 2005); and "The Knowing Is in the Writing: Notes on the Practice of Fiction" (U.P. Press, 2006).

In 2026, Dalisay ignited a Philippine literary controversy when he defended his writer friend Alfred Yuson, who was mired in informal sexual misconduct accusations, by saying: "Looking at the books in my library, I wonder how many of them I would need to throw away if they were authored by people who, sometime or other, were accused of moral turpitude, political incorrectness, sexual misconduct, poor parenting, drunkenness, drug use, slovenliness, animal cruelty, greed, arrogance, general insufferability, or some such debility of spirit and behavior. I'll bet half these books would vanish in an instant. And then I would wonder if those left behind were as interesting as the ones now in the garbage."

== Editor ==
Dalisay has also worked extensively as a professional editor. He served as Executive Editor of the ten-volume Kasaysayan: The Story of the Filipino People (Manila: Asia Publishing/Reader's Digest Asia , 1998). His clients have included the Asian Development Bank, the Ayala Foundation, SGV & Co., the National Economic and Development Authority, the Office of the (Philippine) President, the Department of Environment and Natural Resources, Philippine Airlines, and the Ramon Magsaysay Awards Foundation, among others.

== Achievements ==
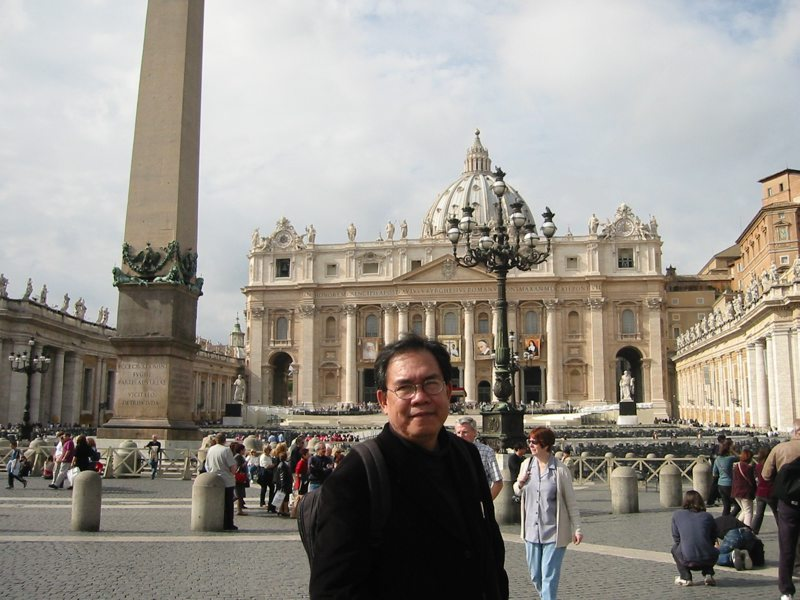
The writer at the Vatican.

Dalisay has won 16 Palanca Awards in five genres. For winning at least five First Prize awards, he was elevated to the Palanca Hall of Fame in 2000. He has also garnered five Cultural Center of the Philippines awards for playwriting; and FAMAS, URIAN, Star, and Catholic Mass Media awards and citations for his screenplays. He also chaired the 1992 ASEAN Writers Conference/Workshop, in Penang, Malaysia. He was named one of The Ten Outstanding Young Men (TOYM) of 1993 for his creative writing. In 2005, he received the"Premio Cervara di Rom" in Italy for his extensive promotion of Philippine literature overseas. In 2007, his second novel, Soledad's Sister, was shortlisted for the inaugural Man Asian Literary Prize in Hong Kong.

He has received Hawthornden Castle, British Council, David T.K. Wong, Rockefeller (Bellagio), and Civitella Ranieri fellowships, and has held the Henry Lee Irwin Professorial Chair at the Ateneo de Manila University; and the Jose Joya, Jorge Bocobo, and Elpidio Quirino professorial chairs at U.P. Diliman. He has lectured on Philippine culture and politics at the University of Michigan, University of Auckland, Australian National University, Universiti Kebangsaan Malaysia, St. Norbert College (Wisconsin, U.S.), University of East Anglia, University of Rome, London School of Economics, and the University of California, San Diego, where he was named Pacific Leadership Fellow in 2015..

After serving for three years as Chair of the English and Comparative Literature Department, Dalisay assumed the post of Vice President for Public Affairs of the U.P. System from May 2003 to February 2005. He returned to the post in February 2017 and retired in January 2019. He is currently a Professor Emeritus of English and creative writing at the College of Arts and Letters, U.P. Diliman, where he also coordinated the creative writing program. He was Director of the U.P. Institute of Creative Writing from 2008 to 2017. Aside from his weekly Arts & Culture column for the Philippine Star, he wrote political and social commentary for the newsmagazine Newsbreak and the San Francisco-based Filipinas magazine.

In 2017, the One UP-Jose Yap Dalisay Jr. Professorial Chair in Creative Writing was endowed in his honor by an anonymous donor at the University of the Philippines.

== Notable works ==
=== Novels ===
- Killing Time in a Warm Place, 1992
- Soledad's Sister, 2008
- "Soledad: Rocambolesco Romanzo Filippino" (Italian edition), 2009
- "In Flight: Two Novels of the Philippines" (a combined US edition), 2011
- La Soeur de Soledad, (French edition), 2013

=== Plays ===
- Madilim ang Gabi sa Laot at Iba Pang Mga Dula ng Ligaw na Pag-Ibig, 1993
- Pagsabog ng Liwanag/Aninag, Anino, 1996
- Ang Butihing Babae ng Timog/Mac Malicsi, TNT, 1997

=== Screenplays ===
More than twenty produced screenplays, including

- Miguelito, 1985
- Ang Ika-Labing Isang Utos: Mahalin Mo Asawa Mo, 1994
- Tayong Dalawa, 1994
- Saranggola, 1999

=== Fiction ===
- "Oldtimer and Other Stories" (Quezon City: Asphodel Books, 1984)
- "Sarcophagus and Other Stories" (Quezon City: University of the Philippines Press, 1992)
- "Killing Time in a Warm Place" (Pasig: Anvil Publishing, 1992)
- "Penmanship and Other Stories" (Pasig: Cacho Publishing, 1995)
- "The Island" (Makati: Ayala Foundation, 1996). With Jaime Zobel and Francisco Doplon.
- "Selected Stories" (QC: UP Press, 2005)
- "Soledad's Sister" (Pasig: Anvil Publishing, 2008)
- "Soledad: Rocambolesco Romanzo Filippino" (Milano: Isbn Edizioni, 2009). Translated by Clara Nubile.
- "In Flight: Two Novels of the Philippines" (Tucson: Schaffner Press, 2011)
- "Pasando el rato en un pais calido" (Barcelona: Libros del Asteroide, 2012). Translated by Marta Alcaraz.
- "La soeur de Soledad" (Paris: Mercure de France, 2013). Translated by Jean-Pierre Aoustin.
- "Voyager and Other Fictions: The Collected Stories of Jose Dalisay" (Pasig: Anvil Publishing, 2019)

=== Essays ===
- "The Best of Barfly" (Pasig: Anvil Publishing, 1997)
- "Man Overboard" (QC: Milflores, 2005)
- "The Knowing Is in the Writing: Notes on the Practice of Fiction" (QC: UP Press, 2006)
- "Why Words Matter" (QC:Center for Art, New Ventures & Sustainable Development, 2019). With illustrations by Marcel Antonio.
- "A Richness of Embarrassments and Other Easy Essays" (Quezon City: UP Press, 2020)

=== Nonfiction ===
- "The Lavas: A Filipino Family" (Pasig: Anvil Publishing, 1999)
- "Bandera: The Filipino Flag" (Makati: Inquirer Publications, 2004)
- "Journeys with Light: The Vision of Jaime Zobel" (Makati: Ayala Foundation, 2005)
- "Power from the Deep: The Malampaya Story" (Makati: Shell Philippines, 2005)
- "Unleashing the Power of Steam: The PNOC-EDC Story" (Makati: PNOC-EDC, 2006)
- "Portraits of a Tangled Relationship: The Philippines and the United States" (Manila: Ars Mundi Philippinae, 2008). With Jose Ma. Cariño and others.
- "Wash: Only a Bookkeeper" (Makati: SGV Foundation, 2009)
- "The Voices of the Mountain: The People of Mt. Apo Speak" (Makati: EDC, 2009)
- "Decade of Reform, Decade of Innovation: The GSIS Under PGM Winston Garcia, 2001-2010" (Manila: GSIS, 2010)
- "Builder of Bridges: The Rudy Cuenca Story" (Pasig: Anvil Publishing, 2010). With Antonette Reyes.
- "With Hearts Aflame: The Christian Brothers in the Philippines, 1911-2011" (Mandaluyong: DLSP, 2012)
- "A Man Called Tet" (Pasig: Anvil Publishing, 2015)
- "Edgardo J. Angara: In the Grand Manner" (Quezon City: UP Press, 2015)
- "Harvest of Heroes" (Manila: Land Bank of the Philippines, 2015)
- "Lighting the Second Century, with Exie Abola and Felice Sta. Maria" (Pasig: Meralco, 2015)
- "Lessons from Nationalist Struggle: The Life of Emmanuel Q. Yap), with Josef T. Yap" (Pasig: Anvil Publishing, 2016
- "The Shell Century: Powering Philippine Progress" (Makati: Pilipinas Shell, 2016)
- "Andrew and Mercedes Gotianun: Useless Each Without the Other" (Quezon City; ABS-CBN Publishing, 2018). With Jonathan Gotianun, Josephine Gotianun Yap, and Charlson Ong.
- "Transforming Horizons: The PRSB Story" (Pasig: Philippine Resources Savings Bank, 2019). With Vanessa D. Gregorio.
- "A Millennial Man for Others: The Life and Times of Rafael M. Salas, with Carmen Sarmiento" (Mandaluyong: Commission on Population, 2019)

=== Drama ===
- "Madilim ang Gabi sa Laot at Iba Pang mga Dula ng Ligaw na Pag-Ibig" (Quezon City: UP Press, 1993)
- "Pagsabog ng Liwanag / Aninag, Anino" (QC: UP Press, 1996)
- "Ang Butihing Babae ng Timog / Mac Malicsi, TNT" (QC: UP Press, 1997)

=== Poetry ===
- "Pinoy Septych and Other Poems" (Manila: UST Publishing, 2011)

=== Books edited ===
- "Kasaysayan: The Story of the Filipino People, 10 volumes" (Manila: Asia Publishing, 1998). Written by various authors.
- "The Likhaan Book of Poetry and Fiction" (Quezon City: UP Press, 1999). With Ricardo de Ungria, written by various authors.
- "From Earth to Sky: The Life and Times of Hans Menzi" (Manila: Menzi Trust Fund, 2001). Written by Alya Honasan.
- "A Promise to Keep: From Athens to Afghanistan" (Xlibris, 2003). Written by Arthur and Julie Hill.
- "Remembering NVM" (Quezon City: University of the Philippines Press, 2004). Written by various authors.
- "Fourteen Love Stories, with Angelo R. La Cuesta" (Quezon City: University of the Philippines Press, 2004).
- "The Silk Road Revisited: Markets, Merchants, and Minarets" (Bloomington: Author House, 2006). Written by Julie Hill.
- "Likhaan: The Journal of Contemporary Philippine Literature" (Quezon City: University of the Philippines Press, 2007). Written by various authors.
- "Hidden Treasures, Simple Pleasures" (Makati: Bookhaven, 2009). Written by Jaime C. 9. Laya, Mariano C. Lao, and Edilberto B. Bravo.
- "Shadow of Doubt: Probing the Supreme Court" (Quezon City: Public Trust Media Group, 2010). Written by Marites Danguilan Vitug.
- "Our Rights, Our Victories: Landmark Cases in the Supreme Court" (Quezon City: Cleverheads Publishing, 2011). Written by Marites Danguilan Vitug and Criselda Yabes.
- "Endless Journey: A Memoir" (Quezon City: Cleverheads Publishing, 2011). Written by Jose T. Almonte with Marites Danguilan Vitug.
- "The Future Begins Here" (Manila: De La Salle University, 2011). Written by various authors.
- "Privileged Witness: Journeys of Rediscovery" (Bloomington: Author House, 2014). Written by Julie Hill.
- "In the Afternoon Sun: My Alexandria" (Makati: Society for Cultural Enrichment, 2017). Written by Julie Hill.
- "Stories from the Heart" (Manila: Philippine Airlines, 2017). Written by various authors.
- "Joey: A Tribute to Joey Concepcion" (Makati: Studio 5, 2017)
- "Rock Solid: How the Philippines Won Its Case Against China" (Quezon City: Ateneo de Manila University Press, 2018). Written by Marites Danguilan Vitug.
- "Gold on the Horizon: Transforming Oriental Mindoro" (Makati: Studio 5, 2018). Written by various authors.
- "Budget Reform in the Philippines" (Pasig: Anvil Publishing, 2019). Written by Ronald Mendoza and David Timberman.
- "The Story of Philippine Central Banking: Stability and Strength at Seventy" (Makati: Studio 5, 2019). Written by various authors.
- "An Appointment with the Vatican: A Biography of Bienvenido R. Tantoco Sr." (Quezon City: Creative Programs, Inc., 2019). Written by Rodolfo G. Silvestre.
- "The Essential Manuel Arguilla Reader" (Pasig: Anvil Publishing, 2019). Written by Manuel Arguilla.

== Honors and awards ==
- Civitella Ranieri Fellowship
- David T.K. Wong Fellowship for Creative Writing, University of East Anglia
- Chamberlain Award
- Milwaukee Fiction Award
- American Poets Prize
- Fulbright- Hays Scholarship
- Hawthornden Castle Fellowship, Scotland
- British Council Fellow to Cambridge
- Word Festival (Australia)
- Asia 2000 (New Zealand)
- Centennial Honors for the Arts, Cultural Center of the Philippines
- Ten Outstanding Young Men (TOYM) of the Philippines
- Cultural Center of the Philippines Awards for Literature
- National Book Awards from the Manila Critics Circle
- FAMAS Award for Best Screenplay
- Catholic Mass Media Award for Best Screenplay
- URIAN citation for Best Screenplay
- Star Awards citation for Best Screenplay
- Palanca Awards for Literature
- Palanca Hall of Fame Winner
- Man Asian Literary Prize 2007 Shortlistee for Soledad's Sister
- 7th Department of Tourism Kalakbay Award for Best Travel Writer
- Fellow, Standard Chartered International Literary Festival, Hong Kong
- Philippine Graphic Awards
- U.P. President's Award for Outstanding Publications
- Writing fellow, 20th Dumaguete National Writers' Workshop (1981)
- Henry Lee Irwin Professorial Chair, Ateneo de Manila University
- Jose Joya, Jorge Bocobo, and Elpidio Quirino Professorial Chairs at the U.P. Diliman
- Rockefeller Fellowship in Bellagio, Italy
- Premio Cervara di Roma, Italy
- Has lectured at the University of Michigan, University of Auckland, Australian National University, Universiti Kebangsaan Malaysia, St. Norbert College, University of East Anglia, University of Rome, and the London School of Economics and the University of California, San Diego

== See also ==
- Wilfrido Ma. Guerrero
- Severino Montano
- Rene Villanueva
