= The Bathing Women =

2000 novel by Tie Ning

- Author: Tie Ning
- Original title: Chinese: 大浴女; pinyin: Dà yù nǚ; lit. 'Big-Bath Woman'
- Translators: Hongling Zhang; Jason Sommer
- Language: Chinese
- Genre: Semi-autobiographical, historical novel, bildungsroman
- Publisher: Charles Scribner's Sons
- Publication date: 2000
- Publication place: China
- English publication date: 2012
- Media type: Print (hardback & paperback)
- Pages: 368 pp.
- ISBN: 1476704252

The Bathing Women is a novel written by Chinese author Tie Ning and published in Chinese in 2000, translated into English in 2012. The Bathing Women focuses on the lives and personal growth of several characters as they live in the turbulent times of the Cultural Revolution and the economic boom of the 1980s. The plot focuses on several feminist themes such as gender inequality, misogyny and sexual liberality.

== Plot summary ==
The Bathing Women focuses on the main character Tiao, a Beijing publisher who on chance begins an affair with the older married actor Feng Jing, her sister Fan and her long term friend Fei, as they grow up in the chaos of the Cultural Revolution. The novel is set simultaneously in the 1960s and 1980s China. The work addresses issues like sexism, gender roles, and Chinese cultural double standards.

The novel opens with the protagonist Tiao, a successful executive for a Beijing publishing company, entering into an affair with the married actor Feng Jing. Feng Jing is internationally acclaimed for his portrayal of the hardships of the victims of the Cultural Revolution based on his own experiences in a labor camp at the time. Throughout their relationship Feng Jing promises Tiao that he will leave his wife to marry her.

The setting of the novel flashes back to a moment in Tiao's youth, in which she witnesses the public denouncement of one of her school's teachers, Tang Jingjing. Ms. Tang had recently had a daughter out of wedlock and is labelled as a "female hooligan". As punishment for her transgression she is given a choice: either reveal the name of the father of her daughter or be forced to consume feces, Ms. Tang not wanting to humiliate her daughter, chooses the latter.

Chapter 2 of The Bathing Women focuses on Tiao and her sister Fan's early childhood, in particular their relationship to their father Yixun and their mother Wu. Yixun, a successful architect is denounced as a class enemy and sent to the labor camp Reed River Farm to be "reeducated through labor." During this time Wu develops an illness in which she suddenly becomes dizzy and collapses, which allows her a brief period of leave from the camp to return to her family. Wu, frightened by the idea of returning to the camp seduces her physician Doctor Tang, who reciprocates by turning in a false diagnosis to the government that Wu suffers from a chronic heart condition, thus allowing her to be spared from returning.

Despite returning to her children, Wu routinely ignores them in favor of pursuing her relationship with Dr. Tang, enraging Tiao who sees her mother as betraying her father. The tension between mother and daughter reaches a climax as Fan develops a serious illness while her mother is visiting her lover, leading to Tiao to scream at her mother, claiming that Fan's illness is entirely the fault of her mother.

Tiao befriends Dr. Tang's niece, Fei, an attractive and luxuriously dressed high school girl. Despite Tiao's animosity to Dr. Tang for having an affair with her mother, Tiao soon finds Fei to be her closest friend, often spending hours with her and Youyou, reading prohibited Soviet magazines for recipes.

During this time Wu becomes pregnant with her third daughter Quan, the pregnancy is immediately regarded with suspicion by all members of the family, who believe that Dr. Tang had fathered the child not Yiuan. Quan is routinely mistreated by both Fan and Tiao who view her as an example of their mother's infidelity. While the sisters watch Quan play in the street one day, they witness her fall into an open sewer, dying instantly. This moment would act as a strong motivator for both Fan and Tiao who feel as though they had both murdered their mistreated sister.

== Characters ==
- Tiao – Central character of the novel. Born in the city of Fu'an, Fei grows up during The Cultural Revolution. Later she is introduced as literary agent for a large Chinese book publishing company that specializes in memoirs of Chinese celebrities.
- Fan – Tiao's younger sister. As a child Fan admired her older sister, but as an adult she grew cold and selfish. Fan marries an American man named Davis and moves to America.
- Fei – Tiao's high school friend who was born in Beijing. Fei's mother conceived her out of wedlock leading to both of the women to be socially ostracized. Fei is portrayed throughout the novel as being strongly independent and unconcerned about social taboos, such as during her youth when she routinely practices casual sex despite the strong stigma associated with it. Throughout her life Fei enters into several abusive relationships.
- Youyou – Friend of Tiao's and Fei's. An amateur chef, Youyou takes pride in cooking new recipes she learns from prohibited Russian magazines. She is described as having a chubby build caused likely from her excessive consumption of her own dishes. Later in the novel she opens her own small stir fry restaurant in Beijing.
- Dr. Tang – Fei's uncle and guardian, who adopts her after the death of his sister. Tang plays a major role in the novel by entering into an affair with Tiao's mother, Wu, which results in the birth of his illegitimate daughter, Quan. Years after dissolving his relationship with Wu, Tang is caught mid-act having an illegal affair with a promiscuous nurse; instead of being captured Tang commits suicide by jumping off a coal chimney.
- Wu – Tiao's mother who enters into an affair with Dr. Tang.
- Feng Jing – Famous actor who rose to success after portraying the tragedy of the victims of the Cultural Revolution. Feng is extremely callous manipulating Tiao with a promise to marry her once he divorces his present wife.

== Reception ==
The Bathing Women generally received mixed to positive reviews from Western critics.

Julia Lovell of The Guardian wrote, "...compared with recent offerings by writers such as Mo Yan or Yu Hua, Tie Ning's command of psychological realism is practically Jamesian. Her portrait of the conceited Fang Jing is agreeably sharp. She is an acute, sympathetic observer of Chinese society, skilled at capturing the discomforts, hypocrisies and uncouthness of everyday life, and the way that guilt and grievance corrode relationships." Though Lovell also notes that she considers the book to be conforming with the historical interpretation of China as established by the Chinese Communist Party. Japanese Nobel Prize laureate Kenzaburo Oe praised the novel stating,"If I were to pick the ten best literary works in the world of the past ten years, I would definitely rank The Bathing Women among them."

In contrast, Dawn contributor Zara Khadeeja Majoka gave a far more negative review of the book stating, "On the whole, the reader is neither able to muster any great empathy for the characters nor relate to them in any significant way. The novel is cluttered with many ‘almost’ moments; moments when you almost feel something for a character or almost understand their motive but then soon enough an unnecessary tangent, a gross magnification of the obvious or a dreaded cliché rears its head and you're back to feeling frustrated."
