= 2008 Palanca Awards =

Philippine literary award

58th Palanca Awards
- Date: September 1, 2008
- Location: The Peninsula Manila, Makati City, Philippines

The 58th Don Carlos Palanca Memorial Awards for Literature was held on September 1, 2008, at The Peninsula Manila in Makati to commemorate the memory of Don Carlos Palanca Sr. through an endeavor that would promote education and culture in the country. This year’s roster of winners almost equally distributed among Palanca veterans (57%) and first-time winners (43%). Presented every three years, the “Novel” was once more part of the 20 categories in this year’s competition. Education Secretary Jesli Lapus of the Department of Education was Guest of Honor and Speaker at this year’s awarding ceremony.

The 2008 winners are divided into four categories:

== English Division ==
=== Novel ===
- Grand Prize: Miguel Syjuco, Ilustrado

=== Short Story ===
- First Prize: Ian Rosales Casocot, "Things You Don’t Know"
- Second Prize: Tara F. T. Sering, "Good People"
- Third Prize: Nadine L. Sarreal, "Night Sounds"

=== Short Story for Children ===
- First Prize: Celestine Marie G. Trinidad, "The Storyteller and the Giant"
- Second Prize: No Winner
- Third Prize: Kathleen Osias, "The Mapangarap and the Dream Trees"

=== Poetry ===
- First Prize: Francis C. Macansantos, "Morphic Variations"
- Second Prize: Anna Maria Katigbak, "Sl(e)ights"
- Third Prize: Marie La Viña, "The Gospel According to the Blind Man"

=== Essay ===
- First Prize: Jose Claudio B. Guerrero, "Talking to a Fu Dog on a Wedding Afternoon"
- Second Prize: Katrina Stuart Santiago, "Mirrors"
- Third Prize: Jhoanna Lynn Cruz, "Sapay Coma"

=== One-Act Play ===
- First Prize: Maria Clarissa N. Estuar, "Anybody’s Revolution"
- Second Prize: Percival Intalan, "Secret Identities"
- Third Prize: Joachim Emilio B. Antonio, "Newspaper Dance"

=== Full-Length Play ===
- First Prize: Peter Solis Nery, "The Passion of Jovita Fuentes"
- Second Prize: No Winner
- Third Prize: No Winner

== Filipino Division ==
=== Nobela ===
- Grand Prize: Norman Wilwayco, Gerilya

=== Maikling Kwento ===
- First Prize: Maria Lucille Roxas, "Game Show"
- Second Prize: Lemuel E. Garcellano, "Anghel Kalahig"
- Third Prize: Rommel B. Rodriguez, "Kabagyan"

=== Maikling Kwentong Pambata ===
- First Prize: No Winner
- Second Prize: April Jade B. Imson, "Si Karding at ang Buwaya"
- Third Prize: Allan Alberto N. Derain, "May Tatlong Kurimaw"

=== Tula ===
- First Prize: Mikael de Lara Co, "Ang Iba’t-ibang Ngalan ng Hangin"
- Second Prize: Renato L. Santos, "Sari-saring salaghati... (At Good-bye-My-Kangkungan) at Ibang Tula"
- Third Prize: Niles Jordan Breis, "Rubrica mga Lakbay-nilay at Pagbubunyag"

=== Sanaysay ===
- First Prize: Jing Panganiban-Mendoza, "Ang Pagbabalik ng Prinsesa ng Banyera"
- Second Prize: Eugene Y. Evasco, "Agaw-buhay"
- Third Prize: Michael M. Coroza, "Si Nanay, Si Lolo Ceferino, Ang Lira at Si Eliot, o Ang Henesis ng Aking Pananaludtod"

=== Dulaang May Isang Yugto ===
- First Prize: Floy C. Quintos, "Ang Kalungkutan ng mga Reyna"
- Second Prize: Debbie Ann Tan, "Teroristang Labandera"
- Third Prize: Allan B. Lopez, "Masaganang Ekonomiya"

=== Dulang Ganap Ang Haba ===
- First Prize: No Winner
- Second Prize: No Winner
- Third Prize: No Winner

=== Dulang Pampelikula ===
- First Prize: Michiko Yamamoto and Emmanuel Dela Cruz, "1434456: The Singalong Singhs"
- Second Prize: Dennis Marasigan, "Joy"
- Third Prize: Alfred Aloysius Adlawan, "Padyak"

== Regional Division ==
=== Short Story [Cebuano] ===
- First Prize: Macario D. Tiu, "Tsuru"
- Second Prize: Edgar S. Godin, "Bingo"
- Third Prize: Lilia Tio, "Sapatos"

=== Short Story [Hiligaynon] ===
- First Prize: Leoncio P. Deriada, "Ang Pagbalik sang Babaylan"
- Second Prize: Alice Tan Gonzales, "Dawata, Anak"
- Third Prize: Marcel Milliam, "Bitay"

=== Short Story [Iluko] ===
- First Prize: Danilo Antalan, "Dangilen"
- Second Prize: Ariel Tabag, "Littugaw"
- Third Prize: Aurelio Agcaoili, "Alegoria Uno"

== Kabataan Division ==
=== Kabataan Essay ===
- First Prize: Miro Frances Dimaano Capili, "Rated X"
- Second Prize: Cristina Gratia F. Tantengco, "Things that Lie Beyond the Postcards"
- Third Prize: Elfermin Manalansan Mallari Jr., "The Roads and Dreams that Meander"

=== Kabataan Sanaysay ===
- First Prize: No Winner
- Second Prize: No Winner
- Third Prize: Allen D. Yuarata, "Nang Dumating si Joe"
