= Sujatha Vijayaraghavan =

Indian writer, dancer, musician, musicologist and fine arts research scholar

Sujatha Vijayaraghavan is an Indian writer, dancer, musician, musicologist and fine arts research scholar. She is affiliated with Natyarangam, the dance wing of the classical arts institution Narada Gana Sabha in Chennai, Tamil Nadu, and associated with the Natya Dance Theatre, a classical Bharatanatyam company based in the city of Chicago in the United States of America. She was also associated with the pioneering Bharatanatyam dancer Kalanidhi Narayanan.

Vijayaraghavan has a senior fellowship at the Tamil Pada Varnam Project and has directed a number of documentary films on the life and works of Bharatanatyam dancers such as Andavan Pichai and Kumbakonam Bhanumathy. She has also collaborated in Bharatanatyam dance production projects with dancers such as Anitha Guha, and is noted for composing Devi Bharatam: The Mother and Liberator, a musical and poetic rendition of Vande Mataram, the national prayer song written by Bankim Chandra Chatterjee and translated to Tamil by Subramania Bharati.

== Bibliography ==
- Oru piṭi vairam [A Small Diamond] (in Tamil). Vān̲ati Patippakam. 1990.
- Araṅkam: Naval [Arena: Novel] (in Tamil). Vān̲ati Patippakam. 1993.
- Entayum Tayum [Mother of Anything] (in Tamil). Vān̲ati Patippakam. 1995.
