= Tie Ning =

Chinese writer

- Tie in Beijing, 2017
- Born: September 1957 (age 68–69); Beijing, China
- Education: Baoding 11th High School
- Occupations: Novelist, politician
- Spouse: Hua Sheng (华生)
- Relatives: Father: Tie Yang (铁扬)
- Writing career
- Language: Chinese
- Period: 1975–present
- Genres: Novels, short stories
- Notable works: Ah, Xiangxue; How Long Is Forever? Wheat Straw Stack; The Bathing Women
- Notable awards: Zhuang Zhongwen Literary Prize; 1993; Lu Xun Literary Prize; 1997; Lao She Literary Award; 2002; Bing Xin Prose Award; 2002 2005

Chinese name
- Traditional Chinese: 鐵凝
- Simplified Chinese: 铁凝
Transcriptions
Standard Mandarin
- Hanyu Pinyin: Tiě Níng

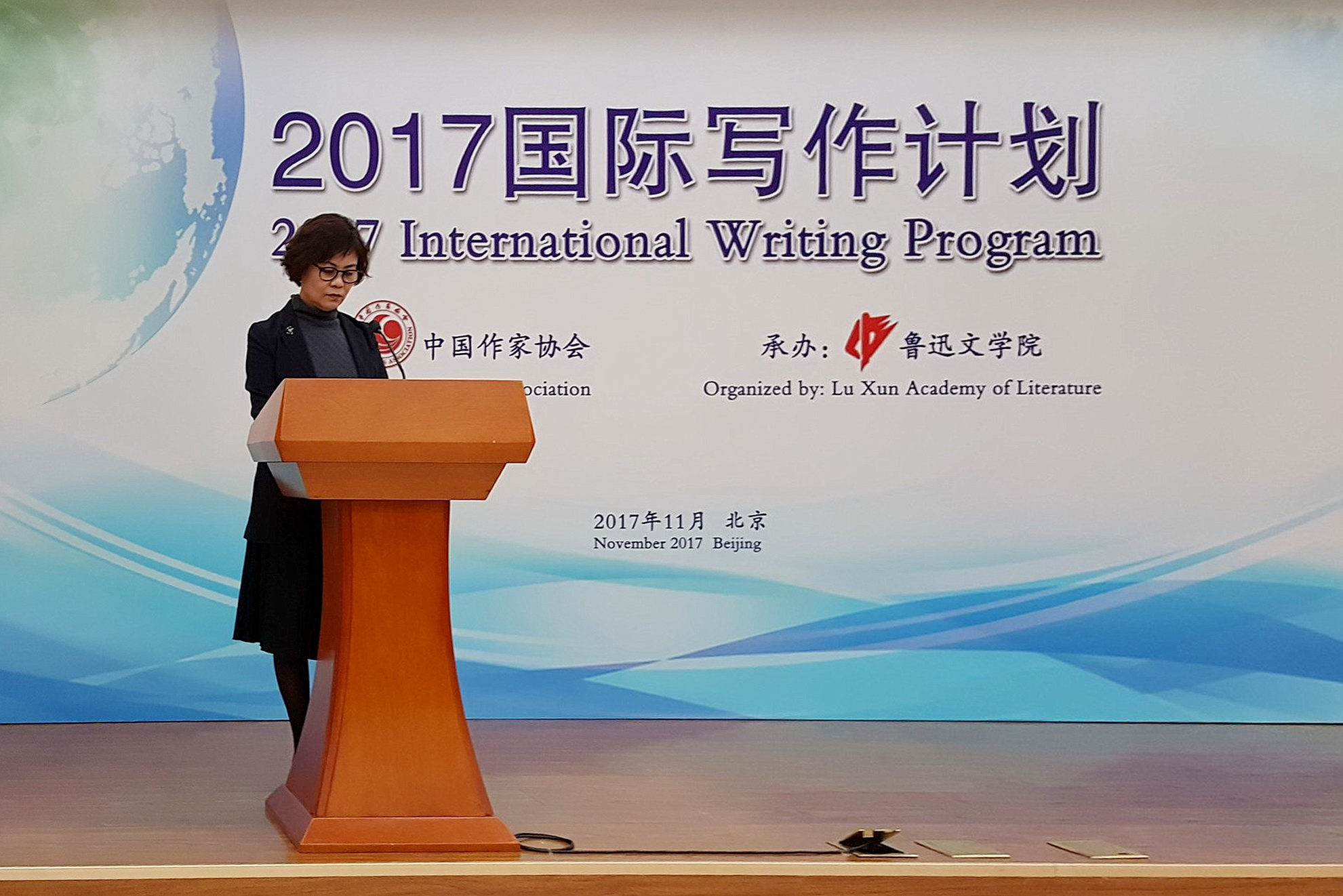
Tie Ning during opening ceremony of The 1-st International Writing Program in Beijing (2017)

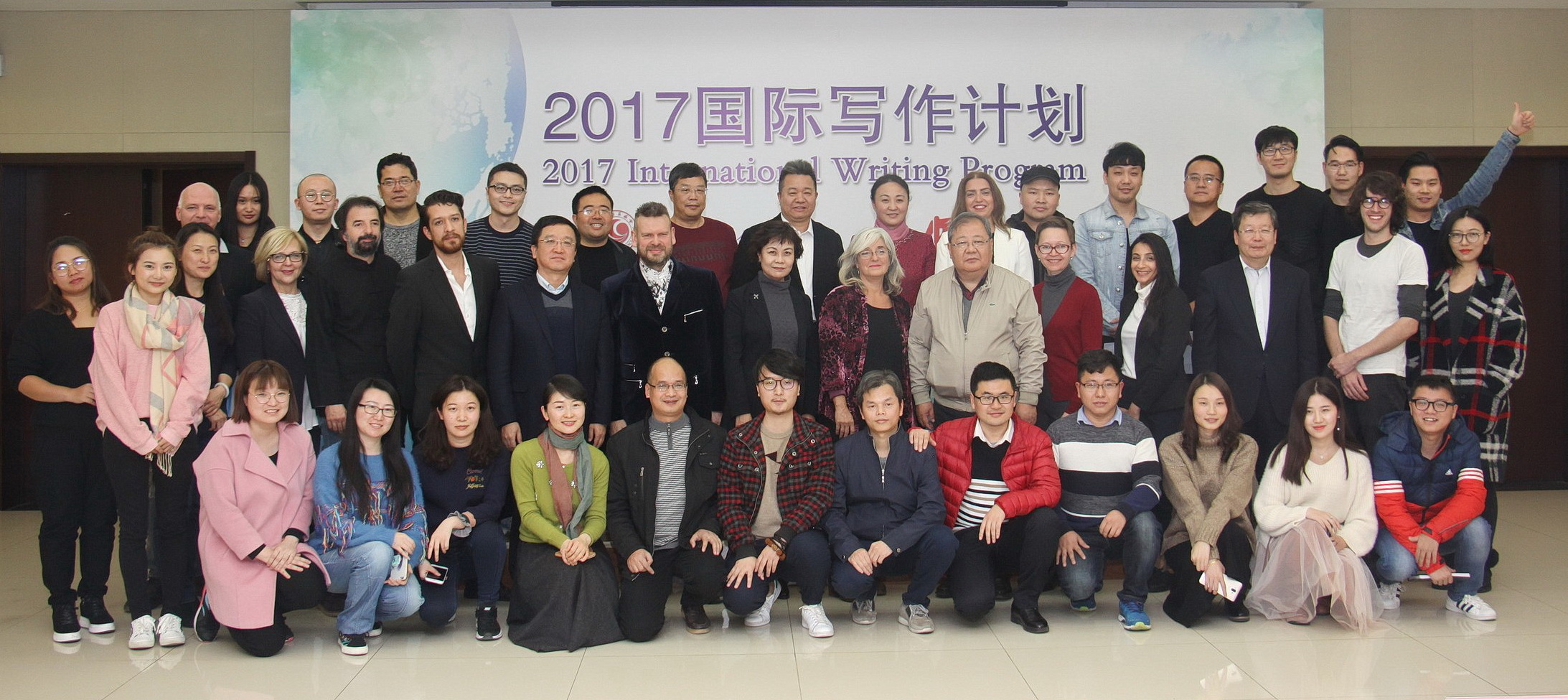
Tie Ning, Jidi Majia, Nurduran Duman, J.Pijarowski and many more of international and Chinese guests during opening ceremony of The 1-st International Writing Program in Beijing (2017)

Tie Ning (born September 1957) is a Chinese author based in Beijing, China. She served as president of the China Writers Association from 2006 to 2025 and is a member of the 18th Central Committee of the Chinese Communist Party. Her works include short stories, "Ah, Xiangxue" (Chinese: 哦，香雪), The Red Shirt Without Buttons (Chinese: 沒有紐扣的紅襯衫), "June's Big Topic" (Chinese: 六月的話題), Wheat Straw Stack (Chinese: 麥秸垛), Cotton Stack (Chinese: 棉花垛), "The Village Road Takes Me Home", Rose Door (Chinese: 玫瑰門), "How Long is Forever" (Chinese: 永遠有多遠) and Da Yu Nü (Chinese: 大浴女) (Big-Bath Woman).

On 10 March 2023, Tie was elected as Vice Chairwoman of the Standing Committee of the 14th National People's Congress.

== Background ==
Tie Ning traces her ancestry to Hebei province. In 1975, after graduation from high school in Baoding, Tie Ning went to Hebei Province to experience rural life. In 1979, she returned to Baoding and worked in the Baoding Branch of the Chinese Federation of Art and Literature as novel editor. In 1984, she worked in the Creative Writing Workshop of Hebei. Now she is the chairperson of the Writers Association of China, a position no woman had ever held before. On 4 December 2016 Tie Ning was subsequently elected as chairwoman of the China Federation of Literary and Art Circles, replacing Sun Jiazheng, in addition to being reelected as chairperson of the Writers Association of China.

On 10 March 2023, during the 14th National People's Congress, she was appointed Vice Chairman of the Standing Committee of the National People's Congress.

== Awards and honors ==
Tie Ning started publishing her works in 1975. In 1982, her short story "Ah, Xiangxue" (Chinese: 哦，香雪) won a national award. In 1984, her medium-length novel The Red Shirt Without Buttons (Chinese: 沒有紐扣的紅襯衫) and her short story "June's Big Topic" (Chinese: 六月的話題) won national awards. Since 1980, Tie Ning has published Path in the Night and other collections of short stories and novellas. Her Wheat Straw Stack (Chinese: 麥秸垛) won an award as the 1986/1987 "Middle-length Novel Offprint" (Chinese: 中篇小說選刊). She won the Lao She Literary Award in 2000 and 2002. In 2015, Tie Ning was made the Ordre des Arts et des Lettres.

== Style ==
Her early works mainly depicted ordinary people and daily life, exquisitely portraying her characters' inner worlds, and reflecting people's dreams and pursuits and the absurdity and suffering in their lives.

In 1986 and 1988, she published two novels, Wheat Straw Stack (Chinese: 麥秸垛) and Cotton Stack (Chinese: 棉花垛) respectively, both reflecting ancient history and culture and dealing with women's experiences. After 1986, her novels changed direction to reflection on traditional Chinese cultures, with polysemous themes and varied techniques. In 1988, she wrote her first full-length novel, Rose Door (Chinese: 玫瑰門), in which she departed from her harmonious and idealistic poetic style, and displayed the dark side of life through the competition for survival among women of several generations.

== Works ==
- Ah, Xiangxue (Chinese: 哦，香雪) (1982)

This is a story about an innocent country girl, Xiangxue, "fragrant snow" in Chinese. Xiangxue lives in a village in the mountains. Every day, a train from outside the mountains stops at the village just for a minute. Xiangxue and other country girls each take a small basket of eggs to the train when it stops and exchange them for things they want that they cannot get in the village. Xiangxue carries the basket onto the train, and when she sees a pencil box beside a city girl of her age, she immediately wants it. She offers her for it a full basket of eggs; the exchange is made. It opens up a door to the outside world for her. The story shows the country girl's simplicity and her yearning for civilization.

- The Village Road Takes Me Home (1983)

Tie Ning is critical of the masculine model as a basis for thought about opposition to the power of the party or state and for assuming responsibility over women's lives. This model is embodied in two male characters who both want to marry the female protagonist because they feel responsible for her earlier marriage to a peasant, which left her a widow and prevented her from returning to the city after the policy of sending educated youths to rural China ended.

In her story about the female protagonist's choice between the two, which entails the significant and ideologically loaded choice between the city and the countryside, Tie Ning reveals the complicity of the masculine model in the party's and state's dominant ideology, despite its apparent opposition to it. In its place, she offers the protagonist's feminine view, that one should determine one's life-course based on one's own needs, desires, and abilities, rather than with reference to either opposition to or compliance with the party-state and its ideology.

- How Long is Forever (Chinese: 永遠有多遠) (1999)

Bai Daxing is a typical girl brought up in Beijing's Hutongs. She is a kind girl who is always willing to offer help to everybody around her without any consideration of her own interests. But the innocent Bai is cheated repeatedly by the friends who have received her help and love. The people she trusts most make use of her purity and warm-heartedness, leaving Bai with less and less. Bai's personality does not seem to be suited to the times. Tie uses Bai to emphasize how far modern society is from perfection.

- The Bathing Women (Chinese: 大浴女; lit. 'Big-Bath Woman') (2000)

Tie Ning's semi-autobiographical novel illustrates how difficult it is for Chinese writers to ignore the national allegory. Set in the world of writing and publishing, the novel relates the story of a young woman and of two older men who are both in love with her. The narrative alternates between first- and third-person as the protagonist connects her love affair with her memories of her teenage years, showing how she achieves strength through the interweaving of her private and public lives.

== Complete works ==
- 铁凝文集 "The Works of Tie Ning" (5 volumes), Jiangsu Literature and Art Publishing House, (1996)
  - 青草垛 "The Grass Heap"，novella collection，ISBN 7-5399-0982-X
  - 埋人 "Burying", novella collection, ISBN 7-5399-0983-8
  - 六月的话题 "June Topics", short story collection, ISBN 7-5399-0984-6
  - 玫瑰门 "The Rose Door", Novel, ISBN 7-5399-0985-4
  - 女人的白夜 "A Woman’s Nights", essay collection, ISBN 7-5399-0986-2
- 中国当代作家. 铁凝系列 "Collected Works of Tie Ning" (9 volumes), People's Literature Publishing House, (2006)
  - 玫瑰门 "The Rose Door", novel, ISBN 7-02-005753-5
  - 大浴女 "The Bathing Women", novel, ISBN 7-02-005746-2
  - 无雨之城 "Rainless City", novel, ISBN 7-02-005754-3
  - 永远有多远 "How Long is Forever", novella collection, ISBN 7-02-005749-7
  - 午后悬崖 "Afternoon Cliffs", novella collection, ISBN 7-02-005748-9
  - 有客来兮 "The Guests Have Arrived!", short story collection, ISBN 7-02-005752-7
  - 巧克力手印 "The Chocolate Handprint", short story collection, ISBN 7-02-005747-0
  - 会走路的梦 "Walking Dreams", essay collection, ISBN 7-02-005751-9
  - 像剪纸一样美艳明净 "As Clean and Lovely as Paper-Cut", essay collection, ISBN 7-02-005750-0
- 笨花 "Clumsy Flower", novel, People's Literature Publishing House, (2006), ISBN 7-02-005342-4
- 第12夜 "The Twelfth Night", short story and novella collection, Hong Kong Ming Pao Press, (2007), ISBN 978-962-8958-32-0
- 从梦想出发 : 铁凝散文随笔集 "Starting with Dreams – The Essays of Tie Ning", essay collection, Hunan Literature and Art Publishing House, (2007), ISBN 978-7-5404-3968-2
- 惊异是美丽的 "The Beauty of Amazement", essay collection, Writers Publishing House, (2009), ISBN 978-7-5063-4488-3
- 回到欢乐 "A Return to Joy", essay collection, Henan Literature and Art Publishing House, (2009), ISBN 978-7-80765-013-3
- 巧克力手印 "The Chocolate Handprint", Hong Kong Ming Pao Press, (2009), ISBN 978-988-18046-6-2
- 铁凝散文 : 插图珍藏版 "The Essays of Tie Ning" (illustrated edition), essay collection, People's Literature Publishing House, (2009), ISBN 978-7-02-007474-7
- 桥的翅膀 "The Winged Bridge – Essays on Culture", essay collection, The Commercial Press, (2010), ISBN 978-7-80103-684-1
- "How Long is Forever" (English version), short story and novella collection, Shanghai Press and Publishing Development Company/Reader's Digest Association, (2010), ISBN 978-1-60652-152-6
- 蝴蝶发笑 "The Butterfly Smiles – Student Readings Selected by the Masters", short story and essay collection, Liaoning People's Publishing House, (2012), ISBN 978-7-205-07353-4
- "The Bathing Women (English version)", Simon & Schuster, US, (2012), ISBN 978-1-4516-9484-0
- "The Bathing Women (English version)", Harper Collins, UK, (2012), ISBN 978-0-00-748985-5
- 农民舞会 "Peasants' Ball", essay collection, Thread-Binding Books Publishing House, (2012), ISBN 978-7-5120-0809-0
- 伊琳娜的禮帽 "Irina’s Hat", selected stories, New Land, Taiwan, (2013), ISBN 978-986-5877-08-8
- Sonsuz ne kadar uzun "How Long is Forever" (Turkish version), novella, Turkey, (2013), ISBN 978-605-4511-93-8
- ตลอดกาลน่ะนานแค่ไหน "How Long is Forever" (Thai version, translated by Princess Maha Chakri Sirindhorn), novella, Nanmee Books, (2014), ISBN 978-616-04-1831-2

Cultural offices
Preceded by Ba Jin	Chairlady of China Writers Association; 2006–2025	Succeeded by Zhang Hongsen
Political offices
Preceded by Sun Jiazheng	Chairperson of the China Federation of Literary and Art Circles; 2016	Incumbent
