= Jiang Yun =

Chinese writer (born 1954)

Jiang Yun (Chinese: 蒋韵, born 1954) is a Chinese fiction writer. She is the winner of numerous prizes, including the prestigious Lu Xun Literary Prize, Lao She Literary Award and Yu Dafu Prize for Fiction.

In 2002, Jiang participated in the International Writing Program at the University of Iowa.

== Works translated in English ==
- "Beloved Tree" (trans. Charles Laughlin) in By the River: Seven Contemporary Chinese Novellas (University of Oklahoma Press, 2016) ISBN 978-0-806154046
- The Red Detachment of Women, trans. Annelise Finegan and Mingyuan Hu (Hermits United, 2023) ISBN 978-1-739389710
